= Trance to the Sun =

American band

- Origin: United States
- Genres: Ethereal wave, gothic rock, dream pop, post-punk, neo-psychedelia
- Years active: 1990–2002, 2013–present (reunion: 2007)
- Labels: Etherhaus, Tess Records, Ambulancia, Precipice Records, Projekt Records, Below Sea Level Recordings
- Members: Ashkelon Sain – guitar, bass guitar, programmed drums, synthesizers, vocals, effects, samples (1990–); Ingrid Luna/Blue – vocals (1997–); Daniel Henderson – drums (2013–)
- Past members: Zoë Alexandra Wakefield – vocals (1993–1996); Lucian S. Donato – synthesizer (1994–1997); Dawn Wagner – vocals (1997)
- Website: trancetothesun.bandcamp.com

Trance to the Sun (1990–present) is a neo-psychedelic post-punk band originally based out of Santa Barbara, California. The band consists of multi-instrumentalist Ashkelon Sain (born Gregory Lloyd Sain) as the primary songwriter, performer and producer, and has featured three full-time vocalists—Ingrid Blue (also known as Ingrid Luna - born Ingrid Justina Holden) (1997–present), Dawn Michelle Wagner (1997), and Zoë Alexandra Wakefield (1993–1996). Trance to the Sun recordings have often included guest contributors, and tour line-ups have usually included one or more additional musicians. Currently, the band consists of Ashkelon Sain, Ingrid Luna, and Daniel Henderson, with additional live musician Terry Luna on bass guitar.

Trance to the Sun has had a considerable impact on the dark wave, gothic rock and post-punk music scenes in the U.S. and abroad. Mike Ventarola of the internet radio station Hidden Sanctuary described Trance to the Sun as "one of a few select bands from that part of the world whose previous compilation appearances, CD’s and tour dates read like a who’s who for the goth underground. Despite the multiple band lineup changes over the years, the core group remained tenacious and steadfast. They are applauded and adored by fans worldwide because they haven’t sold out to the corporate mindset looking for the one hit wonder of the week. Instead, they created a legacy of music that is at once entertaining as it is intelligent."

Also noteworthy is the band's productivity. Between 1993 and 2002, Trance to the Sun released 7 studio albums, one E.P., and one live concert album, and toured the U.S. five times. As of April 2014, 25 Trance to the Sun songs have been featured on 23 artist compilations. Trance To The Sun halted the making of any new music in 2002. During the band's inactive period, the band released three compilations including previously released and unreleased material, and two remastered albums. The Ingrid Blue version of the band reunited for a one-show reunion performance in 2007.

In 2013, Trance to the Sun reformed to tour and release their 8th studio album titled Via Subterranea, which was eventually released in 2016. In January 2014, the band performed live for the first time in 7 years, and for the first time in support of a (forthcoming) studio album in 13 years.

== Early years (1990–1993) ==
The origin of the name Trance to the Sun was explained by Sain in 1995. "Our music is for the nocturnal environment, delivered in a trance-like state, made possible by the wealth of energy dealt to earth in the daytime by the sun."

Trance to the Sun began in 1990 as Ashkelon Sain performing solo electric guitar in Southern California. He received a favorable response to his first cassette release Volcano (1990) on his personal label Etherhaus, which was followed up by a second cassette release Dusk in 1991 on Etherhaus. Between 1990 and 1992 Sain also performed intermittently with the band This Ascension, and in 1991 started the band Blade Fetish with Matt Ballesteros of This Ascension and Mark Linder.

Sain recalled Trance to the Sun's beginnings in a 1995 interview with Morbid Outlook magazine. "The spirit of Trance to the Sun began in 1990 when I forewent [sic] convention and released a cassette called Trance to the Sun "Volcano" which consisted of nothing more than eight works played on electric guitar with a plethora of ambient, spacious effects. Another cassette entitled "Dusk" followed in 1991—one song-forty minutes. The last three tracks on our "Ghost Forest" CD are the culmination of that period, from one of about ten live performances I did around Santa Barbara and LA. There were some "off" periods in 1992 and 1993, where I was involved in Blade Fetish and This Ascension."

== The Wakefield Period (1993–1996) ==
=== Ghost Forest ===
Blade Fetish broke up in 1992, reformed in 1993 and toured the U.S., and then parted ways again. During the break, Sain began recording new songs on his 4-track with his then-girlfriend Wakefield, and recording his live performances. Sain recalled the time in a 1995 interview. "Stepping down from the rehearsal and performance rigors of [Blade Fetish and This Ascension], I went back to work in my studio. Then I heard Zoë sing...."

Tess Records signed Trance to the Sun in 1993 and the band released Ghost Forest, a collection of Sain's live and studio recordings, on cassette later that year. Additional musicians included Wakefield on vocals in “Cauldron Street” and "August Rain V.1", and guest contributions by Dave Stein on keyboards, and guitar by Kevin Serra of This Ascension on the track "August Rain V.1".

The European branch of Tess Records requested a CD version of the Ghost Forest. With the intent to raise the fidelity of the recording, a partially re-recorded version of the album was submitted for release on CD in 1994. Sain would eventually remaster the original cassette version for re-release on Below Sea Level Recordings in 2012. Glenn Petteys, who had also toured with Faith & the Muse and Blade Fetish, performed live with the band in 1994 in support of the album.

=== "Bloom Flowers, Bloom!" ===
In early 1995, Trance to the Sun released "Bloom Flowers, Bloom!" with Sain recording or programming instruments and with Wakefield in a more established vocalist/lyricist role. Alternative Press noted that the album "incorporates elements of experimental, goth, ambient, and rock into an ethereal stew, emphasizing cyclical trance structures around which the various elements interweave. Zoë's vocals are often indiscernible, which can be a bit frustrating, but it's the aural quality of her voice that is more important, acting as another instrument and not just a vessel for lyrics, which here are dream-like in their flow and not bereft of meaning."

To support "Bloom Flowers, Bloom!", Sain and Wakefield toured the U.S. with the band Lycia with additional musician Israel Medina performing bass guitar. During one of these shows, Lycia vocalist Mike Van Portfleet lost his voice, and Sain filled in for vocal duties.

The band was very close with Lycia and enjoyed their time on tour together. Sain: "We set up a show for [ Lycia ] to play with us in Santa Barbara. They invited us to play a show with them in Phoenix. Mike is so swell and helpful. I knew I wanted to tour with them and so did he. By the time our west coast shows rolled around, our respective record companies were booking us a joint national tour....

"Mike lost his voice toward the end so I did my best to sing for them in Atlanta. I felt I had done terribly but afterward, all these people came up to me saying, 'I've loved you since Ionia.' I also wrote a bassline for their song Nine Hours Later, which they invited me onstage to play at several shows."

Also during this tour, Trance to the Sun played C1, the first annual floating Convergence festival, in Chicago, Illinois. The band also began appearing on artist compilation albums at this time.

Despite frequently being considered as part of the gothic rock genre, Sain did not view the music as such, though he did credit its listeners with discovering many noteworthy bands: "Goth is an important doorway for lots of things that would not be accepted easily anywhere else. For example, who were the first people to embrace the Sugarcubes? Goths. And now we have a megastar of Björk. Pixies 1988? Gothic audience, not fratboys. Einsturzende Neubaten walked in through the "gothic" door—Miranda Sex Garden—Cocteau Twins. It's no wonder nobody can agree on what "Gothic" means... depth and dissonance and polite confrontationalism are quite possibly the only denominators.... I just like to play interesting music. It just so happens to be the 'goths' who are listening."

"I like good goth music a lot and I do see a certain connection in our music to goth but I've never had any inspiration to be like somebody else or to go in a certain style. I have my own ideas and if they ever too closely resemble something that I've heard before, I usually discard them."

In 2020, Sain remastered the album for re-release on Below Sea Level Recordings, including four additional tracks from the era—Live versions of "A Moon Short Stay Cure", "You So You" from Zoë Wakefield's first live performance, "Clown Small & Even", and "Crystalize & Slant" which first appeared on a German compilation.

=== Venomous Eve ===
Venomous Eve, which was already being recorded prior to the release of "Bloom Flowers, Bloom!", was released in late 1995. The album relied heavily on the Morpheus synthesizer manufactured by E-MU Systems, and credited its performance to Lucian S. Donato as a third member of the group.

Sain commented on the experience of gaining a third member in a 1995 interview. "I do work the shit out of my electronic equipment but there's got to be live instruments and a lot of depth as well.... It's been a long, evolutionary process, but I think it's safe to say that we are now a threesome. We've taken on a keyboardist named Lucian, who is really quite a bizarre character. He fits in as though he was always there, it's strange."

Venomous Eve was the best-received Trance to the Sun album to date. Dave Segal of Alternative Press wrote: "Trance cast off the crutches of conventional song structure and bask in a shimmering miasma of tweaked and freaked guitars, synths, violins and bass... These nine long songs move with knight-like stealth and elegance, wreathed in all manner of bizarre noises..." Albany, NY's Music Advocate wrote that "Venomous Eve is fog-shadowed walks through perfumed night gardens, and languorous waltzes in cold-orb lit tower ballrooms set to brooding gothic-shrouded atmospheres." Venomous Eve took off on American college radio, achieving the rank of No. 1 most played album on San Francisco area radio station KFJC in March 1996.

On August 29, 1996, Wakefield left the band on the day before the band was to open for Love Spirals Downwards in San Francisco, California. Trance to the Sun had been opening for Cindytalk earlier in the year, and Sain asked Gordon Sharp (Cindytalk, This Mortal Coil), who was visiting Sain at the time, to sing in her place. Robert Alonzo, who had just joined the live line-up on drums for the first time in the band's history, played only one earlier show with the group prior to Wakefield's departure.

In 2021, Sain remastered the album with an expanded 16 page booklet featuring photos and history from Trance to the Sun's inception through the Venomous Eve era for re-release on Below Sea Level Recordings.

== The Wagner Period (1997) ==
=== Delirious ===
Sain enlisted Dragonqueen vocalist Dawn Wagner, who had opened for Trance to the Sun during the Cindytalk tour, as a replacement for Wakefield in 1997. The two released the E.P. Delirious later that year, where Sain also performed some vocal duties. Gary Thrasher of Outburn Magazine wrote:

"Always at the forefront of experimental goth music, Trance to the Sun don't appear to have even slipped a notch after the departure of vocalist Zoe Wakefield.... With a voice that can swoop from the cloudy heights of Cocteau Twins' Liz Frasier down to the sexually charged growl of Switchblade Symphony's Tina Root, Dawn brings a whole new feel to the band. Ashkelon steps up to show he has an excellent voice as well on "Sympathy For Cruel Causes.""

A U.S. tour in support of the release followed with bassist Israel Medina, from which Medina was eventually removed and replaced with Ashe Ruppe and Mark Blewett was brought in on drums. After the tour, Wagner left the group to focus on her new project Scarlet Slipping, for which Sain recorded and mixed two albums. An outtake from this period, "Winter Furnace Winds", appears on Spiders, Aether & Rain.

== The Blue Period (1997–2002) ==
=== Azalean Sea 1998 1997 1996 ===
Sain recruited Ingrid Luna (then Ingrid Blue), who had performed violin on some 1996 demos, as the third vocalist in 1997. In 1998 Trance to the Sun released Azalean Sea 1998 1997 1996. It is the only Trance to the Sun album to feature all three vocalists—the first released recordings with Blue, as well as unreleased tracks from the Wagner and Wakefield periods—and contains many of the band's most popular songs including "Execution of the Stars", "Slave", and "August Rain V.3". The album featured several guest musicians including Faith and Disease members Eric Cooley and Dara Rosenwasser, and also featured album artwork by Wakefield and Blue. Cover artwork and direction by Blue, an accomplished painter in her own right, would become commonplace beginning in 1999.

From a May 1999 review by Thomas Roche of the San Francisco-based Gothic.net: "Most striking upon listening to this album is the amount of energy that throbs through the music--the rhythm tracks are always active and the bright bass churns smoothly, keeping each song driving along with the intense sensation of movement no matter how moody and spooky the vocals and guitar can get. You're forced to throw away any preconceptions that Goth is 'low-energy' music."

The band toured the U.S to support the album with additional musician Joaquin Gray on bass guitar as joint headliners with Seattle's Faith and Disease, joining together for the end of the set.

=== Urchin Tear Soda/Florakleptonomy ===
Sain and Blue released the full-length album Urchin Tear Soda in 1999, and then toured the U.S to support it with additional musicians Dhanan Zakheim on bass guitar and guitarist James Webb (recruited from Santa Barbara thrash metal band Asinine, for whom Sain had produced a demo recording earlier that year). The album included a cover of "Set the Controls for the Heart of the Sun" by Pink Floyd. This marks the first time that Trance to the Sun included a cover song on one of their albums, though they have recorded several for various compilations over the years.

Urchin Tear Soda was more synthetic and refined than previous releases. Paul Angelosanto of Instant Magazine wrote, "The production and implementation are impeccable. Every tone and echo seem to be perfectly placed and designed. It all feels so well made that when listened to it gives you the feeling of sitting alone as space rushes through you."

A live recording of the 1999 Urchin Tear Soda tour from Santa Barbara, which features four songs from Urchin Tear Soda and the songs "Automatic Reversal" from Azalean Sea, "You Can Never Cut Your Hair" from the 4-CD Cleopatra Records compilation The Black Bible, and "Malla At Ease" from the Cleopatra Witchcraft Compilation, was released as the limited CD-R release Florakleptonomy (1999). This recording was remastered in 2011 and a digital booklet was added which contained footage from a stop in Seattle about a week later in the tour.

In 2000, Trance to the Sun undertook a second tour in support of Urchin Tear Soda with Joaquin Gray returning to bass duties. This tour included a second Convergence appearance at C6 in Seattle, Washington.

=== Atrocious Virgin ===
In 2001, Trance to the Sun released Atrocious Virgin. The cover art features several paintings and drawings by Blue. This album contains the track "Homewrecker", generally regarded as Trance to the Sun's most popular song.

Sain considered Atrocious Virgin to be among his best work, referring to it on the Trance to the Sun Bandcamp website as their "gothic-psychedelia magnum opus". In 2002, he commented on the experience: "In the studio, it would take me typically 3 weeks to finish a Trance To The Sun song; and in that 3 week period I would spend anywhere from 80 to 180 hours. I kind of logged my studio time. To do that kind of studio work by yourself, you have to take careful notes. And on the last Trance To The Sun album there's a song called "Map of the Lost" which set the all time record at 180 hours. "Map of The Lost" is one of the greatest pieces I've ever come up with. The reason it took so long is because it went through several mutilations before reaching a final stage."

The band toured the U.S. to support the album, with Joaquin Gray once again on bass guitar. A Trance to the Sun cover of the Cocteau Twins song "When Mama Was Moth" appeared on the 2002 Dewdrops Records compilation Half Gifts: A Tribute To The Cocteau Twins, and also appeared on Spiders, Aether & Rain.

=== Dissolution ===
In 2001, Sain and Blue decided to discontinue the group. Sain elaborated in a 2002 interview:

"It became time to do something else. We did 7 albums and 131 shows... almost 200 songs recorded in our studio, and life just really became to a natural, if not dramatic, conclusion for me in Santa Barbara, I had a pretty traumatic accident, where I was hospitalized; I was jilted romantically in a pretty bad way and I didn't react to that very well, and I kinda' went crazy for awhile. I went off my head, and I went to work at sea. I took a job on a ship for awhile....

"I need to be a part of a bigger organization of people. And maybe the impeding factor in being so largely responsible, is there is only so much one person can do. And wanting to be able to do more, wanting to accomplish more... ultimately it leads to frustration. Like, I don't ask for more in terms of what that music was. The music came out precisely as it should of [sic], I spent ALL the time necessary that it did. The tours certainly suffered. We played under-promoted tours, and there were some nights when only 10 people showed up... and it does become hard to justify driving 1000 miles to play one show where 10 people have shown up. I mean, we played those shows, we played them masterfully, we put everything we had into them... but you can only do that for so long. You can only have that happen so many times..."

Sain spent the summer of 2001 recording and producing the album The Astonished Eyes Of Evening for the Los Angeles band Cinema Strange, which was released on German label Trisol. In fall 2001, he began a series of ambient recordings, self releasing them under the name Submarine Fleet.

=== Relocation ===
Sain relocated to Portland, Oregon in March 2002. Ashe Ruppe, who lived in Portland, helped facilitate the move. In Portland, Sain continued doing both performance and production work. He briefly joined the local Cure tribute band theXplodingboys in 2003, which he would rejoin in 2009. Sain participated in the band Electromagnet, with Ashe Ruppe and also Marshal Serna of Sumerland, releasing one E.P.. Then Sain began a full band, also named Submarine Fleet, that included Mark Linder and Ashe Ruppe, as well as Dhanan Zakheim on bass guitar and Daniel Canty on drums. Submarine Fleet released two albums in 2005 and 2007.

Sain produced the Projekt Records releases Atlan (2009) and Eztica (2011) of the Portland-based Tuvan throat singer Soriah, for which Sain also performed, received co-billing, and toured. The 2011 and 2012 west coast Soriah tours were expanded to include a full band that included theXplodingboys drummer Daniel Henderson, who would join Trance to the Sun in 2013.

== 2007 Reunion/Spiders, Aether & Rain ==
In 2007, Trance to the Sun reunited for a single performance at C13 (Convergence) in Portland, Oregon with Ingrid Blue on lead vocals, Dhanan Zakheim on bass guitar, and several of Sain's Portland collaborators performing additional backing vocals, guitars, electronics, and hand percussion. A commemorative video of the performance was created by Sean Strauss, featuring Noah Mickens as master of ceremonies. A best-of studio collection personally assembled by Sain, Spiders, Aether & Rain...The Finest Works Of Trance to the Sun, was concurrently released on Projekt Records in 2007. Along with songs from each full-length studio release to date, the collection also featured the unreleased outtake "Winter Furnace Winds" from the Dawn Wagner period, and the Cocteau Twins cover "When Mama Was Moth".

== The Blue Obscurities/All the Covers ==
In 2011, Trance to the Sun released The Blue Obscurities, a collection of previous compilation tracks and unreleased material from the 1999-2001 Blue period, as well as two newer instrumental pieces, on Below Sea Level Recordings. The cover art once again consisted of artwork by Blue, and included photos from an unfinished video for the Atrocious Virgin track "Sleeping With the Natives".

Trance to the Sun also released a digital-only album All the Covers (1995 - 2001) through Projekt Records in 2011, which consisted of a collection of previously exclusive compilation tracks that the band had reacquired the rights to release. An extended version of "Set the Controls for the Heart of the Sun" appears on this release. The remastered version of Florakleptonomy was also released in digital-only format in 2011. The remastered version of the original 1993 cassette version of Ghost Forest was re-released on CD on Below Sea Level Recordings in 2012.

== Ascension to the Sun ==
In 2012, as part of a Tess Records tribute at Portland's Brickbat Mansion, a live performance collective called Ascension to the Sun was formed. It consisted of Sain, Dru Allen and Cynthia Coulter of This Ascension, Jeremy George of Faith & the Muse, and Henderson. The line-up performed three shows consisting of Trance to the Sun and This Ascension material. Videos of "Rex" from "Bloom Flowers, Bloom!" and the This Ascension songs "Fearful Symmetry" and "Chameleon Room" were captured from the initial Portland performance.

== Reformation ==
=== Via Subterranea ===
In 2013, Sain and Blue decided to reform once again as Trance to the Sun, this time to write a new album. The reformed line-up included Sain, Blue, and the addition of Daniel Henderson as drummer. Blue remained in Santa Barbara, making it a cross-state effort. A Kickstarter campaign for the album, tentatively called Aviatrix, commenced in September 2013, and the project met its goal in a few days.

In a September 29, 2013 Kickstarter Backer's Interview video, Sain and Blue cited many reasons for bringing back Trance to the Sun. Sain noted that "the whole culture of music has changed where it seems somehow right, now, to do a Trance to the Sun album where it might not have seemed right even five years ago.... [in the digital age] music is comprehensively changed in how people view it.... Now every genre co-exists. Trance to the Sun needs to make another album in that climate."

Aviatrix was the first Trance to the Sun studio album to contain acoustic drums. In November 2013 in Portland, Oregon, Sain and Henderson performed instrumental versions of four new songs as Trance to One Half of the Sun a few days prior to recording their guitar and drum parts. Reflecting what their rehearsals were like for the album recording, the show featured a backing track with bass and keyboards but no vocals, which "showcase[d] the way our new songs sound live in their present, half realized state." Island 13, a 5-song E.P. of re-recorded back catalog songs, was released on Bandcamp.com in December 2013 on Below Sea Level Recordings.

On January 11, 2014, Trance to the Sun performed as a full band for the first time since 2007, and for the first time in support of a (forth-coming) album in 13 years, at El Corazon in Seattle, Washington, followed by a Portland, Oregon performance the next evening. The live line-up featured Sain on electric guitars, Blue on vocals, Henderson on drums, and Blue's husband Terry Luna on bass guitar, along with a minimal backing track. Shortly afterward, the band released a live video of "Execution of the Stars" from Azalean Sea 1998 1997 1996 / Spiders, Aether and Rain. Additional California tour dates were announced in February 2014 and were performed in late April/early May.

On April 20, 2014, an early version of Railcar to Tasmania from the upcoming album appeared on the At Sea Compilations album "Twist The Past 1".

In an April 24, 2014 Kickstarter update, Trance to the Sun announced that, due to a conflict with another band "near to the scene" that had recently released an album with a similar name, the name of the upcoming album had been changed from Aviatrix to Via Subterranea. However, the band agreed that the new name fit the material better.

The album's release date was originally scheduled for Spring 2014, ahead of the California performance dates. But its release was delayed due to frustrations with the album's sound as of the original release deadline. In a July 30, 2014 Kickstarter update, Sain credited the unanticipated complications of mixing such a complex album for the delay, and renewed his intention to release the best possible version of the album. Sain stated that he was ending involvement in all other musical endeavors until the album was complete, save for an already agreed-upon engagement playing bass guitar for the late summer 2014 Spiritual Bat tour.

Trance to the Sun did schedule additional performances in 2015. Enrique Ugalde (Soriah) served as bass guitarist for two February Pacific Northwest shows. Additional California show dates were performed in late May/early June with Terry Luna resuming bass duties. A live video from the Portland performance of the Urchin Tear Soda song "Black Sea, Black Fish" featuring footage from both legs of the tour was released at the end of 2015.

On November 26, 2016, the Trance to the Sun Facebook page announced that the album Via Subterranea, having undergone extensive mixing to achieve the highest possible sonic quality, was virtually complete, and that pre-orders were available on the Trance to the Sun Bandcamp page with a release date of December 30, 2016.

On December 3, 2016 a free promotional single for Max Mystic was released on Bandcamp A video for Max Mystic was released a few days later on YouTube.

The album was released on Below Sea Level Recordings. opus.fm wrote: "On Via Subterranea, their first full-length since 2001’s Atrocious Virgin, Portland’s Trance to the Sun conjures up a heady blend of goth, shoegaze, and psychedelia that brings to mind even such a landmark album as The Cure’s Disintegration. Like Robert Smith’s magnum opus, there’s a commitment on the part of Trance to the Sun to go big or go home. Ingrid Luna Blue’s voice is coy, ethereal, and sultry, delivering abstract lyrics like “I could disrupt the orbit of your distant molten eye” and even garden gnome-inspired streams-of-consciousness. Meanwhile, Ashkelon Sain’s guitar evokes middle-eastern textures, tears through soaring solos, and delivers haunting ambience — sometimes all in the same song. (To continue with the Disintegration comparison, think “Prayers for Rain” or “Homesick” rather than, say, “Lovesong.”)"

A single and YouTube video for Railcar to Tasmania was released in February 2017.

== Discography ==
=== Albums and EPs ===
Album	Label	Year
Volcano (Cassette)	Etherhaus	1990
Dusk (Cassette)	Etherhaus	1991
Ghost Forest (Cassette)	Tess Records	1993
Ghost Forest (CD)	Tess Europe / Tess Records	1994
"Bloom Flowers, Bloom!" (CD)	Tess Records / Tess Europe	1995
Venomous Eve (CD)	Ambulancia	1995
Delirious (CD, EP)	Ambulancia	1997
Azalean Sea 1998 1997 1996 (CD)	Ambulancia	1998
Urchin Tear Soda (CD)	Precipice Records	1999
Florakleptonomy (CD-R, Album, limited edition)	Ambulancia	1999
Atrocious Virgin (CD)	Precipice Records	2001
Spiders, Aether & Rain...The Finest Works Of Trance to the Sun (CD, Comp)	Projekt Records	2007
The Blue Obscurities (CD, Comp)	Below Sea Level Recordings	2011
All The Covers (1995 - 2001) (digital-only, Comp)	Projekt Records	2011
Florakleptonomy (remaster) (digital-only, EP)	Projekt Records	2011
Ghost Forest (remaster of 1993 cassette release) (CD)	Below Sea Level Recordings	2012
Island 13 (digital-only)	Below Sea Level Recordings	2013
Lost Garden Gnome Hotline (CD single, limited edition)	Below Sea Level Recordings	2014
Via Subterranea (CD)	Below Sea Level Recordings	2016
"Bloom Flowers, Bloom!" (remaster) (CD)	Below Sea Level Recordings	2020
Venomous Eve (remaster) (CD)	Below Sea Level Recordings	2021

=== Compilation appearances ===
Album	Label	Year	Track #	Title
When The Sun Settles Down II (CD)	EFA / Foundation	1995	11	"Crystalize & Slant"
SubNation Volume One - Industry Vs. Artistry (CD)	SubNation Productions	1995	11	"Sliced Domiziana"
Ceremonial - A Tribute To Joy Division (CD)	Mere Mortal Productions	1995	2, 7	"Isolation", "Love Will Tear Us Apart" (Joy Division covers)
Alleviation (Various Artists) (CD)	Silber Records	1996	5	"Envisage"
Hex Files - The Goth Bible Vol. 2 - Compiled By Mick Mercer	Credo/Nova Tekk (2 CDs)	1997	CD 1, Tr. 10	"Velvet F**k"
Aria - A Tess Records Anthology (CD)	Tess Records	1997	9, 13	"Translucia (Edit)", "Clown Small & Even"
Subnation Volume 2 - An American Darkwave (CD)	SubNation Productions	1997	14	"Narcomedusa (Section 2)"
Precipice Recordings Volume One (CD)	Precipice Records	1997	4	"Memory Influx"
The Black Bible (4 CDs)	Cleopatra Records	1998	CD 3, Tr. 15	"You Can Never Cut Your Hair"
New Wave Goes To Hell - A Gothic-Industrial Tribute To Music Of The 80s (CD)	Cleopatra Records	1998	1	"Fade To Grey" (Visage cover)
Witchcraft - A Gothic Compilation (CD)	Cleopatra Records	1999	8	"Malla At Ease"
The Unquiet Grave - Music From the Gothic, Darkwave and Ethereal Underground - Volume One (CD)	Cleopatra Records	1999	CD 1, Tr. 2	"Slave"
Goth Oddity - A Tribute To David Bowie (CD)	Cleopatra Records	1999	7	"China Girl" (David Bowie cover)
A Tragick Compilation (CD)	Tragick Records	2000	4	"Modus Opera"
Dark Treasures - A Gothic Tribute To The Cocteau Twins (CD)	Cleopatra Records	2000	5	"The Thinner the Air" (Cocteau Twins cover)
Zann (Various Artists) (CD)	Silber Records	2000	3	"Phases Of The Razor (Part 1)"
Who Cares - A Tribute To The Who (CD)	Irregular	2000	12	"The Real Me" (The Who cover)
Hold The Vocals - A Tribute To Instrumental Hits Of The 50s 60s & 70s (CD)	Go-Kustom Records	2001	13	"Albatross" (Fleetwood Mac cover)
Songs of Terror - A Gothic Tribute To Edgar Allan Poe (CD)	Cleopatra Records	2001	8	"Virginia's Lament (Music)"
Half Gifts: A Tribute To The Cocteau Twins (CD)	Dewdrops Records	2002	1	"When Mama Was Moth" (Cocteau Twins cover)
San Francisco Goth Synth Industrial (CD)	Denki Tiger	2002	2	"Black Sea, Black Fish (Ocean Edit)"
Projekt 2007.2 Label Sampler (CD)	Projekt Records	2007	4	"Homewrecker"
Twist The Past 1 (CD)	At Sea Compilations	2014	14	"Railcar to Tasmania"

== Lineup ==
=== Current members ===
Personnel	Role
Ashkelon Sain	guitar, bass guitar, programmed drums, synthesizers, vocals, effects, samples (1990 - )
Ingrid Luna/Blue	vocals (1997 - )
Daniel Henderson	drums (2013 - )

=== Former members ===
Personnel	Role
Zoë Alexandra Wakefield	vocals (1993 - 1996)
Lucian S. Donato	synthesizer (1994 - 1997)
Dawn Wagner	vocals (1997)

=== Guest contributors ===
Personnel	Role
Kevin Serra	guitar (1993)
Dave Stein	keyboards (1993)
Mark Linder	guitar, voice (1994, 1998, 2001)
Anna Schott	violin (1995)
Dara Rosenwasser	vocals (1997)
Eric Cooley	bass guitar (1997)
Joaquin Gray	bass guitar (1999)
Laura Hackstein	violin (1999)
Jon Hunt	spoken word (2001)
Mike Borton	didgeridoo (2001)
Crow Mayhem	keyboards (2001)
Ashe Ruppe	additional swirling ambience (2014)
Paul Mercer	violin (2014)
Terry Luna	bass guitar (2014)

=== Guest live musicians ===
Personnel	Role
Glenn Petteys	bass guitar (1994)
Israel Medina	bass guitar (1995 - 1997)
Robert Alonzo	drums (1996)
Ashe Ruppe	bass guitar (1997)
Mark Blewett	drums (1997)
Lucian S. Donato	synthesizer (1998)
Dara Rosenwasser	vocals (1998)
Eric Cooley	bass guitar (1998)
Joaquin Grey	guitar (1998, 2000)
James Webb	guitar (1999)
Dhanan Zakheim	bass guitar (1999, 2007)
Uta Plotkin	backing vocals (2007)
Mark Linder	backing vocals (2007)
Nolon Ashley	sequencing, electronics (2007)
Jonathan Howitt	drums, percussion (2007)
Soriah	backing vocals (2007, 2015), bass guitar (2015)
Terry Luna	bass guitar (2014 - )
