= Tripping Back Into the Broken Days =

Tripping Back into the Broken Days

Studio album by Lycia
- Released: July 9, 2002
- Recorded: Summer, 2001
- Studio: Lycium Music, Mesa, AZ
- Genre: Dark wave, ethereal wave
- Length: 64:25
- Label: Projekt
- Producer: Lycia

Lycia chronology
Compilation Appearances Vol. 2 (2001)	Tripping Back into the Broken Days (2002)	Empty Space (2003)

Professional ratings
Review scores
Source	Rating
AllMusic	4/5 stars

Tripping Back into the Broken Days is the seventh studio album by Lycia. It was released on 9 July 2002 by Projekt Records.

== Track listing ==
All tracks are written by Tara VanFlower and Mike VanPortfleet.

No.	Title	Length
1.	"Broken Days"	5:02
2.	"It's Okay to Be Small"	5:49
3.	"The Last Winter"	5:40
4.	"Asleep in the River"	5:40
5.	"Fades Down Far"	5:45
6.	"Give Up the Ghost"	4:18
7.	"Vacant Winter Day"	6:54
8.	"Gray December Desert Day"	7:12
9.	"Blue Heron"	2:11
10.	"Halfway Between Here and There"	5:49
11.	"Cat and Dog"	4:30
12.	"Pale Blue Prevails"	5:35

== Personnel ==
Adapted from the Tripping Back into the Broken Days liner notes.

Lycia

- Mike VanPortfleet – vocals, synthesizer, guitar, drum machine, photography, design
- Tara VanFlower – vocals

Production and additional personnel

- Roger King – mastering
- Steve Roach – mastering
- Sam Rosenthal – design

== Release history ==
Region	Date	Label	Format	Catalog
United States	2002	Projekt	CD	PRO134
