= The First Pain to Linger =

EP by Black Tape for a Blue Girl
- Released: 1996
- Genre: Dark ambient; ethereal wave; neoclassical darkwave
- Length: 33:30
- Label: Projekt Records

Black Tape for a Blue Girl chronology
This Lush Garden Within (1993)	The First Pain to Linger (1996)	across a thousand blades- a retrospective (1996)

Professional ratings
Review scores
Source	Rating
AllMusic	4/5 stars

The First Pain to Linger is a book with a maxi-CD by the darkwave band Black Tape for a Blue Girl. It was released in 1996 by Projekt Records. It is also the title of a novella by Sam Rosenthal that accompanies the album. The songs are different mixes and compilation tracks recorded between 1990 and 1995, in conjunction with the This Lush Garden Within and A Chaos of Desire albums.

== Track listing ==
1. "Forbidden"
2. "The Glass Is Shattered"
3. "Pandora's Dream"
4. "Overwhelmed, Beneath Me"
5. "I No Longer Remember the Feelings"
6. "A Good Omen"
7. [Untitled]
