= Estrella (album) =

Studio album by Lycia
- Released: 1998
- Recorded: November 1997–January 1998
- Studio: Lycium Music, Streetsboro, OH
- Genre: Darkwave, ethereal wave
- Length: 57:10
- Label: Projekt
- Producer: Lycia

Lycia chronology
Cold (1996)	Estrella (1998)	Compilation Appearances Vol. 1 (2001)

Professional ratings
Review scores
Source	Rating
AllMusic	4/5 stars

Estrella is the sixth studio album by Lycia, released in 1998 by Projekt Records.

== Track listing ==
All lyrics are written by Tara VanFlower, except "Tainted", "Dome" and "The Kite" by Mike VanPortfleet; all music is composed by Mike VanPortfleet.

No.	Title	Length
1.	"Clouds in the Southern Sky"	3:41
2.	"El Diablo"	4:29
3.	"Tainted"	5:41
4.	"Tongues"	3:25
5.	"Estrella"	6:17
6.	"Dome"	2:32
7.	"Silver Sliver"	5:46
8.	"The Canal"	6:12
9.	"The Kite"	5:35
10.	"Orion"	6:36
11.	"Distant Fading Star"	6:56

== Personnel ==
Adapted from the Estrella liner notes.

Lycia

- Mike VanPortfleet – vocals, synthesizer, guitar, drum machine
- Tara VanFlower – vocals

Production and additional personnel

- Jason Rau – mastering
- Sam Rosenthal – mastering, design
- Tondalaya – photography

== Release history ==
Region	Date	Label	Format	Catalog
United States	1998	Projekt	CD	PRO81
United States	2006	Silber	CD	silber 040
