= Audra (band) =

Arizona-based rock band

- Origin: Mesa, Arizona, United States
- Genres: Gothic rock; post-punk
- Years active: 1991–present
- Label: Projekt
- Members: Bret Helm; Bart Helm; Jason DeWolfe Barton
- Website: www.audramusic.com

Audra is an Arizona-based rock band formed in 1991 in Mesa, Arizona by brothers Bret and Bart Helm. Audra broke out onto the national scene in 2000 when they signed with indie label Projekt Records. They have since released four full-length albums (two via Projekt), with the most recent released in 2019.

Audra has toured and performed alongside the likes of The Mission UK, Peter Murphy (of Bauhaus), AFI, Johnette Napolitano (of Concrete Blonde), Nitzer Ebb, She Wants Revenge, Gene Loves Jezebel, Lycia, Steve Roach, The Wonderstuff, Esben and the Witch, New Model Army and many others.

== History ==
Audra's first release, Unhappy Till the End, was issued on cassette in 1996 on their Audra Art Sex Religion label, followed by the self-released Silver Music CD EP in 1999.

In 2000, Audra signed with indie label Projekt Records, which released their first two studio albums, Audra (2000) and Going to the Theatre (2002).

On May 19, 2009, Audra released Everything Changes, their first album in seven years, on their own Audra Music label.

In 2017, the band reissued their first two albums as limited edition cassettes.

On July 16, 2018, Audra announced that they had begun recording their fourth album, and first since 2009. On October 15, the band launched a 30-day Indiegogo campaign to assist in funding the release. The album, titled Dear Tired Friends, was released on August 23, 2019, and includes a guest appearance from Mike VanPortfleet from Lycia on the track "Planet of Me".

== Other projects ==
Bret Helm is also known for his blog, "Life on This Planet", and its accompanying YouTube channel, "Bret Helm's Life on This Planet Blog". The name for his blog is taken from a song on Everything Changes. Bret is also an active member of Unto Ashes, appearing on their most recent album, 2019's Pretty Haunted Things. Bret was also a member of Black Tape for a Blue Girl from 2001 to 2007, contributing to 2002's The Scavenger Bride and 2004's Halo Star.

In April 2020, in response to the SARS-CoV-2 isolation, Bret Helm began hosting weekly live-streamed events on Facebook that included original material, stories behind Audra songs, and cover songs.

== Discography ==
=== Studio albums ===
- Audra (2000, Projekt Records)
- Going to the Theatre (2002, Projekt Records)
- Everything Changes (2009, Audra Music)
- Dear Tired Friends (2019, Audra Music)

=== Singles and EPs ===
- Unhappy Till the End cassette EP (1996, Audra Art Sex Religion)
- Silver Music CD EP (1999, self-released)
- "Midnight Moon Swing" promo CD single (2002, Projekt Records)
- "Let the Reindeer Live on My Roof" digital single (2010, Audra Music)
- Bonus Track EP digital EP (2018, Audra Music)
- "Wish No Harm" digital single (2019, Audra Music)
- "Sliding Under Cars" digital single (2019, Audra Music)

=== Compilation appearances ===
- Orphee (2000, Projekt Records)
- Within This Infinite Ocean (2001, Projekt Records)
- Excelsis 3: A Prelude (2001, Projekt Records)
- Excelsis Box Set (2001, Projekt Records)
- Kiss the Night (2002, Cleopatra Records)
- A Dark Noel (2002, Projekt Records)
- Projekt: Gothic (2002, Projekt Records)
- Romantic Sounds 4 (2002, Zillo Magazine)
- Unquiet Grave Vol. 4 (2003, Cleopatra Records)
- Dark Awakening Vol. 3 (2003, Cop International)
- The Tongue Achieves the Dialect: Tribute to Rozz Williams (2003, Dark Vinyl)
- The New Face of Goth (2003, Projekt Records)
- Love's Shattered Pride: Tribute to Joy Division - Walked in Line (2005, Failure to Communicate Records)
- A Dark Cabaret – Cabaret Fortune Teller (2005, Projekt Records)
- Projekt 200 (2007, Projekt Records)
