= Live (Lycia album) =

Live album by Lycia
- Released: 1994
- Recorded: October 3, 1993
- Studio: Auditorium, Hollywood, California
- Genre: Dark wave, ethereal wave
- Length: 67:28
- Label: Projekt
- Producer: Lycia

Lycia chronology
A Day in the Stark Corner (1993)	Live (1994)	Vane (1995)

Professional ratings
Review scores
Source	Rating
AllMusic	4/5 stars

Live is a live album by the electronic band Lycia. It was released in 1994 on Projekt Records.

== Track listing ==
All tracks are written by Lycia.

No.	Title	Length
1.	"Intro"	4:18
2.	"Brief Glimpse"	4:37
3.	"Nine Hours Later"	5:06
4.	"Fate"	6:09
5.	"The Facade Fades"	4:44
6.	"Pygmallion"	6:09
7.	"Last Thoughts Before Sleep (Sun Beats Hard)"	19:39
8.	"The Body Electric"	5:49
9.	"Daphne"	7:04
10.	"Everything is Cold"	3:53

== Personnel ==
Adapted from the Live liner notes.

- David Galas – synthesizer
- Sam Rosenthal – photography, design
- Mike VanPortfleet – vocals, synthesizer, guitar

== Release history ==
Region	Date	Label	Format	Catalog
United States	1994	Projekt	CD, CS	PRO49
