= Cold (Lycia album) =

Studio album by Lycia
- Released: 1996
- Recorded: January – February 1996
- Studios: Shelter, Streetsboro, OH
- Genres: Darkwave, ethereal wave, gothic rock
- Length: 57:48
- Label: Projekt
- Producer: Lycia

Lycia chronology
The Burning Circle and Then Dust (1995)	Cold (1996)	Estrella (1998)

Cold is the fifth studio album by the American dark wave band Lycia, released in 1996 by Projekt Records.

== Reception ==
Professional ratings
Review scores
Source	Rating
AllMusic	4/5 stars

Ned Raggett of AllMusic called Cold a "significant step forward in the trio's continuing sonic evolution" and noting the increased use of Tara VanFlower's vocals as well as electronics playing a larger role in the music

== Track listing ==
No.	Title	Writer(s)	Length
1.	"Frozen"	VanPortfleet	7:35
2.	"Bare"	VanPortfleet	5:28
3.	"Baltica"	VanFlower, VanPortfleet	6:39
4.	"Colder"	Galas, VanPortfleet	4:58
5.	"Snowdrop"	Vanflower, VanPortfleet	6:07
6.	"Drifting"	VanPortfleet	7:26
7.	"December"	Galas, VanPortfleet	5:05
8.	"Polaris"	Vanflower, VanPortfleet	7:25
9.	"Later"	VanPortfleet	7:14

== Personnel ==
Adapted from the Cold liner notes.

Lycia

- David Galas – bass guitar, keyboards, synthesizer, sampler, programming, engineering, mixing
- Tara VanFlower – vocals
- Mike VanPortfleet – vocals, guitar, synthesizer, programming, mastering

Production and additional personnel

- Kevin Gray – mastering
- Ryan Lum – mastering
- Lycia – production
- Sam Rosenthal – art direction, design

== Release History ==
Region	Date	Label	Format	Catalog
United States	1996	Projekt	CD	PRO55
United States	2007	Silber	CD	silber 048
United States	2013	Handmade Birds	LP	HB-DIS054
