= Compilation Appearances Vol. 1 =

Compilation album by Lycia
- Released: January 30, 2001
- Recorded: 1990–1994
- Genre: Dark wave, ethereal wave
- Length: 73:49
- Label: Projekt
- Producer: Lycia

Lycia chronology
Estrella (1998)	Compilation Appearances Vol. 1 (2001)	Compilation Appearances Vol. 2 (2001)

Professional ratings
Review scores
Source	Rating
AllMusic	4/5 stars

Compilation Appearances Vol. 1 is a compilation album by Lycia, released on January 30, 2001 by Projekt Records.

== Track listing ==
No.	Title	Length
1.	"From Foam"	4:13
2.	"Down"	5:30
3.	"Excade Decade Decada"	6:13
4.	"Byzantine"	5:56
5.	"The Deception"	5:14
6.	"Everything Is Cold"	3:20
7.	"Nine Hours Later"	5:03
8.	"Sleepless"	3:26
9.	"The Facade Fades"	4:25
10.	"Wake" (live)	4:48
11.	"Across a Thousand Blades"	4:11
12.	"This Lush Garden Within"	2:20
13.	"The Dust Sessions: Fields"	3:30
14.	"The Dust Sessions: Approach"	6:36
15.	"The Dust Sessions: Dusk"	4:58
16.	"The Dust Sessions: Dementia"	3:38
17.	"The Dust Sessions: Wind"	1:07

== Personnel ==
Adapted from the Compilation Appearances Vol. 1 liner notes.

- Dick Charles – mastering
- Sam Rosenthal – mastering, design
- Mike VanPortfleet – vocals, synthesizer, guitar, drum machine, photography, design

== Release history ==
Region	Date	Label	Format	Catalog
United States	2001	Projekt	CD	PRO108
