= Compilation Appearances Vol. 2 =

Compilation album by Lycia
- Released: July 31, 2001
- Recorded: 1995–1999
- Genre: Dark wave, ethereal wave
- Length: 75:08
- Label: Projekt
- Producer: Lycia

Lycia chronology
Compilation Appearances Vol. 1 (2001)	Compilation Appearances Vol. 2 (2001)	Tripping Back Into the Broken Days (2002)

Professional ratings
Review scores
Source	Rating
AllMusic	4/5 stars
Alternative Press	3.5/5 stars

Compilation Appearances Vol. 2 is a compilation album by Lycia, released on July 31, 2001, by Projekt Records.

== Track listing ==
No.	Title	Length
1.	"The Brilliant Nighttime"	3:48
2.	"We Three Kings"	3:46
3.	"In a Lonely Place"	6:41
4.	"Everything Is Cold"	3:28
5.	"Clouds in the Southern Sky (Sweeping in Like Waves)"	4:58
6.	"Caterpillar Butterfly"	6:07
7.	"The Morning Breaks So Cold and Gray" (live)	7:40
8.	"Grey Clouds" (live)	5:21
9.	"Dome"	6:27
10.	"Defective"	5:47
11.	"Transition"	3:52
12.	"The Devil"	6:14
13.	"The Time Passes Quickly"	7:13
14.	"O Little Town of Bethlehem"	3:46

== Personnel ==
Adapted from the Compilation Appearances Vol. 2 liner notes.

- Brian Jensen – mastering
- Sam Rosenthal – mastering, design
- Mike VanPortfleet – vocals, synthesizer, guitar, drum machine

== Release history ==
Region	Date	Label	Format	Catalog
United States	2001	Projekt	CD	PRO120
