= Remnants of a Deeper Purity =

Studio album by Black Tape for a Blue Girl
- Released: June 7, 1996
- Recorded: January 1995–April 1996
- Studio: The Lush Garden, Los Angeles, California and Chicago, Illinois
- Genre: Neoclassical dark wave; ethereal wave; dark ambient
- Length: 77:08
- Label: Projekt
- Producer: Sam Rosenthal

Black Tape for a Blue Girl chronology
This Lush Garden Within (1993)	Remnants of a Deeper Purity (1996)	As One Aflame Laid Bare by Desire (1999)

Remnants of a Deeper Purity is the sixth studio album by the darkwave band Black Tape for a Blue Girl. It was released on June 7, 1996, by Projekt Records. A cassette version was released in 1997 on Poland's Black Flames Productions. In 2007, a 10th-anniversary edition of the album was released, with a bonus disc, including the With My Sorrows EP from the same era.

Black Tape for a Blue Girl's Sam Rosenthal described the album as "an album of rebirth – the internal analysis and exploration that paves the way for a major upheaval."

== Critical reception ==
Professional ratings
Review scores
Source	Rating
AllMusic	4.5/5 stars

AllMusic critic Ned Raggett wrote that Remnants of a Deeper Purity "succeeds like no other Black Tape release before it, the logical extension of Rosenthal's musical and lyrical foci into a lengthy, commanding, and beautiful experience." He ranked it at number 93 on his list of the best albums of the 1990s for Freaky Trigger.

== Track listing ==
No.	Title	Length
1.	"Redefine Pure Faith"	5:19
2.	"Fin de siècle"	5:53
3.	"With My Sorrows"	7:03
4.	"For You Will Burn Your Wings Upon the Sun"	26:20
5.	"Wings Tattered, Fallen"	6:25
6.	"Fitful"	4:56
7.	"Remnants of a Deeper Purity"	4:36
8.	"Again, to Drift (For Veronika)"	6:00
9.	"I Have No More Answers"	10:33

10th anniversary edition bonus disc
No.	Title	Length
1.	"En la mar ay una torre"	0:59
2.	"With My Sorrows Part 2"	10:13
3.	"With My Sorrows Part 3"	6:25
4.	"I Have No More Answers" (radio edit)	3:39
5.	"Redefine Pure Faith" (live)	4:32
6.	"Through Sky Blue Rooms" (live)	2:29
7.	"Remnants of a Deeper Purity" (live)	3:57
8.	"Across a Thousand Blades '96"	3:55
9.	Untitled	2:05
