= A Day in the Stark Corner =

Studio album by Lycia
- Released: 10 June 1993
- Recorded: August 1991 – June 1992
- Studio: Lycium, Mesa, AZ
- Genre: Dark wave, ethereal wave
- Length: 57:11
- Label: Projekt
- Producer: Lycia

Lycia chronology
Ionia (1991)	A Day in the Stark Corner (1993)	Live (1994)

A Day in the Stark Corner is the third studio album by the American Dark Wave band Lycia, released on 10 June 1993 by Projekt Records.

== Recording ==
Mike VanPortfleet has attributed a lack of quality recording equipment as having a profound effect on Stark Corner's sound.

== Reception ==
Professional ratings
Review scores
Source	Rating
AllMusic	4/5 stars

Ned Raggett of AllMusic gave it 4 out of 5 stars, describing it as being "a series of similar sounding pieces which work wonderfully as an extended mood setter."

In MK Ultra Issue No. 1, (1995) Peter Steele of Type O Negative said

You should be familiar with Lycia. It's dark, ambient Goth music. The last album is called A Day in the Stark Corner. I would like our next album to sound something like this. It is the most depressing thing I've ever heard in my life. If I put it on in the morning when I get up... I'm useless for the rest of the day. It makes me feel like killing myself. It's like, why even bother getting dressed when I can just slit my wrists. Such simple hypnotic beats. Everything is drowned in reverb, yet the emotion comes through so loud and clear. It's just devastatingly beautiful, as beautiful as it is devastating. That's how I want to come through.

== Track listing ==
All tracks are written by Mike VanPortfleet.

No.	Title	Length
1.	"And Through the Smoke and Nails"	6:51
2.	"Pygmallion"	5:58
3.	"The Body Electric"	5:20
4.	"Wide Open Spaces"	6:47
5.	"The Morning Breaks So Cold and Gray"	7:37
6.	"The Remnants and the Ruins"	6:53
7.	"Goddess of the Green Fields"	2:34
8.	"Everything Is Cold"	3:25
9.	"Sorrow Is Her Name"	5:40
10.	"Daphne"	6:03

== Personnel ==
Adapted from the A Day in the Stark Corner liner notes.

Lycia

- Mike VanPortfleet – vocals, instruments, mixing

Additional musicians and production

- Sam Rosenthal – mixing

== Release history ==
Region	Date	Label	Format	Catalog
United States	1993	Projekt	CD, CS	PRO40
