= Quiet Moments (album) =

Studio album by Lycia
- Released: August 20, 2013
- Recorded: December 2006–January 2013 at Lycium Music, Mesa, AZ
- Genre: Dark wave, ethereal wave
- Length: 63:58
- Label: Handmade Birds

Lycia chronology
Fifth Sun (2010)	Quiet Moments (2013)	A Line That Connects (2015)

Professional ratings
Review scores
Source	Rating
Pitchfork Media	(7.8/10)
PopMatters	(8/10)

Quiet Moments is the ninth studio album by Lycia, released by Handmade Birds on August 20, 2013. It marks the first album of new studio material by the band since Empty Space, released ten years prior.

== Track listing ==
All tracks are written by Mike VanPortfleet, except "The Soil is Dead" with lyrics by Tara VanFlower.

No.	Title	Length
1.	"Quiet Moments"	8:16
2.	"The Visitor"	4:32
3.	"Antarctica"	8:14
4.	"Greenland"	8:27
5.	"Grand Rapids"	5:51
6.	"The Pier"	3:34
7.	"Spring Trees"	4:35
8.	"The Wind Sings"	4:32
9.	"Dead Leaves Fall"	5:18
10.	"Dead Star, Cold Star"	5:33
11.	"The Soil is Dead"	5:01

== Personnel ==
Lycia

- Mike VanPortfleet – vocals, synthesizer, guitar, drum machine

Production and Additional Personnel

- James Plotkin – mastering
- Tara VanFlower – additional vocals (7, 11)

== Release history ==
Region	Date	Label	Format	Catalog
United States	2013	Handmade Birds	CD	HBDIS-066
