= The Rope (album) =

Studio album by Black Tape for a Blue Girl
- Released: 1986
- Genre: Dark wave; ethereal wave
- Label: Projekt Records

Black Tape for a Blue Girl chronology
The Rope (1986)	Mesmerized by the Sirens (1987)

Professional ratings
Review scores
Source	Rating
AllMusic	3/5 stars

The Rope is the debut album by the darkwave band Black Tape for a Blue Girl. It was released on vinyl in 1986 by Projekt Records. Later cassette and CD versions were released.

In 2026, Uncut ranked The Rope at number 169 in their list of "The 200 Greatest Goth Albums", writing how the electronic-based band "spun a unique thread of ambient darkwave, neoclassical exoticism and dark cabaret on their relatively bare-boned and lo-fi debut album."

== Track listing ==
1. "Memory, Uncaring Friend" – (Sam Rosenthal, Allan Kraut) - 3:40
  - Oscar Herrera - vocals
  - Sam Rosenthal - electronics
  - Allan Kraut - guitar, bass, drums
2. "Hide in Yourself" – (Sam Rosenthal, Allan Kraut) - 3:58
  - Kim Prior - vocals
  - Oscar Herrera - vocals
  - Sam Rosenthal - electronics, drum programming
  - Allan Kraut - guitar, bass, drum machine
3. "Within These Walls" – (Sam Rosenthal) - 3:47
  - Kim Prior - vocals
  - Oscar Herrera - vocals
  - Adam Buhler - guitar
  - Sam Rosenthal - electronics
  - Allan Kraut - bass
4. "The Holy Terrors" – (Sam Rosenthal) - 2:03
  - Kim Prior - vocals
  - Oscar Herrera - vocals
  - Sam Rosenthal - electronics
  - Allan Kraut - drums
5. "End" – (Sam Rosenthal) - 2:22
  - Kim Prior - vocals
  - Oscar Herrera - vocals
  - Candy Sherlock - violin
  - Sam Rosenthal - electronics
6. "Seven Days Till Sunrise" – (Sam Rosenthal) - 2:16
  - Richard Watson - clarinet
  - Cauleen Smith - cello
  - Greg Wilson - guitar
7. "The Rope" – (Sam Rosenthal) - 3:12
  - Kim Prior - vocals
  - Oscar Herrera - vocals
  - Richard Watson - clarinet
  - Candy Sherlock - violin
  - Sam Rosenthal - electronics
8. "The Few Remaining Threads" – (Sam Rosenthal) - 3:24
  - Candy Sherlock - violin
  - Sam Rosenthal - electronics
  - Allan Kraut - drums
9. "The Lingering Flicker" – (Sam Rosenthal) - 5:54
  - Lara Radford - violin
  - Sam Rosenthal - electronics
10. "Slow Blur" – (Sam Rosenthal) - 5:09
  - Lara Radford - violin
  - Sam Rosenthal - electronics
11. "The Floor Was Hard but Home" – (Sam Rosenthal) - 3:34
  - Kim Prior - vocals
  - Greg Wilson - guitar
  - Sam Rosenthal - electronics
12. "We Return" – (Sam Rosenthal) - 4:13
  - Kim Prior - vocals
  - Oscar Herrera - vocals
  - Sean Whitehead - vocals
  - Candy Sherlock - violin
  - Sam Rosenthal - electronics
  - Robin Russell - voice
