= Mesmerized by the Sirens =

Studio album by Black Tape for a Blue Girl
- Released: 1987
- Genre: Dark wave; ethereal wave
- Label: Projekt Records

Black Tape for a Blue Girl chronology
The Rope (1986)	Mesmerized by the Sirens (1987)	Ashes in the Brittle Air (1989)

Professional ratings
Review scores
Source	Rating
Allmusic	3/5 stars

Mesmerized by the Sirens is the second studio album by the darkwave band Black Tape for a Blue Girl. It was released on vinyl in 1987 by Projekt Records. "The Sawdust Scatter" was remixed for the later cassette and CD versions.

== Track listing ==
No.	Title	Composer	Length
1.	"Jamais Pars"	Sam Rosenthal	2:10
2.	"A Teardrop Left Behind"	Walter Holland / Sam Rosenthal	6:54
3.	"Dark Skinned and Inviting"	Sam Rosenthal	2:19
4.	"Lie Broken, Bleeding"	Sam Rosenthal	3:10
5.	"Hairline Sunlight"	Walter Holland / Sam Rosenthal	1:16
6.	"With a Million Tears"	Sam Rosenthal	5:57
7.	"The Sawdust Scatter"	Sam Rosenthal	2:42
8.	"Beneath The Planks"	Sam Rosenthal	4:35
9.	"Scream, My Shallow"	Sam Rosenthal	8:23
10.	"Seireenien Lumoama"	Sam Rosenthal	5:50
Total length:			43:18

== Personnel ==
- Sam Rosenthal – Piano (tracks 2, 10), Electronics, Lyrics, Artwork
- Oscar Herrera – Vocals (tracks 2, 7, 8, 9)
- Sue-Kenny Smith – Vocals (tracks 1, 2, 10), Guitar (tracks 1, 3, 10)
- Walter Holland – Guitar (tracks 2, 5), Vocals on track 4
- Allan Kraut – Drums (tracks 4, 7, 9)
- Bridget Knott – Vocals on track 3
- Kim Prior – Vocals on track 9
- Thomas Anthony (2) – Piano on track 9
- Richard Watson – Clarinet on track 8
- Miira Ojanen – Voice (tracks 4, 10)
- Bobbi Jo Gamble – Voice on track 2
- Dimitri Patakidis – Voice on track 10
- Chris Sommovigo – Voice [Synth] on track 2
