= In Flickers =

Studio album by Lycia
- Released: October 26, 2018
- Studio: Lycium Music (Mesa, Arizona)
- Genre: Gothic rock; ethereal wave
- Length: 43:28
- Label: Projekt
- Producer: David Galas; Mike VanPortfleet; Tara VanFlower

Lycia chronology
A Line That Connects (2015)	In Flickers (2018)

In Flickers is the eleventh studio album by Lycia, released on October 26, 2018 by Projekt Records.

== Reception ==
I Die: You Die gave In Flickers a positive review and said "fans of the band's classic sound should still find plenty to enjoy here – standout "The Path" is a gentle and forlorn strummy elegy that could have been plucked from any of their classic LPs – but the real meat of the record is in the new wrinkles they explore."

== Track listing ==
No.	Title	Writer(s)	Length
1.	"In Flickers"	David Galas; Mike VanPortfleet; Tara VanFlower	2:52
2.	"A Failure"	John Fair; VanPortfleet	4:57
3.	"The Path"	VanPortfleet; VanFlower	5:35
4.	"She"	VanPortfleet	4:09
5.	"25 Years"	Galas; VanPortfleet	4:12
6.	"Mist"	Fair; VanPortfleet	4:40
7.	"34 Palms"	VanPortfleet	4:51
8.	"Rewrite"	Galas; VanPortfleet; VanFlower	2:55
9.	"Late Night Solitude"	Galas; VanPortfleet	4:16
10.	"Autumn into Winter"	Galas; VanPortfleet; VanFlower	5:00

== Personnel ==
Adapted from the In Flickers liner notes.

Lycia

- David Galas – vocals, guitars, synthesizer, drum programming, production, recording
- Tara VanFlower – vocals, production, recording
- Mike VanPortfleet – vocals, production, recording, photography

Additional performers

- John Fair – synthesizer, drum programming
- Dirk VanPortfleet – Chau gong

Production and design

- Martin Bowes – mastering

== Release history ==
Region	Date	Label	Format	Catalog
United States	2018	Projekt	CD, DL, LP	PROJEKT352
