= A Line That Connects =

Studio album by Lycia
- Released: August 21, 2015
- Recorded: Lycium Music (Mesa, Arizona)
- Genres: Dark wave, ethereal wave
- Length: 68:24
- Label: Handmade Birds
- Producer: Lycia

Lycia chronology
Quiet Moments (2013)	A Line That Connects (2015)	In Flickers (2018)

A Line That Connects is the tenth studio album by Lycia, released by Handmade Birds on August 21, 2015.

== Track listing ==
All tracks are written by Lycia.

No.	Title	Length
1.	"The Fall Back"	2:42
2.	"Monday Is Here"	5:56
3.	"Silver Leaf"	5:51
4.	"A Trade Out"	4:30
5.	"Blue"	6:14
6.	"An Awakening"	3:02
7.	"The Rain"	3:06
8.	"Bright Like Stars"	5:41
9.	"The Light Room"	3:30
10.	"Illuminate"	7:41
11.	"A Ghost Ascends"	4:13
12.	"Hiraeth"	6:10
13.	"Autumn Moon"	5:36
14.	"The Only Way Through Is Out"	4:12

== Personnel ==
Adapted from the A Line That Connects liner notes.

Lycia

- David Galas – electric guitar, acoustic guitar, synthesizer, drum programming, mixing, lead vocals (7, 13)
- Mike VanPortfleet – lead vocals, electric guitar, acoustic guitar, synthesizer
- Tara VanFlower – lead vocals

Additional musicians

- Michael Irwin – backing vocals (11)
- Sera Timms – backing vocals (12)

Production and additional personnel

- Lycia – production, recording
- James Plotkin – mastering
- David "Slaya" Smith – photography

== Release history ==
Region	Date	Label	Format	Catalog
United States	2015	Handmade Birds	CD	HBDIS-085
