= Vane (album) =

Studio album by Bleak
- Released: 1995
- Recorded: November 1993–February 1994
- Studio: The Boiler Room (Tempe, Arizona)
- Genre: Dark wave; ethereal wave
- Length: 60:57
- Label: Projekt
- Producer: Lycia

Lycia chronology
Live (1994)	Vane (1995)	The Burning Circle and Then Dust (1995)

Vane is the only studio album by Bleak, an offshoot of the band Lycia, released in 1995 by Projekt Records.

== Reception ==
Professional ratings
Review scores
Source	Rating
AllMusic	4/5 stars

AllMusic awarded Vane four out of five stars and said "for every more familiar Lycia element there's something extra – more electronic noises, a playing down of the guitar in favor of other instruments, odd drum patterns – to mitigate against any of this being simply the equivalent of outtakes from the main band's work." I Die: You Die said "Vane was distinct from Lycia not so much in terms of instrumentation but intent; where contemporary records from the latter project were focused on finding a balance between lushness and severity, Bleak would largely forgo any sense of comfort for, well, bleakness."

== Track listing ==
All tracks are written by David Galas and Mike VanPortfleet.

No.	Title	Length
1.	"The Boiler Room"	5:00
2.	"Cold Black Room"	4:25
3.	"The Weather Vane"	3:32
4.	"A Crack in the Window"	1:46
5.	"Rain Dance"	3:59
6.	"The Top of the World"	3:44
7.	"Grey Clouds"	5:04
8.	"An Endless View"	4:11
9.	"In Vain"	4:55
10.	"Burn"	3:16
11.	"One Last Breath"	3:37
12.	"Sun Beats Hard"	2:52
13.	"Deep Blue Sky"	4:09
14.	"Darkness"	4:37
15.	"Forever and Ever"	6:00

== Personnel ==
Adapted from the Vane liner notes.

Bleak

- David Galas – synthesizer, drum machine
- Mike VanPortfleet – vocals, synthesizer, guitar, drum machine

Production and additional personnel

- Bleak – mixing
- Susan Jennings – photography

== Release history ==
Region	Date	Label	Format	Catalog
United States	1995	Projekt	CD	PRO53
