= Before the Buildings Fell =

Studio album by Sam Rosenthal
- Released: 1986
- Genre: Dark ambient
- Label: Projekt Records; PRO 24

Before the Buildings Fell a solo album by dark ambient artist Sam Rosenthal, a member of Black Tape for a Blue Girl and founder of Projekt Records. It was released in 1986 by Projekt Records and reissued on CD in 2000 with enhanced content.

== Track listing ==
1. "Kathryn"
2. "Diversion"
3. "Resolution"
4. "The Room"
5. "Jane"
6. "Leading to the Edge"
7. "Before the Buildings Fell"
8. "Fragments of Benediction"
9. "The Amber Girl"
