= Wake (Lycia album) =

Studio album by Lycia
- Released: 1989
- Recorded: March 1989
- Studio: The Cave, Tempe, AZ
- Genre: Darkwave, ethereal wave
- Length: 25:01
- Label: Orphanage; Projekt (re-issue)
- Producer: Lycia

Lycia chronology
Wake (1989)	Ionia (1991)

Professional ratings
Review scores
Source	Rating
AllMusic	3/5 stars

Wake is the debut studio album of Lycia, released in March 1989 through Orphanage Records.

== Track listing ==
All tracks are written by John Fair and Mike VanPortfleet.

Side One
No.	Title	Length
1.	"Nothing"	3:52
2.	"Wake"	3:54
3.	"The Bells"	4:14

Side Two
No.	Title	Length
1.	"This Decline"	4:11
2.	"From Foam"	3:08
3.	"Down"	3:42

1993 remastered CD
No.	Title	Length
1.	"Nothing"	3:52
2.	"Wake"	3:54
3.	"This Decline"	4:11
4.	"Sing Like Sirens"	4:04
5.	"Incinerate"	3:49
6.	"Time"	4:17
7.	"The Bells"	4:14
8.	"From Foam"	3:08
9.	"Down There"	3:42

== Personnel ==
Adapted from the Wake liner notes.

- John Fair – bass guitar, drum machine
- Mike VanPortfleet – vocals, guitar

== Release history ==
Region	Date	Label	Format	Catalog
United States	1989	Orphanage	CS	
United States	1993	Projekt	CD	PRO31
