= Ionia (album) =

Studio album by Lycia
- Released: 1991
- Recorded: February 25–June 29, 1991
- Studio: Lycium, Mesa, AZ
- Genre: Dark wave, ethereal wave
- Length: 58:19
- Label: Projekt
- Producer: Lycia

Lycia chronology
Wake (1989)	Ionia (1991)	A Day in the Stark Corner (1993)

Ionia is the second studio album by the American dark wave band Lycia, released in 1991 by Projekt Records.

== Reception ==
Professional ratings
Review scores
Source	Rating
AllMusic	3/5 stars

Ned Raggett of AllMusic gave it 3 out of 5 stars, saying "it's excellent mood music, if you like that kind of mood."

== Track listing ==
All tracks are written by Lycia, except "Renewal" by Mark Gill & Will Welch.

No.	Title	Length
1.	"Ionia"	5:09
2.	"A Brief Glimpse"	4:39
3.	"November"	2:06
4.	"Fate"	5:49
5.	"Desert"	4:55
6.	"Renewal"	3:16
7.	"This Moment"	5:55
8.	"Monsoon I (Anticipation)"	3:30
9.	"Monsoon II (Aftermath)"	4:00
10.	"Granada"	5:56
11.	"The Realization"	6:09
12.	"Distant Eastern Glare"	6:49

== Personnel ==
Lycia

- Mike VanPortfleet – vocals, instruments, mixing

Additional musicians and production

- Susan Jennings – photography
- Sam Rosenthal – mixing
- Will Welch – sampler (8)

== Release history ==
Region	Date	Label	Format	Catalog
United States	1991	Projekt	CD, CS	PRO32
