= Dewdrops Records =

Defunct American alternative rock label

- Founded: 1993
- Founder: Brant Nelson; Pat Mannion
- Defunct: 2002
- Status: Inactive
- Distributor: Plan Eleven (Canada)
- Genre: Alternative rock
- Country of origin: United States
- Location: Los Angeles, California

Dewdrops Records, an outgrowth of an "uncommon music" fanzine run by members of a Cocteau Twins fanclub, was an alternative-rock record label active from 1993 until 2002. It was the joint project of Brant Nelson and Pat Mannion.

== History ==
Dewdrops Records' first release was Thurtene (1993), a tribute to the British record label 4AD featuring 13 bands and 13 covers. Unsigned bands such as Hover, Red Zoo, and Orange appeared on the CD with covers of well-known 4AD songs like "Gigantic", "I Melt with You", and "Where Is My Mind?" Splashed With Many a Speck (1997) came not long after and was a second tribute album, this one featuring Faith & Disease, Lanterna, Love Spirals Downwards, The Curtain Society, and Chicklet. This compilation was notable in that it featured the exclusive US release of a Cocteau Twins track "Touch Upon Touch" that had previously only been included on British compilation Volume 5. The label's final release was Half Gifts: A Tribute to the Cocteau Twins, released in 2003.

== Discography ==
- Thurtene – A Collection of 4AD Covers (1993)
  - Featuring: The Moon Seven Times, Hover, Immer Essen, Livia, Red Zoo, Independent Mechanical Industry, GLE, Clarity, Orange, The Gosh Guys, Floral Majority, Firecracker, and Tel Basta
- Orange (1994) – Orange
- Glisten (1995) – Elysium
- Almost Everything (1995) – Hover
- Dewdrops Primer 1996 (1996)
  - Featuring: Elysium, Hover, Orange, The Moon Seven Times
- Splashed With Many a Speck (1997)
- Mandorla (2002) – Jane Rigler and Agustí Fernández
- Half-Gifts: A Tribute to the Cocteau Twins (2002)
  - Featuring: Trance to the Sun, Translucia, An April March, Numeralia, Sugar Hiccup, Bethany Curve, Siddal, Subdew, Neil Impelluso, Halou, The Von Trapps, and Pumalin
