= The Burning Circle and Then Dust =

Studio album by Lycia
- Released: April 3, 1995
- Recorded: April – December 1994
- Studios: Boiler Room, Tempe, AZ
- Genres: Dark wave, ethereal wave
- Length: 1:56:25
- Label: Projekt
- Producer: Lycia

Lycia chronology
Vane (1995)	The Burning Circle and Then Dust (1995)	Cold (1996)

The Burning Circle and Then Dust is the fourth studio album by the American dark wave band Lycia, released on April 3, 1995, by Projekt Records. It was remastered and edited to fit on a single disc and re-released by Silber Records in 2006.

== Reception ==
Professional ratings
Review scores
Source	Rating
AllMusic	4/5 stars

Ned Raggett of AllMusic gave it 4 out of 5 stars, praising it as being "a high point of American dark rock" and the band's greatest and most ambitious work.

=== Accolades ===
Publication	Country	Accolade	Year	Rank
Ned Raggett	United States	The Top 136 Albums of the Nineties	1999	124

== Track listing ==
All songs composed by Lycia.

Disc 1
No.	Title	Length
1.	"A Presence in the Woods"	4:09
2.	"Wandering Soul"	4:47
3.	"The Dust Settles" (part 1)	1:52
4.	"Sleepless"	3:27
5.	"The Dust Settles" (part 2)	1:29
6.	"The Return of Nothing"	4:43
7.	"The Dust Settles" (part 3)	2:54
8.	"Pray"	5:20
9.	"The Better Things to Come"	4:32
10.	"On the Horizon"	3:10
11.	"Where Has All the Time Gone"	3:13
12.	"Silence and Distance"	3:31
13.	"Anywhere But Home"	3:57
14.	"In the Fire and Flames"	2:12
15.	"Slip Away"	6:17
16.	"The Last Day"	4:27

Disc 2
No.	Title	Length
1.	"August" (part 1)	4:39
2.	"Nine Hours Later"	4:46
3.	"Nimble"	3:43
4.	"August" (part 2)	6:13
5.	"The Facade Fades"	4:10
6.	"Resigned"	6:36
7.	"Surrender"	4:28
8.	"These Memories Pass"	9:18
9.	"The Burning Circle"	6:24
10.	"The New Day"	5:57

2006 Remastered Edition
No.	Title	Length
1.	"A Presence in the Woods"	4:11
2.	"Wandering Soul"	4:45
3.	"The Dust Settles (Part 1)"	1:54
4.	"Sleepless"	3:20
5.	"The Dust Settles (Part 2)"	1:24
6.	"The Return of Nothing"	4:46
7.	"The Dust Settles (Part 3)"	2:57
8.	"Pray"	5:19
9.	"On the Horizon"	3:02
10.	"Where Has All the Time Gone"	3:16
11.	"Silence and Distance"	3:34
12.	"Anywhere But Home"	3:54
13.	"Slip Away"	6:20
14.	"The Last Day"	4:17
15.	"Nine Hours Later"	4:48
16.	"Nimble"	3:40
17.	"Resigned"	6:36
18.	"Surrender"	4:18

== Personnel ==
Adapted from The Burning Circle and Then Dust liner notes.

Lycia

- David Galas – bass guitar, keyboards, engineering, programming
- Tara VanFlower – vocals
- Mike VanPortfleet – vocals, guitar, keyboards, programming

Production and additional personnel

- Kevin Gray – mastering
- Ryan Lum – mastering
- Lycia – production

== Release history ==
Region	Date	Label	Format	Catalog
United States	1995	Projekt	CD	PRO55
United States	2006	Silber	CD	silber 048
