= The Aflame EP =

EP by Black Tape for a Blue Girl
- Released: 1998
- Length: ??
- Label: Projekt Records

Black Tape for a Blue Girl chronology
With My Sorrows (1997)	The Aflame EP (1998)	As One Aflame Laid Bare by Desire (1999)

The Aflame EP is an EP by the band Black Tape for a Blue Girl. It was released in 1998 by Projekt Records.

== Track listing ==
1. "As One Aflame Laid Bare by Desire"
2. "Dulcinea"
3. "On Broken Shells of Crystal Dreams"
4. "Could I Stay the Honest One?"
