= 10 Neurotics =

Studio album by Black Tape for a Blue Girl
- Released: 2009
- Genre: Dark wave; dark cabaret
- Label: Projekt Records

Black Tape for a Blue Girl chronology
Halo Star (2004)	10 Neurotics (2009)

Professional ratings
Review scores
Source	Rating
Allmusic	4/5 stars

10 Neurotics is the tenth studio album by the band Black Tape for a Blue Girl. It was released September 22, 2009 by Projekt Records in America, and September 25, 2009 by Trisol Records in Germany.

Sam Rosenthal is joined by an all-new band: Brian Viglione (The Dresden Dolls & World/Inferno Friendship Society) plus vocalists Athan Maroulis (Spahn Ranch), Laurie Reade (Attrition) and Nicki Jaine. Guest appearances by Lucas Lanthier (Cinema Strange/The Deadfly Ensemble) on "Curious, Yet Ashamed." Guest appearances from Elysabeth Grant (vocals on "I Strike You Down"), Michael Laird (percussion on "Caught by a Stranger"), Lisa Feuer (flute on "Tell Me You've Taken Another") & Gregor Kitzis (violin on "Rotten Zurich Cafe")

== Track listing ==
1. "Sailor Boy"
2. "Inch Worm"
3. "Tell Me You’ve Taken Another"
4. "The Perfect Pervert"
5. "Marmalade Cat"
6. "Love Song"
7. "Rotten Zurich Cafe"
8. "Militärhymne"
9. "In Dystopia"
10. "The Pleasure in the Pain"
11. "I Strike You Down"
12. "Caught by a Stranger"
13. "Curious, Yet Ashamed"
14. "Love of the Father
