= Autumn's Grey Solace =

Neoclassical darkwave band from Atlanta, Georgia

- Origin: St. Augustine, Florida, United States
- Genres: Ethereal wave, dream pop
- Years active: 2000–present
- Label: Projekt Records
- Members: Erin Welton; Scott Ferrell

Autumn's Grey Solace is an American ethereal wave and dream pop duo from St. Augustine, Florida, United States. It consists of soprano vocalist and keyboardist Erin Welton and guitarist Scott Ferrell. They have released a total of eighteen albums (including 17 original albums and 1 best-of compilation) since 2002.

== History ==
The band began recording their first album, Within the Depths of a Darkened Forest, in 2000, and was released in 2002. Afterwards they continued to record and write new songs, and were signed to Projekt Records in 2004. Later that year they released their second album, Over the Ocean on Projekt Records. In 2005 they released their third album, Riverine and in 2006 released their fourth, Shades of Grey. On May 6, 2008, their fifth album, Ablaze was released. This album received very positive reviews and was advertised on the front page of Projekt Records' website.

Their sixth studio album, Eifelian was released on February 8, 2011. Their seventh studio album, Divinian was released on October 2, 2012. Their eighth studio album, Monajjfyllen was released on December 13, 2014. Their ninth studio album, Windumæra was released on June 11, 2016, with high resolution downloads available at their bandcamp page. Their tenth studio album, Celestial Realms was released on July 1, 2017. Their eleventh studio album, Eocene was released on September 22, 2018. Their twelfth studio album, Englelícra was released on November 1, 2019.

=== Compilations ===
Autumn's Grey Solace contributed to Projekt Records' "Projekt Holiday Single No. 1" in 2004 with the song "Through The Snowy Trees". They also covered the song "Musica Eternal" by Dead Can Dance for the tribute album Summoning of the Muse - A Tribute to Dead Can Dance in 2005.

Winterrim is a selection of songs taken from their albums Over the Ocean through Eifelian, which was released on October 1, 2012.

== Musical style and influences ==
Autumn's Grey Solace is primarily characterized as ethereal wave and dream pop, expanding on the sound of the pioneering bands Cocteau Twins and Dead Can Dance and featuring lush effects-laden guitars and expressive, layered vocals. They are also often compared to Projekt Records labelmates Love Spirals Downwards and Lycia. Some of their material was classified and promoted by their former record label as gothic rock, darkwave and shoegaze, appealing to "fans of heavenly voices, shoegazer guitars and gothic romanticism".

The band has cited Dead Can Dance, Cocteau Twins, The Cure and The Smiths as their main influences, while Lisa Gerrard, Morrissey, and Madonna inspired Erin's vocals.

== Discography ==
- Within the Depths of a Darkened Forest (2002)
- Over the Ocean (2004)
- Riverine (2005)
- Shades of Grey (2006)
- Ablaze (2008)
- Eifelian (2011)
- Winterrim (2012)
- Divinian (2012)
- Monajjfyllen (2014)
- Windumæra (2016)
- Celestial Realms (2017)
- Eocene (2018)
- Englelícra (2019)
- XIII (2021)
- Therium (2022)
- Cease to Exist (2023)
- The Dark Space (2025)
- The Neverending (2026)
