= Beyond the Horizon Line =

Studio album by Mike VanPortfleet
- Released: September 14, 2004
- Recorded: September 2003 – March 2004
- Studios: Lycium Music, Mesa, AZ
- Genre: Ambient
- Length: 61:47
- Label: Silber
- Producer: Mike VanPortfleet

Professional ratings
Review scores
Source	Rating
AllMusic	4/5 stars

Beyond the Horizon Line is the debut solo album of Lycia front man Mike VanPortfleet, released on September 14, 2004 by Silber Records.

== Track listing ==
All music is composed by Mike VanPortfleet.

No.	Title	Length
1.	"Deep in the Morning Sun"	7:28
2.	"Echoes of the Lost Sea"	3:26
3.	"Towards the Blinding Glare"	7:27
4.	"The Call of the Horizon Line"	3:54
5.	"Stellar Buckshot Awaits"	7:23
6.	"Night Sky Illumination"	7:33
7.	"Dark Gateway"	3:15
8.	"Strange Star Transmissions"	6:10
9.	"Stellar Shower Begins"	7:34
10.	"Unsettled New Day"	7:37

== Personnel ==
Adapted from the Beyond the Horizon Line liner notes.

- Mike VanPortfleet – instruments, photography

== Release history ==
Region	Date	Label	Format	Catalog
United States	2004	Silber	CD	silber 034
