= Ashes in the Brittle Air =

Studio album by Black Tape for a Blue Girl
- Released: 1989
- Genre: Dark wave; ethereal wave
- Length: 42:12
- Label: Projekt Records

Black Tape for a Blue Girl chronology
Mesmerized by the Sirens (1987)	Ashes in the Brittle Air (1989)	A Chaos of Desire (1991)

Professional ratings
Review scores
Source	Rating
Allmusic	3/5 stars

Ashes in the Brittle Air is the third album by the darkwave band Black Tape for a Blue Girl. It was released in 1989 by Projekt Records and contains one of their best known songs, "Across a Thousand Blades" sung by Oscar Herrera.

== Track listing ==
1. "Ashes in the Brittle Air" — 4:01
2. "Across a Thousand Blades" — 3:40
3. "The Touch and the Darkness" — 2:58
4. "Through Sky Blue Rooms" — 1:36
5. "The Scar of a Poet" — 7:29
6. "You Tangle Within Me" — 4:25
7. "From the Tightrope" — 4:46
8. "Am I so Deceived" — 5:10
9. "Is It Love That Dare Not Be?" — 2:17
10. "I Ran to You" — 3:28
11. "I Wish You Could Smile" — 2:58
