= A Chaos of Desire =

Studio album by Black Tape for a Blue Girl
- Released: 1991
- Genre: Dark wave; neoclassical dark wave; ethereal wave; dark ambient
- Label: Projekt

Black Tape for a Blue Girl chronology
Ashes in the Brittle Air (1989)	A Chaos of Desire (1991)	This Lush Garden Within (1993)

Professional ratings
Review scores
Source	Rating
Allmusic	4/5 stars

A Chaos of Desire is the fourth studio album by the Darkwave band Black Tape for a Blue Girl. It was released in 1991 by Projekt Records.

== Track listing ==
Source: Projekt Records

1. These Fleeting Moments
2. A Chaos of Desire
3. Pandora's Box
4. Tear Love from My Mind
5. The Hypocrite Is Me
6. Beneath the Icy Floe
7. We Watch Our Sad-eyed Angel Fall
8. One Last Breath
9. Of These Reminders
10. How Can You Forget Love?
11. Chains of Color
12. Could I Stay the Honest One?
