= As One Aflame Laid Bare by Desire =

Studio album by Black Tape for a Blue Girl
- Released: 1999
- Genre: Dark wave; neoclassical dark wave; ethereal wave
- Length: 1:11:28
- Label: Projekt

Black Tape for a Blue Girl chronology
Remnants of a Deeper Purity (1996)	As One Aflame Laid Bare by Desire (1999)	The Scavenger Bride (2002)

Professional ratings
Review scores
Source	Rating
Allmusic	4/5 stars
Robert Christgau	(dud)

As One Aflame Laid Bare by Desire is the seventh studio album by the Darkwave band Black Tape for a Blue Girl. It was released in 1999 by Projekt Records. It owes some artistic inspiration to Marcel Duchamp.

== Track listing ==
1. "As One Aflame Laid Bare by Desire" - 7:19
2. "Given" (1. the Waterfall 2. the Illuminating Gas) - 4:20
3. "Entr'acte [the Garden Awaits Us]" - 1:33
4. "Tell Me You've Taken Another" - 5:17
5. "Entr'acte [the Carnival Barker]" - 1:00
6. "Dream" - 1:53
7. "The Apotheosis" - 6:19
8. "Russia" - 6:41
9. "Your One Wish" - 1:29
10. "Dulcinea" - 6:14
11. "The Green Box" - 6:38
12. "Denouement / Denouncement" - 6:52
13. "The Passage" - 15:47

== Band Personnel Shift ==
This album saw the return of vocalist Julianna Towns (of the band Skinner Box, who first appeared on A Chaos of Desire), replacing vocalist Lucan. Julianna left the band again after a pre-release promotional tour. This was the last album to feature original male vocalist Oscar Herrera, who sang on two tracks.
