= InnerZone =

Studio album by Steve Roach, Vidna Obmana
- Released: August 2002
- Recorded: 2001–2002
- Studio: Serenity Studio, Belgium and the Timeroom, Tucson (mixing)
- Genre: Ambient, electronic
- Length: 73:24
- Label: Projekt Records
- Producer: Steve Roach, Vidna Obmana

Steve Roach chronology
Pure Flow (2001)	InnerZone (2002)	Trance Spirits (2002)

Professional ratings
Review scores
Source	Rating
Allmusic	4.5/5 stars

InnerZone is the fifth collaborative album by American ambient musicians Steve Roach and Belgian Vidna Obmana, containing a echoes of desert ambience, rhythmic ambience, space music, and electro-tribal ambience.

== Reception ==
AllMusic rated the album a 4.5 of 5, stating "Vidna Obmana (aka Dirk Serries) and Steve Roach have outdone themselves". In conclusion, he said "This CD is destined to be a classic. It will appeal to all e-music fans."

== Track listing ==
No.	Title	Length
1.	"At the Edge of Everything"	6:08
2.	"Strands"	8:39
3.	"Cloud Space"	6:18
4.	"Encounter Passage"	2:13
5.	"Isolation"	14:04
6.	"Spires"	10:39
7.	"InnerZone"	25:23

== Personnel ==
Adapted from Discogs.

- Sam Rosenthal – cover design
- Roger King – mastering
- Steve Roach – mixing
- Steve Roach, Vidna Obmana – music
- Martina Verhoeven – photography
