= This Lush Garden Within =

Studio album by Black Tape for a Blue Girl
- Released: 1993
- Genre: Neoclassical dark wave; ethereal wave
- Length: 54:37
- Label: Projekt Records

Black Tape for a Blue Girl chronology
A Chaos of Desire (1991)	This Lush Garden Within (1993)	Remnants of a Deeper Purity (1996)

Professional ratings
Review scores
Source	Rating
AllMusic	3/5 stars

This Lush Garden Within is the fifth studio album by the Darkwave band Black Tape for a Blue Girl. It was released in 1993 by Projekt Records.

== Track listing ==
1. "Left, Unsaid"
2. "The Broken Glass"
3. "We Exist, Entwined"
4. "Overwhelmed, Beneath Me"
5. "This Lush Garden Within"
6. "The Christ in the Desert"
7. "The Turbulence and the Torment"
8. "The Flow of Our Spirit"
9. "Into the Garden"
10. "Decomposed by the Fire of the Firmament"
11. "Gravity's Angel" (Laurie Anderson cover)
12. "On Broken Shells of Crystal Dreams"
13. "Our Future Imagined"
