= The Scavenger Bride =

Studio album by Black Tape for a Blue Girl
- Released: 2002
- Genre: Dark wave; ethereal wave; neofolk
- Length: 51:15
- Label: Projekt Records

Black Tape for a Blue Girl chronology
As One Aflame Laid Bare by Desire (1999)	The Scavenger Bride (2002)	Halo Star (2004)

Professional ratings
Review scores
Source	Rating
Allmusic	4/5 stars

The Scavenger Bride is the eighth studio album by the Darkwave band Black Tape for a Blue Girl. It was released in America in 2002 by Projekt Records. It was subsequently released in Mexico on Samadhi and in Russia on Irond Records.

== Track listing ==
1. "The Scavenger Bride"
2. "Kinski"
3. "All My Lovers"
4. "Shadow of a Doubt"
5. "The Doorkeeper"
6. "Floats in the Updrafts"
7. "A Livery of Bachelors"
8. "Das Liselottenbett"
9. "The Lie Which Refuses to Die"
10. "The Scavenger's Daughter"
11. "Like a Dog/Letter to Brod"
12. "The Whipper"
13. "Bastille Day, 1961"

== Band Personnel Shift ==
The Scavenger Bride is the first album to include vocalist Elysabeth Grant, who had joined the band in 1999 to perform on the tour for As One Aflame Laid Bare By Desire. With Oscar Herrera no longer in the band, Bret Helm (of Audra) and Athan Maroulis (of Spahn Ranch) took over the male vocal duties.
