= Empty Space (album) =

Eighth studio album by Lycia

Studio album by Lycia
- Released: December 2, 2003
- Recorded: November – December 1999
- Studios: Lycium Music, Streetsboro, OH
- Genres: Dark wave, ethereal wave
- Length: 42:22
- Label: Silber
- Producer: Lycia

Lycia chronology
Tripping Back Into the Broken Days (2002)	Empty Space (2003)	Fifth Sun (2010)

Empty Space is the eighth studio album by Lycia, released on 2003 by Silber Records.

== Track listing ==
All tracks are written by Tara VanFlower and Mike VanPortfleet.

No.	Title	Length
1.	"Not Here, Not Anywhere"	4:32
2.	"You Can Never Go Home Again"	4:52
3.	"Persephone"	4:26
4.	"Fur & Thistle"	5:04
5.	"Hope is Here"	5:04
6.	"Violent Violet"	4:32
7.	"Bloody Basin"	4:49
8.	"The Long Drive"	5:05
9.	"This is the End"	3:58

== Personnel ==
Adapted from the Empty Space liner notes.

Lycia

- John Fair – drum programming
- David Galas – bass guitar
- Tara VanFlower – vocals, design
- Mike VanPortfleet – vocals, guitar, drum machine, design
