= Trance Spirits =

Studio album by Steve Roach, Jeffrey Fayman, Robert Fripp, Momodou Kah
- Released: 20 August 2002
- Studio: Grandma's Warehouse & the Timeroom, Tucson, AZ
- Genre: New age, ambient
- Length: 73:53
- Label: Projekt Records
- Producer: Steve Roach, Jeffrey Fayman

Steve Roach chronology
| InnerZone (2002) | Trance Spirits (2002) | Day Out of Time (2002) |

Professional ratings
Review scores
| Source | Rating |
|---|---|
| Allmusic | 4.5/5 stars |

Trance Spirits) is the collaborative album by American ambient musicians Steve Roach, Jeffrey Fayman and guest musicians Robert Fripp and Momodou Kah.

== Songs ==
The album starts with "Taking Flight," full of repetitive rhythms and themes, percussive groove. The title track, "Trance Spirits", begins with a slow series of rhythms and atmospheres. In the middle of the album, tracks "Off Spring", "Seekers" and "The Calling" are pure ambient soundscapes with percussive edges. "Year of the Horse" has a synthetic and electric rhythm. The final track, "In the Same Deep Water", contains ethereal drone themes with drumming by Fayman and Momodou Kah.

== Reception ==
AllMusic rated the album 4.5 out of 5, stating that, overall, "The sum total is a different direction for Roach and a deep and even transformational listening journey for anyone who takes the chance."

== Track listing ==
| No. | Title | Length |
|---|---|---|
| 1. | "Taking Flight" | 10:36 |
| 2. | "Trance Spirits" | 16:44 |
| 3. | "Off Spring" | 8:10 |
| 4. | "Seekers" | 7:20 |
| 5. | "The Calling" | 5:47 |
| 6. | "Year of the Horse" | 13:34 |
| 7. | "In the Same Deep Water" | 11:42 |

== Personnel ==
Adapted from Discogs and Bandcamp.

- Ralph Prata – artwork
- Steve Roach, Jeffrey Fayman – composer, mixing, producer
- Sam Rosenthal – cover design
- Steve Roach – guitar & synth soundworlds, shamanic percussion, ocarinas & hybrid grooves
- Roger King – mastering
- Jeffrey Fayman & Momodou Kah – percussion
- Robert Fripp – guitar soundscapes (tracks 1, 6, & 7)
