= Halo Star =

Studio album by Black Tape for a Blue Girl
- Released: 2004
- Genre: Dark wave; neoclassical dark wave; neofolk; dark cabaret
- Length: 47:10
- Label: Projekt Records

Black Tape for a Blue Girl chronology
The Scavenger Bride (2002)	Halo Star (2004)	10 Neurotics (2009)

Professional ratings
Review scores
Source	Rating
Allmusic	4/5 stars

Halo Star is the ninth studio album by the Darkwave band Black Tape for a Blue Girl. It was released in 2004 by Projekt Records. It includes one of the band's most popular songs, "Knock Three Times," which later appeared on the popular 2005 Projekt Presents: A Dark Cabaret compilation, remixed as "Knock Three Times (skinny kinda mix)." The album features the core line-up of Sam Rosenthal, Elysabeth Grant, Bret Helm, Michael Laird & Lisa Feuer. It was the last album to feature this version of the group.

== Track listing ==
1. "Glow"
2. "Tarnished"
3. "The Gravediggers"
4. "Your Love is Sweeter than Wine"
5. "Indefinable, Yet"
6. "Knock Three Times"
7. "Scarecrow"
8. "Damn Swan!"
9. "Already Forgotten"
10. "The Fourth Footstep"
11. "Dagger"
12. "Halo Star"
