= Black Tape for a Blue Girl =

American band

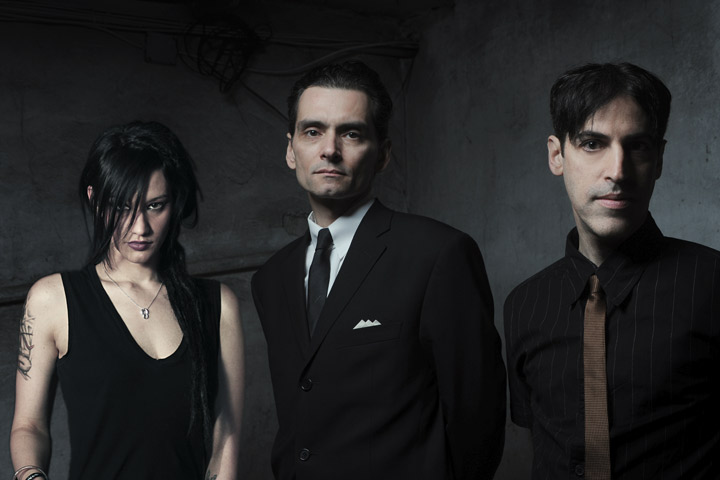
- Black Tape for a Blue Girl with their 2009/2010 lineup. From left to right, Valerie Gentile, Athan Maroulis and Sam Rosenthal

Background information
- Origin: United States
- Genres: Dark wave; ethereal wave; dark ambient
- Years active: 1986–present
- Labels: Projekt, Trisol
- Members: Sam Rosenthal; Jon DeRosa; Henrik Meierkord
- Past members: Lucian Casselman; Chase Dobson; Lisa Feuer; Valerie Gentile; Elysabeth Grant; Bret Helm; Danielle Herrera; Oscar Herrera; Nicki Jaine; Julia Kent; Michael Laird; Athan Maroulis; Michael Plaster; Laurie Reade; Mercury Shadow; Brian Viglione
- Website: blacktapeforabluegirl.com

Black Tape for a Blue Girl (often stylized as black tape for a blue girl) is an American band formed in 1986 by keyboardist/songwriter Sam Rosenthal, the founder of Projekt Records. The band's fans include director David Lynch, actress Sasha Grey, author Poppy Z. Brite, and paleontologist and author Caitlín R. Kiernan.

Their music has elements of dark wave, ethereal, ambient, neoclassical, and dark cabaret music. 1986's debut The Rope was listed at #169 in Uncut's Ultimate Record Collection: 200 Greatest Goth Albums. Their 13th album, The Cleft Serpent, was released on October 1, 2021 on Projekt Records.

== Biography ==
=== Formation/Oscar Herrera era (1986–1999) ===
Inspired by acts such as Orchestral Manoeuvres in the Dark, Tangerine Dream and Brian Eno, Projekt Records founder Sam Rosenthal established the California-based Black Tape for a Blue Girl as a vehicle for his musical compositions. Rosenthal served as songwriter, lyricist and producer for the band, who released their debut album The Rope in 1986. Along with Rosenthal, the band's line-up included Allan Kraut (on multiple instruments, including drums and guitars) and vocalist and guitarist Oscar Herrera. Guests included Kim Prior (as vocals), Adam Buhler (on guitar), Candy Sherlock and Lara Radford (as violinists).

Their second album, Mesmerized by the Sirens, was released a year later, followed by Ashes in the Brittle Air in 1989, A Chaos of Desire in 1991 and This Lush Garden Within in 1993. The core members through this period were Rosenthal and Herrera, with a variety of guest musicians. Julianna Towns, of the band Skinner Box, provided vocals, flute, and guitar on Chaos.

Recording of Remnants of a Deeper Purity began in 1995 in Los Angeles and was concluded in 1996 after Rosenthal's move to Chicago. This was the second album to feature Lucian Casselman on vocals and Vicki Richards on violin. It also featured Mera Roberts on cello. Remnants went on to become Black Tape for a Blue Girl's best selling release, and was the basis for the band's first live performance, Tuesday June 25, 1996 at Projektfest'96 in Chicago.

In 1999, the band released As One Aflame Laid Bare by Desire, with Oscar Herrera singing two songs on the album as a parting favor to Rosenthal. The album owes some artistic inspiration to Marcel Duchamp. Towns returned for female vocals and also provided guitar arrangements. After a 15 city tour in July 1998 in preparation for the album's release, she was ejected from the band. Elysabeth Grant joined the band as violist, but she soon became the lead vocalist during a 14 city tour in February 1999, which also featured Lisa Feuer on flute and backing vocals.

=== Elysabeth Grant era (1999–2008) ===
In late 1999, Rosenthal (and now ex-wife Feuer) moved to New York City. Recording began on the band's seventh studio album, The Scavenger Bride, with Elysabeth Grant as lead vocalist and violist. Original vocalist Oscar Herrera was no longer involved with the band, giving up male vocal duties to Bret Helm (of Audra) and Athan Maroulis (of Spahn Ranch). The Scavenger Bride was released in 2002, with only two live appearances, as Rosenthal and Feuer's son was born.

Two years later, the band released Halo Star, which shifted the vocal focus to Bret Helm. This album also marked a change in the band's lush, ethereal sound. It is the band's first journey into a dark cabaret musical style, very similar to the Dresden Dolls and Katzenjammer Kabarett. An 18 city West Coast and East Coast tour wan through September and October 2004, with the band lineup of Rosenthal, Helm, Grant, Nicki Jaine, and Jay.

Rosenthal and Jaine (vocals and guitar) spent 2005 recording and performing as Revue Noir.

Black Tape for a Blue Girl performed three shows in 2007 with the lineup of Rosenthal, Grant, Helm and Feuer.

=== Athan Maroulis era (2009–2012) ===
Athan Maroulis, who appeared on two songs on The Scavenger Bride album, as well as a cover of Dead Can Dance's "Fortune Presents Gifts Not According to the Book", took over as lead vocalist.

On September 22, 2009, the band released their 10th album, 10 Neurotics, with the lineup of Rosenthal on acoustic guitar, programming and keyboards, Brian Viglione (The Dresden Dolls) on drums, percussion, bass and guitar, and vocalists Maroulis (Spahn Ranch), Laurie Reade (ex-Attrition) and Nicki Jaine on additional vocals. Sam explained that the risque nature of the Neurotics-material caused the previous band members to shy away from singing the songs, though Grant did appear on the song "You Strike Me Down", previously released in a longer and more ethereal form on Projekt200.

In August 2009, the band was invited to play at a CD release party for Dreamchild's Sleeping Flowers Severed, Scream of Laughter. Wisteriax performed an opening cello piece, Black Tape for a Blue Girl performed a four-song set from 10 Neurotics, and Dreamchild finished with a final set. The band played East Coast shows and festivals with Rosenthal, Maroulis, Jaine and occasionally Viglione (on guitar).

In October 2010, Valerie Gentile (The Crüxshadows) joined Black Tape for a Blue Girl as guitarist and vocalist, replacing Jaine, who retired from music at this point.

In October 2011, Pinky Weitzman (Not Waving But Drowning) replaced vocalist Valerie Gentile, who was living in Los Angeles. Maroulis, Rosenthal and Weitzman performed three shows together, including the 2011 Projektfest.

With Maroulis as vocalist, Black Tape For A Blue Girl played 31 shows between August 2009 and November 2011. In mid-2011, Rosenthal and Maroulis, with guest cellist Erica Mulkey / Unwoman, recorded a cover of the 1983 David Sylvian / Ryuichi Sakamoto track "Forbidden Colours" which appeared on the Projekt Holiday release Ornamental.

The band then entered a mostly dormant phase while Rosenthal wrote (in 2012) and promoted his erotic novel, Rye.

=== Post-NYC era (2013–present) ===
In August 2013, Rosenthal moved to Portland, Oregon. His endorsement of crowd-funding grew after the successful 2013 Kickstarter for the vinyl reissue of Remnants of a Deeper Purity. In the same year, they released Tenderotics - a reworking of the tracks from 2009's 10 Neurotics.

In January 2015, Rosenthal launched a Patreon page to support the recording of new music. In April 2015, the first result of this Patron support was As Lonely As Dave Bowman's Monolith CD, a solo-electronic release from Rosenthal. In September 2015, a Kickstarter was created to fund a 12" single with four new tracks, all sung by Michael Plaster of SoulWhirlingSomewhere.

Rosenthal wrote, "The tracks on the EP are a bit of an anomaly from the others I am recording; these are sparse and sensitive acoustic guitar pieces with Michael's vocals." At this time, he announced the name and stylistic change of the spring 2016 Black Tape For A Blue Girl album, "These fleeting moments will be a return to the ethereal darkwave/dark ambient sound of the early 90s Blacktape CDs."

The band marked their 30th anniversary with the release of These Fleeting Moments, featuring the return of original vocalist Oscar Herrera after 17 years absence from the music scene.

The band's have since released two further Kickstarter-funded albums, their 12th, To Touch the Milky Way, was released in 2018, followed by The Cleft Serpent in 2021.

== Musical style ==
The band's style is considered by AllMusic to represent the ethereal wave and dark wave musical styles. They are also known to perform within the neo-classical, gothic rock, dark caberet, folk, ambient music, minimal music and art pop styles. The lyric writing is done by Rosenthal and often explores powerful emotions of love, vulnerability, seclusion, grief, jealousy, and passion.

== Notable past members ==
Past members include Elysabeth Grant (also of Rachael's Surrender) on vocals and violin, Bret Helm (of Audra) on vocals, acoustic guitar and bass, Lisa Feuer on flute and vocals and Michael Laird (of Unto Ashes) on acoustic guitar, percussion and vocals. A notable former member is the long-time vocalist Oscar Herrera (of the 1980s Florida-based The Sleep of Reason), who performed on the band's first seven albums and their 11th album, These Fleeting Moments.

== Discography ==
=== Studio albums ===
Date of US release	Title	Label
1986	The Rope	Projekt
1987	Mesmerized by the Sirens	Projekt
1989	Ashes in the Brittle Air	Projekt
1991	A Chaos of Desire	Projekt
1993	This Lush Garden Within	Projekt
1996 2006; 2016	Remnants of a Deeper Purity Remnants of a Deeper Purity - 10th Anniversary 2-CD Edition; Remnants of a Deeper Purity - 20th Anniversary 2-CD Edition	Projekt
1999	As One Aflame Laid Bare by Desire	Projekt (USA) / Trisol Records (Europe)
2002	The Scavenger Bride	Projekt
2004	Halo Star	Projekt
2009	10 Neurotics	Projekt (USA) / Trisol Records (Europe)
2013	Tenderotics	Projekt
2016	These Fleeting Moments	Projekt
2018	To Touch the Milky Way	Projekt
2021	The Cleft Serpent	Projekt

=== Maxi-CDs and singles ===
Date of US release	Title	Label
1996	The First Pain to Linger	Projekt
1997	With My Sorrows	Projekt
1998	The Aflame EP	Projekt
2004	"The Scarecrow" (CD single)	Projekt
2004	"Tarnished" (CD single)	Projekt
2009	Quadranotics (EP)	Projekt
