= Unto Ashes =

- Origin: United States
- Genres: Neofolk, neoclassical darkwave
- Years active: 1997–present
- Label: Projekt
- Members: Michael Laird; Natalia Lincoln; Ericah Hagle
- Website: https://www.untoashes.com/

Unto Ashes is an American musical ensemble based in New York City whose neofolk and neoclassical darkwave style incorporates madrigal, folk, and elements of neo-medieval and darkwave. Founded by Michael Laird and Susanna Melendez in 1997, the band has released twelve full-length CDs on the Projekt label (all recorded and produced by Laird). Previous members and contributors have included Kit Messick, Melody Henry, Spider Grandmother (pseudonym), Jeremy Bastard (pseudonym). The band has continued to collaborate with Paul Ash, Catherine Bent, Sonne Hagal, and Bret Helm from Audra (band). Singer Mariko a.k.a. Sarah Newman left the band in 2008 to work with the German Qntal project and related ensembles.

The band has performed at the Wave-Gotik-Treffen Leipzig on four occasions: 2004, 2009, 2015, and 2019.

In 2006, the band toured Europe with Qntal. For the 2019 WGT concert, the band performed with Michael Popp, founding member of Qntal, at the Schauspielhaus Leipzig.

== Discography ==
=== Albums ===
- Moon Oppose Moon (1999 · Projekt [USA])
- Saturn Return (2001 · Projekt [USA])
- Empty Into White (2003 · Projekt [USA] / Kalinkaland [Germany])
- I Cover You With Blood (EP) (2003 · Projekt [USA] / Kalinkaland [Germany])
- Grave Blessings (2005 · Projekt [USA] / Kalinkaland [Germany])
- Songs For A Widow (2006 · Projekt [USA] / Pandaimonium [Germany])
- The Blood Of My Lady (2009 · Projekt [USA])
- Spellbound in Winter (2012 · Projekt [USA])
- Burials Foretold (2012 · Projekt [USA])
- Ghosts Captured (2014 · Projekt [USA])
- Pretty Haunted Things (2019 · Projekt [USA])
- Orchids Grew Here (2023 · Projekt [USA])

=== Videos ===
- Palestinalied (2004)
