= An April March =

Canadian alternative rock band

- Origin: Toronto, Ontario, Canada
- Genres: Alternative rock, shoegazing, ethereal, dream pop
- Years active: 1989–1999
- Labels: Bedazzled Records, Cartwheel Productions
- Past members: Danella Hocevar; Chris Perry; Michael Klüg; Robert Lambke; Joel Walsh; Derek Millar; Andrew Starling

An April March was a Canadian alternative rock band formed in Kitchener, Ontario, in 1989. The band's last incarnation consisted of singer/guitarist Danella Hocevar, guitarist Chris Perry and drummer Michael Klüg. The band "An April March" is not to be confused with April March, or Russian and French bands called by similar names.

== History ==
The band members met in 1989 in Kitchener, Ontario, called themselves The Whittingtons and self-released a demo cassette. After Hocevar and Perry moved to Toronto, the band changed its name to An April March and began recording and performing in Toronto. Their stylistic influences include dream pop, shoegazing, ethereal and ambient. The earliest lineup under the new name was Hocevar and Perry, with Bob Lambke on bass and Joel Walsh on drums.

An April March independently produced two EPs: Memory Gardens (1990), and Scarlett Bliss (1991). Also in 1991, they contributed the song, "Jade", to the A Giant Leap Of Faith Volume Two compilation album released on vinyl and produced by University of Waterloo's CKMS-FM station manager Bill Wharrie.

In 1993, the band signed with the Washington, DC–based label Bedazzled Records and released their first full-length album, Impatiens. That was followed by the EP Instruments of Lust and Fury (1995), the album Lessons in Vengeance (1995), and the EP Adagio (1996). They released their last album, It Goes Without Saying, in 1997. A final EP, Something Once True Is Always True..., was released in 1999.

The group broke up in 1999, playing their last show on 29 April of that year.

An April March songs appeared on numerous compilation albums and they recorded songs for tribute albums to the Cocteau Twins and The Pixies. They released two videos: "Lava" and "Scarlet Bliss".

An April March disbanded in 1999 but their impact was acknowledged over 17 years later when "Memory" was chosen to appear on Still in a Dream: A Story of Shoegaze 1988–1995 (Cherry Red Records). In 2022, "All the Flowery" was chosen to appear on the boxed set Cherry Stars Collide - Dream Pop, Shoegaze and Ethereal Rock 1986–1995 (Cherry Red Records).

== Discography ==
Albums

- Impatiens (1993), Cartwheel Productions
- Lessons in Vengeance (1995), Bedazzled Records
- It Goes Without Saying (1997), Bedazzled Records

EPs

- Memory Gardens (1990), Independent
- Scarlett Bliss (1991), Independent
- Instruments of Lust and Fury (1995), Bedazzled Records
- Adagio (1996), Bedazzled Records
- Something Once True Is Always True... (1999), Bedazzled Records

Singles

- "The Last of Ariadne" / "No Answer" (1992), Apostrophe Records/Cartwheel Productions, 1992 (split 7-inch with the Curtain Society
- "Lava" / "Gates Within Us" (1994), Bedazzled Records

Compilation Inclusions

- A Giant Leap Of Faith Volume Two (1991), Sleet Records. Song: "Jade"
- Anon (1993), Castle von Buhler. Song "Ceiling"
- Woke Up Smiling (1995), Bedazzled Records. Song: "Delirium"
- Radio Hepcats (1996), Antarctic Press.Song: "The Red Dots"
- Alleviation (1996), Silber Records. Song: "Avidbake"
- Xmas 97 (1997), Bedazzled Records. Songs: "Scarlet Bliss", "Lava", and "Waltz of the Flowers", vs. Pi Tchaikovsky
- Losing Today Volume I (1998), Losing Today Records. Song: "Let Everyone Down"
- News From Nowhere (1998), Plan 11 Records. Song: "Daylight Falters"
- Pixies Fuckin' Die! (A Tribute) (1999), Lifelike Records, The Orchard. Song: "Alex Eiffel"
- Half-Gifts: A Tribute To The Cocteau Twins (2002), Dewdrops Records. Song: "Pink Orange Red"
- "Memory", Still in a Dream: A Story of Shoegaze 1988–1995 (2016), Cherry Red Records
- "All the Flowery" Cherry Stars Collide - Dream Pop, Shoegaze and Ethereal Rock 1986–1995 (2022), Cherry Red Records

== See also ==
- Shoegazing
- List of shoegazing musicians
- Dream pop
- Alternative rock
