= Faith & Disease =

US musical group

- Origin: Seattle, Washington, United States
- Genres: Dark wave, indie rock, slowcore, shoegazing, dream pop, folk, new age, ethereal wave
- Years active: 1994-2006
- Labels: Ivy Records; Projekt Records; Amplexus Records (Italy)
- Members: Dara Rosenwasser; Eric Cooley
- Past members: Steven Knouse, Richard Allen (Hare), Barry Semple, Joshua Furman, Greg Forschler, Joaquin Tavares, Charlotte Sather, Nancy Warton, John Clough, Patrick Hogan, Bradley Haug, and several other contributing members (Suzanne Allee, Jesse Sykes, Robert Mackusick, Daniel O'Malley, Mary Brommel, Marlo Ann Kraus, and Anna Kemnitz (Semple))
- Website: Faith & Disease FB page

Faith & Disease was a Seattle-based ethereal wave music project who released their debut CD "Beauty and Bitterness" in 1994. Its core members are Eric Cooley (guitar/bass, songwriter, producer) and Dara Rosenwasser (vocalist, lyricist, co-writer).

== Biography ==
The band was originally signed to Seattle indie label Ivy Records and more recently Projekt Records. They have released six full-length albums and dozens of compilation appearances including an EP with electronic artist Jeff Greinke Dream The Red Clouds released on Italian label Amplexus Records to their credit. Faith & Disease (aka Faith and Disease) played 300+ live shows during their time, including appearances at Bumbershoot, Folklife, headlining at the Convergence festival, NXNW, and an invite to the 1999 CMJ Music Festival, and extensive tours of the US in 1998, 1999 and 2001. And a final Western US Tour in support of their 2003 release Passport to Kunming. They played their two final shows at Experience Music Project in Seattle, WA, in 2005 and then on March 23, 2006, at Seattle's Neumos. No reunion plans have been set.

== Discography ==
=== Studio albums ===
- Beauty and Bitterness (Ivy Records, 1994)
- Fortune His Sleep (Ivy Records, 1995)
- Livesongs: Third Body (Ivy Records, 1995)
- Insularia (Ivy Records, 1998)
- Lamentations: A Collection (Ivy Records, 1999)
- Beneath the Trees (Projekt Records, 2000)
- Dream The Red Clouds (Amplexus Records, 2002)
- Passport to Kunming (Projekt Records, 2003)
