= Convergence (goth festival) =

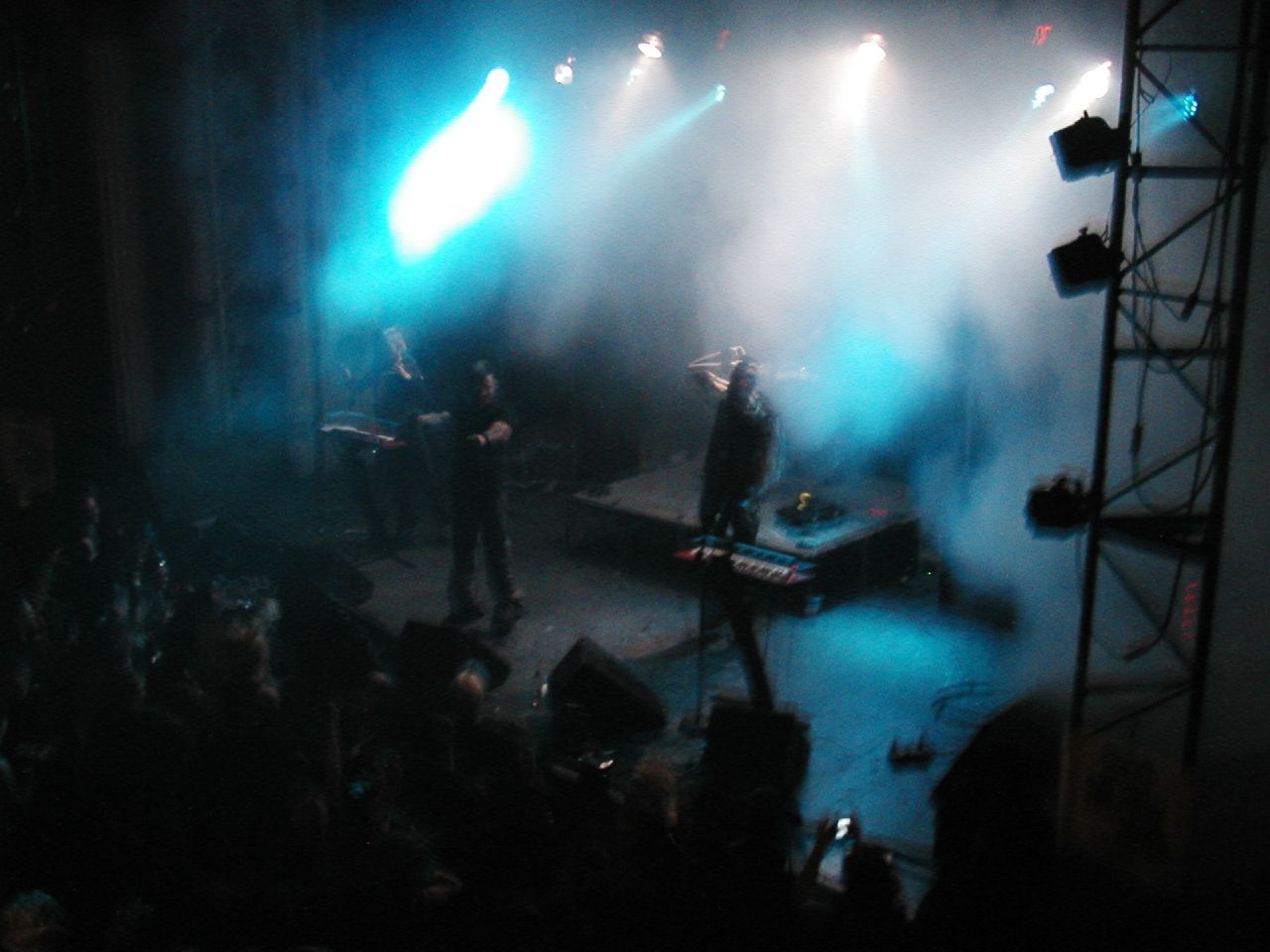
- Status: Active
- Genre: Goth
- Location: North America
- Inaugurated: 1995
- Most recent: 2025
- Website: http://www.altgothic.com/

Convergence (sometimes referenced as C*) is the annual net.goth party run by and for members of the alt.gothic and alt.gothic.fashion newsgroup, and other related Usenet newsgroups. Started in 1995, it is a chance for net.goths and others who normally only meet on the Internet to meet. Events at Convergence typically included live bands and club nights, bazaars, fashion, art shows, panels, and tours of goth-themed locales in the host city.

== Location ==
Convergence is a "floating" event. The location for each year voted on by the net.goth community in response to proposals by volunteer committees. So far all have taken place in North America.

Past Convergences have been held in:

- Convergence 1 (June 23–24, 1995): Chicago, Illinois
- Convergence 2 (August 9–11, 1996): Boston, Massachusetts
- Convergence 3 (August 1–3, 1997): San Francisco, California
- Convergence 4 (August 21–23, 1998): Toronto, Ontario
- Convergence 5 (April 2–4, 1999): New Orleans, Louisiana
- Convergence 6 (May 26–29, 2000): Seattle, Washington
- Convergence 7 (August 17–19, 2001): New York City, New York
- Convergence 8 (May 31 – June 2, 2002): Montreal, Quebec
- Convergence 9 (April 25–27, 2003): Las Vegas, Nevada
- Convergence 10 (May 7–9, 2004): Chicago, Illinois
- Convergence 11 (April 22–25, 2005): San Diego, California
- Convergence 12 (April 13–16, 2006): New Orleans, Louisiana
- Convergence 13 (May 25–27, 2007): Portland, Oregon
- Convergence 14 (August 8–11, 2008): Ybor City (Tampa, Florida)
- Convergence 15 (July 17–20, 2009): Long Beach, California
- Convergence 16 (August 13–16, 2010): Park City, Utah
- Convergence 17 (June 24–26, 2011): Cozumel, Mexico
- Convergence 18 (June 15–17, 2012): Buffalo, New York
- Convergence 19 (April 18–22, 2013): Austin, Texas
- Convergence 20 (April 25–27, 2014): Chicago, Illinois
- Convergence 21 (May 1–3, 2015): Hollywood, California
- Convergence 22 (March 25–27, 2016): New Orleans, Louisiana
- Convergence 23 (May 19–21, 2017): Dallas, Texas
- Convergence 24 (April 27–29, 2018): Detroit, Michigan
- Convergence 25 (May 3–5, 2019): Boston, Massachusetts

== Attendance ==
Convergence was initially proposed and planned by two long-time members of the alt.gothic newsgroup hierarchy, at the time residents of Chicago, as an international gathering of members of the newsgroups and related net.goth groups. It was conceived as an opportunity for those who had previously known each other primarily or exclusively through Internet forums, to meet and get to know each other in person.

There has been considerable debate regarding the extent to which the event should reach out to other on-line gothic communities, as well as members of local non-Internet-based gothic scenes. Some planning committees have made efforts to expand the scope of the event; while others have made similar efforts to restrict advertising to predominantly the founding net.goth communities.

Attendance ranged over the years usually between 300-800, but attendance spiked at Convergence 13 to approximately 1,500.

== Organization ==
There is no formal Convergence organization per se. Since shortly after its inception, the bidding and voting process has been managed by a more-or-less consistent group of volunteers, known informally as the C*b*l, composed of several of the longest-term participants in the alt.gothic newsgroups. The C*b*l is widely recognized as having made some of the most substantial contributions to maintaining Convergence, and are among its most frequent attendees. The group also maintains the official Convergence website, and provides organizational and informational assistance to host committees.

Each Convergence is organized and run by an ad hoc volunteer committee. Committees typically consist of residents of the host city, a large percentage of whom are expected to be active participants on alt.gothic or related net.goth groups.

== See also ==
- List of electronic music festivals
- List of gothic festivals
