= Mike VanPortfleet =

- Born: Robert Michael VanPortfleet; Grand Rapids, Michigan, United States
- Genres: Darkwave, gothic rock
- Occupation: Musician
- Instruments: Synthesizer, keyboards, guitar
- Years active: 1988 – present
- Label: Projekt
- Member of: Lycia

Robert Michael “Mike” VanPortfleet is an American singer-songwriter and keyboard player, most recognized for founding the darkwave group Lycia in 1988. During the 2000s, his focus shifted from Lycia to several other musical projects which included his debut solo work, Beyond the Horizon Line.

== History ==
Mike VanPortfleet was born in Grand Rapids, Michigan in the early 1960s. In 1978, he moved to Tempe, Arizona, where he studied and graduated with a degree in cultural geography. Soon afterward he picked up the guitar and played with several unsuccessful bands, most of whom were notorious at local venues for their drunken behavior. After nearly abandoning his musical interests and returning to school, VanPortfleet learned about 4-track recording and decided to try his hand at composing and producing music himself. In May 1988, Mike began the musical project Lycia under which he recorded mostly guitar experiments. He enlisted bassist John Fair and together they produced over a hundred songs within a matter of months. In March 1989, VanPortfleet released some of the music from these sessions under the name Lycia on Wake, a 6-song demo tape released through Orphanage Records.

== Discography ==
Solo

- Beyond the Horizon Line (Silber, 2004)

Lycia

- Wake (Orphanage, 1989)
- Ionia (Projekt, 1991)
- A Day in the Stark Corner (Projekt, 1993)
- The Burning Circle and Then Dust (Projekt, 1995)
- Cold (Projekt, 1997)
- Estrella (Projekt, 1998)
- Tripping Back Into the Broken Days (Projekt, 2002)
- Empty Space (Silber, 2003)
- Quiet Moments (Handmade Birds, 2013)
- A Line That Connects (Handmade Birds, 2015)
- In Flickers (Lycium Music, 2018)

Bleak

- Vane (Projekt, 1995)

Estraya

- The Time Has Come and Gone (Reptilian, 2000)
