= Lycia (band) =

American dark wave band

- Origin: Tempe, Arizona, United States
- Genres: Darkwave, ethereal wave, gothic rock, dream pop, shoegaze
- Years active: 1988–present
- Labels: Lycium Music, Silber Records, Projekt Records
- Members: Mike VanPortfleet; David Galas; Tara VanFlower; John Fair
- Past members: Will Welch
- Website: www.lyciummusic.com

Lycia is an American darkwave band formed in 1988 in Tempe, Arizona. The main personnel of the band are Mike VanPortfleet, Tara VanFlower and David Galas. Although only achieving minor cult success, the band is notable for being one of the ground breaking groups in darkwave and ethereal wave styles. Their 1995 album The Burning Circle and Then Dust received some attention for the power pop hit song "Pray" and "remains a high point of American dark rock", according to AllMusic. Lycia's music is characterized by rich soundscapes and layers of echoed guitars, dark and ethereal keyboards, doomy drum machine beats, VanPortfleet's melancholic, whispered vocals and Vanflower's vivid voice. Peter Steele from Type O Negative hailed Lycia as ‘the most depressing thing I’ve ever heard in my life’.

== History ==
After Mike VanPortfleet started Lycia in 1988 as a solo project, in the summer of that year he met Will Welch, who joined for the project. In November, Welch was replaced by John Fair. In March 1989, Lycia's first recording, Wake, a 6-song demo tape, is released on Orphanage Records. The sound is characterized at the time by dominating rock guitars and rhythm patterns of drum computer. Wake was unique in that it was mastered directly onto an audio cassette tape, as opposed to the more professional multitrack recording that Lycia would henceforth use.

John Fair left Lycia in 1990, and Will Welch returned. The sound of Lycia increasingly evolved into a heavy-noise or harsh industrial direction. At the end of that year, Lycia began work on the first full-length album entitled "Byzantine", but due to technical problems it never appeared. Mike VanPortfleet decided to gather the individual fragments of the album for a second start-up process. The final outcome was in September 1991 under the title Ionia on the label Projekt Records and is characterized by ambient textures and very flat and atmospheric sounds.

Meanwhile, production on the next album, A Day in the Stark Corner, was already in full swing. This was published in June 1993 and follows technically seamlessly as the successor to Ionia. A short California tour followed. Soon it turned the occupation and the sound again. The line-up was extended by David Galas. Under the project name Bleak, they began work on the album Vane, but in a much more rough direction. In return, in the main project Lycia, new tracks were prepared, increasingly emphasizing on acoustic guitars. The line-up was reinforced by the singer Tara VanFlower, and this material was released in 1995 as a double CD under the name The Burning Circle and Then Dust. The album introduced the power pop hit "Pray". Following the release, Lycia played concerts opening for Type O Negative. In June 1995, Lycia traveled to Chicago, IL, to perform in the first gothic Convergence festival.

It was followed by Cold in 1996, representing the group's bleakest sounds yet, another landmark in the darkwave genre. 1998's Estrella saw a more experimental output with otherworldly sounds. In 1999 they started their own label called Lycium Music. Under the title "Estraya" was released an EP titled The Time Has Come and Gone with songs based on ambient soundscapes and acoustic guitars. With the same sound approach, but under the name of the main project Lycia, in 2002 they released the album Tripping Back Into The Broken Days. The same year some songs from Cold were licensed for the film titled Lana's Rain. In January 2001 the band's former label, Projekt Records, released Compilation Appearances Vol. 1, and Compilation Appearances Vol. 2 in July 2001, without Lycia's involvement, featuring songs recorded in Arizona during the early 1990s.

In October 2003, two months later, Lycia quit their label Projekt Records, and their last album titled Empty Space was released on Silber Records. VanPortfleet released his first solo work in 2004, an ambient album entitled Beyond The Horizon Line. Tara VanFlower (now married to Mike VanPortfleet) and David Galas have also since recorded their own solo releases. Vanflower recorded This Womb Like Liquid Honey, My Little Fire-Filled Heart, and has performed two solo live shows, including the Cornerstone Festival in Illinois. David Galas released "The Cataclysm" in 2006, "The Happiest Days Of My Life" in 2009 and "The Ghosts Of California" in 2011. After several years of inactivity, Lycia announced on their Facebook and MySpace pages a digital-only release titled Fifth Sun, released on June 22, 2010.

On December 5, 2012, Lycia announced a new release, Quiet Moments, through their Facebook page. It was released on August 20, 2013.

On October 26, 2014, Lycia announced that David Galas had rejoined the band and that they were recording a new album titled A Line That Connects, scheduled to be released in August 2015.

On November 9, 2018, Lycia released their full-length LP In Flickers on Projekt Records. It is available at the Projekt Records site.

== Musical style ==
Lycia have been recognized as pioneers in darkwave music. Over the band's career they have also incorporated elements of post-punk, ethereal wave, ambient, industrial, and electronic music. In a review for Pitchfork, Andy O'Conner describes Quiet Moments as "a somber, but beautiful collection that offers an intriguing meditation on mystery and loss". Author Eugene Thacker, in an interview with Lycia, describes their music: "This is dark music is at once wide open and closed in upon itself, a wall of sound that disintegrates into an ambient haze of lethargic rhythms and world-weary chord changes."

== Discography ==
Studio albums

- Wake (1989)
- Ionia (1991) (According to their Bandcamp page, the album will be re-release as a 2 LP set for its 30th anniversary)
- A Day in the Stark Corner (1993)
- The Burning Circle and Then Dust (1995) (Remastered in 2006 as a single-disc edition)
- Cold (1996) (Remastered in 2007)
- Estrella (1998) (Remastered in 2005)
- Tripping Back Into the Broken Days (2002)
- Empty Space (2003)
- Quiet Moments (2013)
- A Line That Connects (2015)
- In Flickers (2018)

Live performance albums

- Live (1994)

Compilation albums

- Compilation Appearances Vol. 1 (2001)
- Compilation Appearances Vol. 2 (2001)

Extended plays

- The Time Has Come and Gone (2000) (Released under Estraya)
- Fifth Sun (2010)
- Casa Luna (2021)

Other albums

- Vane (1995) (Released under Bleak)
