= Tara VanFlower =

American singer-songwriter

- Born: Tara L. VanPortfleet; April 15, 1971 (age 55); Mesa, Arizona, United States
- Genres: Darkwave, goth rock
- Occupation: Musician
- Instrument: Vocals
- Years active: 1988-present
- Label: Projekt
- Member of: Lycia

Tara L. VanPortfleet, known professionally as Tara VanFlower, is an American singer-songwriter, known for her vocal contributions to darkwave group Lycia. In 1999 she released This Womb Like Liquid Honey on Projekt Records. She released a second album titled My Little Fire-Filled Heart in 2005 by Silber Records.

== Discography ==
=== Studio albums ===
- This Womb Like Liquid Honey (1999)
- My Little Fire-Filled Heart (2005)

=== Extended plays ===
- Beneath the Moon (2006)
