= Sam Rosenthal =

American electronic musician

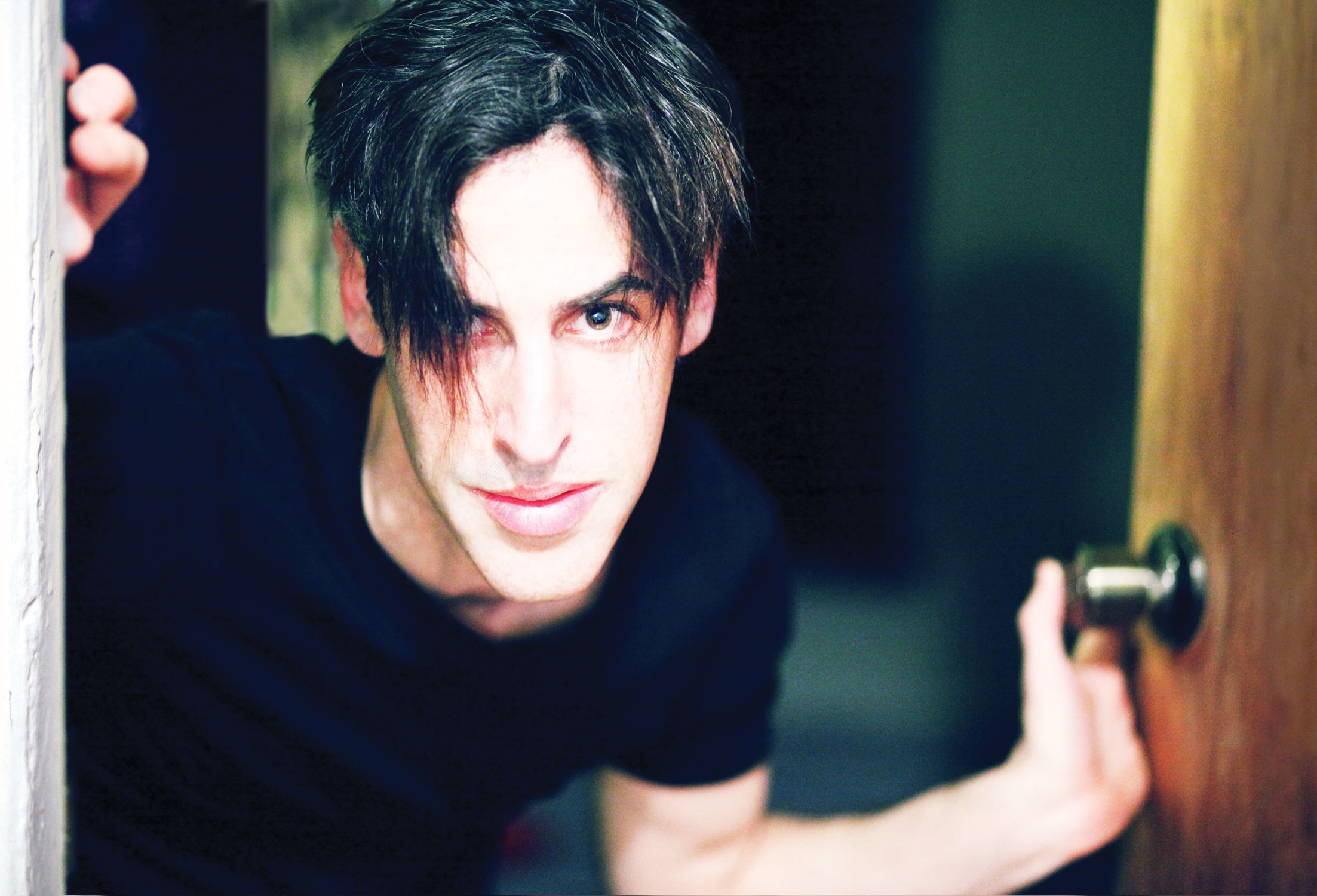
- Rosenthal (founder of Projekt Records and Black Tape for a Blue Girl).
- Occupation: Musician
- Organization: Projekt Records

Sam Rosenthal is an American musician, composer, artist, and novelist. He is the founder and leader of the band Black Tape for a Blue Girl and the Projekt Records record label. He lives in Portland, Oregon with his son and cat. Rosenthal was interviewed in August 2016 for an NPR piece about the DMCA. "It's a really unreasonable expectation," he says, "that I would have the time to chase (illegal downloads) all day when I should be running a business and making music."

== Projekt Records ==
Begun by Rosenthal in 1983 as a way to release his own solo electronic music, Projekt Records spent its first three years as a cassette-only label with a series of titles that are now long out-of-print. While most of the cassettes were solo electronic music from Rosenthal, a few were compilations of Florida-based electronic artists.

In 1985, Projekt released its first vinyl, Tanzmusik by Rosenthal. The second vinyl release Black Tape For a Blue Girl's The Rope came in the summer of 1986.

In 1989, Projekt released its first compact disc, Black Tape For a Blue Girl's Ashes in the Brittle Air. Although the label began as a way to release his own art, Rosenthal began to see his label taking shape as a vehicle for exposing other artists whose passionate work impressed him. His first discovery was Arizona's Lycia, which signed with Projekt in 1990. Soon thereafter, Rosenthal was impressed with other young bands, Love Spirals Downwards, Soul Whirling Somewhere, and Lovesliescrushing whose debut releases soon followed.

In 1993, Rosenthal began Projekt: Darkwave, a mail-order company that carried the music of Projekt as well as labels with a similar outlook, including Santa Barbara's Tess Records, Germany's Hyperium Records, and Sweden's Cold Meat Industry.

Moving to Chicago in 1996, Rosenthal's label grew in both number of releases and number of employees. Now with full-time marketing, distribution and promotion managers, Projekt became better able to meet the challenge of making people aware of the label. In 1996 Projekt celebrated their success by staging a two-day Projekt Festival at the historic Vic Theatre in Chicago, with over 1000 people in attendance.

After many years of struggling with self-distribution, in 1997, Projekt secured exclusive distribution in The US with Ryko Distribution. Distribution was handled through Ryko and ADA (Alternative Distribution Alliance) throughout most of the 2000s and, as of 2020, is handled by MNRK Music Group.

In late 1999, Rosenthal moved to New York City, and Projekt was located in Brooklyn. In 2013, he relocated to Portland, Oregon. The label had many employees over the years who assisted Rosenthal with his vision. Most notably, Shea Hovey is the current assistant who handles the press contacts as well as the mail-order. She has been with the label since 2000 and is often the face of Projekt at festivals.

== Alternative Rhythms ==
From April 1981 to Summer 1986, Rosenthal was the editor of a fanzine, Alternative Rhythms. Originally based in South Florida, it eventually was distributed throughout Florida and into Athens and Atlanta Georgia. Circulation peaked at 14,000. The most controversial issue featured the band Gay Cowboys in Bondage on the cover. Interviews with Robert Fripp, Frank Zappa, REM and New Order were included, as well as local artists Charlie Pickett & the Eggs, the Chant, the Spanish Dogs and a short show review for Johnny Depp's band, The Kids.

About the fanzine name, Rosenthal said: "'Alternative' wasn't used at that time (1982-1986ish) for this genre of music. I came up with the name by jamming together parts of two titles from bands I was into: 'Obscure Alternatives' by Japan and 'Dangerous Rhythm' by Ultravox! Then, years later, people started using 'Alternative' for what we used to call underground or indie.

== Black Tape for a Blue Girl ==
Started in 1986 after a move to California, Black Tape for a Blue Girl serves as a vehicle for Rosenthal's musical vision. Its signature combination of gothic, ethereal, ambient and neo-classical elements has explored existential themes of loves lost and passions yet to come. In the years that followed, his music has grown into a full-fledged band, whose members revolve around Rosenthal's subtle electronic foundation. Current line-up includes Rosenthal as songwriter and keyboardist, cellist Henrik Meierkord and vocalist Jon DeRosa (of Aarktica).

On August 12, 2016, the band released their 11th studio album entitled These Fleeting Moments on Metropolis Records.

On October 1, 2021, the band released their 13th studio album entitled "The Cleft Serpent"

== Novelist ==
In 1996, Rosenthal released his debut novel, The First Pain to Linger, which sold 10,000 self-released copies. In 2011, Rosenthal began work on his second book, Rye, an erotic novel that was published in November 2012. One of Rosenthal's stories appears in The First Time I Heard the Smiths, released August 2012.
