= Ethereal wave =

Music genre

- Other names: Ethereal goth; ethereal darkwave; ethereal
- Stylistic origins: Dark wave; gothic rock; post-punk; new wave
- Cultural origins: Early 1980s, United Kingdom
- Typical instruments: Vocals; guitar; bass; drums; drum machine; synthesizer
- Derivative forms: Dream pop; shoegaze

Other topics
- Cold wave; neoclassical dark wave

Ethereal wave, also called ethereal darkwave, ethereal goth or simply ethereal, is a subgenre of dark wave music that is variously described as "gothic", "romantic", and "otherworldly". It developed in the early 1980s in the United Kingdom as an outgrowth of gothic rock, and was mainly represented by 4AD bands such as Cocteau Twins, This Mortal Coil, and early guitar-driven Dead Can Dance.

In the second half of the 1980s, the genre continued to develop in the United States and was primarily associated with C'est La Mort Records, which featured artists such as Area (later the Moon Seven Times) and Heavenly Bodies, a band formed by ex-members of Dead Can Dance and This Mortal Coil, as well as with Projekt Records, which featured groups like Black Tape for a Blue Girl, Love Spirals Downwards and Lycia.

Ethereal wave, especially the music of Cocteau Twins, was one of the key inspirations for the British dream pop/shoegaze scene of the late 1980s and early 1990s.

== Etymology ==
In the mid-1980s, several Cocteau Twins/This Mortal Coil records were described as "ethereal", "etherealism", and "ethereal romanticism". In September 1988, Staci Bonner of Reflex magazine described the music of British label 4AD as "gothically ethereal". Print media in the US, such as Alternative Press, Billboard, and Option music magazine, started using the term "ethereal goth" more frequently, whereas European music magazines, primarily German zines such as Glasnost, Aeterna, Entry, Black, and Astan, had named the genre "ethereal wave" in the same vein as new wave, dark wave, and cold wave.

Historically, the term was mostly applied to the roster of 4AD label − not only referring to music, but also regarding aesthetics of the graphical visualization.

The "ethereal" designation has been taken over by authors such as Mick Mercer and Dave Thompson to delineate the same musical phenomenon in their books, while Simon Reynolds began using the term "goth-lite" (or "post-goth", a term he coined in 1987) to describe the music of Cocteau Twins, Dead Can Dance, and related 4AD artists.

"Goth-lite" first appeared in 1995 in magazines such as CMJ New Music Monthly (Douglas Wolk) and SPIN (Jody Press) as a retroactive description of Siouxsie and the Banshees' Tinderbox album, which heavily relies on the use of guitar pedals and studio effects in songs such as "92 Degrees" and "Land's End".

== Style characteristics ==
Trance to the Sun - Horse Head Lake
The clip illustrates a hard variant of the genre, based on a drumcomputer and swirling guitar patterns, comparable to the early music of the Cocteau Twins.

Audio clip collection (4 different bands)
4 track samples in waltz time signature, published by Cocteau Twins, Speaking Silence, Opium Den, and Mistle Thrush.

The defining characteristic of the style is the use of effects-laden guitar soundscapes, primarily based on minor key tonality (which unfolds a serious, dark and wistful atmosphere), frequently post-punk-oriented bass lines, restrained tempo (ranging from down- to midtempo) and high register female vocals (sometimes operatic and with hard-to-decipher lyrical content), often closely intertwined with romantic aesthetics and pre-Raphaelite imagery.

Another significant feature is the extensive use of drum machines, typical of many 4AD productions and initially established by Cocteau Twins' Garlands album and the first full-length work of Dead Can Dance. Acoustic guitars, often combined with electric guitars and bass guitars, are sometimes used to create a more folk-oriented feel (e.g. Love Spirals Downwards).

Aside from the genre's post-punk and gothic rock roots, some ethereal bands, namely Lycia and Soul Whirling Somewhere, were equally influenced by ambient and soundtrack-oriented music and/or by more traditional progressive rock textures.

== History ==
=== 1980s: roots and initiators ===
The late 1970s to early 1980s was a period in which some musicians after punk rock explored musical paths interchangeably described as post-punk and new wave. Technical improvement and the rise of affordable equipment such as drum machines and synthesizers "helped give birth to Goth". Seminal music artists such as the Cure, Siouxsie and the Banshees, New Order, and Cocteau Twins − who were able to expand and refine their style over the years − began to emerge from the darker strands of post-punk (see dark wave and gothic rock), and tended to "became more ethereal in the process." Most of those bands, especially Siouxsie and the Banshees, are often credited with building the fertile ground for a subsequent generation of ethereal wave performers (e.g. This Ascension). Hits like "Melt", released in 1982, rely on a 3/4 time signature and an extensive use of digital delay, reverberation and modulation effects, accompanied by dark, unsettling lyrics, and have been described as languorous, seductive, and erotic.

During this time, ethereal was not solidified as a genre on its own until the appearance of the Cocteau Twins and their widely cited early works Head over Heels and Treasure, which set the blueprint for a separate style in music. Peter Buckley wrote, "The band began to ditch the spikiness of Garlands, as Robin Guthrie developed a lush cascading guitar technique, creating a rich texture and an otherworldly feel ... From this point on, music journalists found it impossible to describe the band's work without resorting to the word 'Ethereal'", while according to Rick Poynor, "... it was the Cocteau Twins, whose debut album, "Garlands", appeared on 4AD in 1982, who proved to be the label's first major artists and did much to crystallize 4AD's image in its early years as an other-worldly purveyor of Ethereal music by reclusive groups who preferred the shadows to the light."

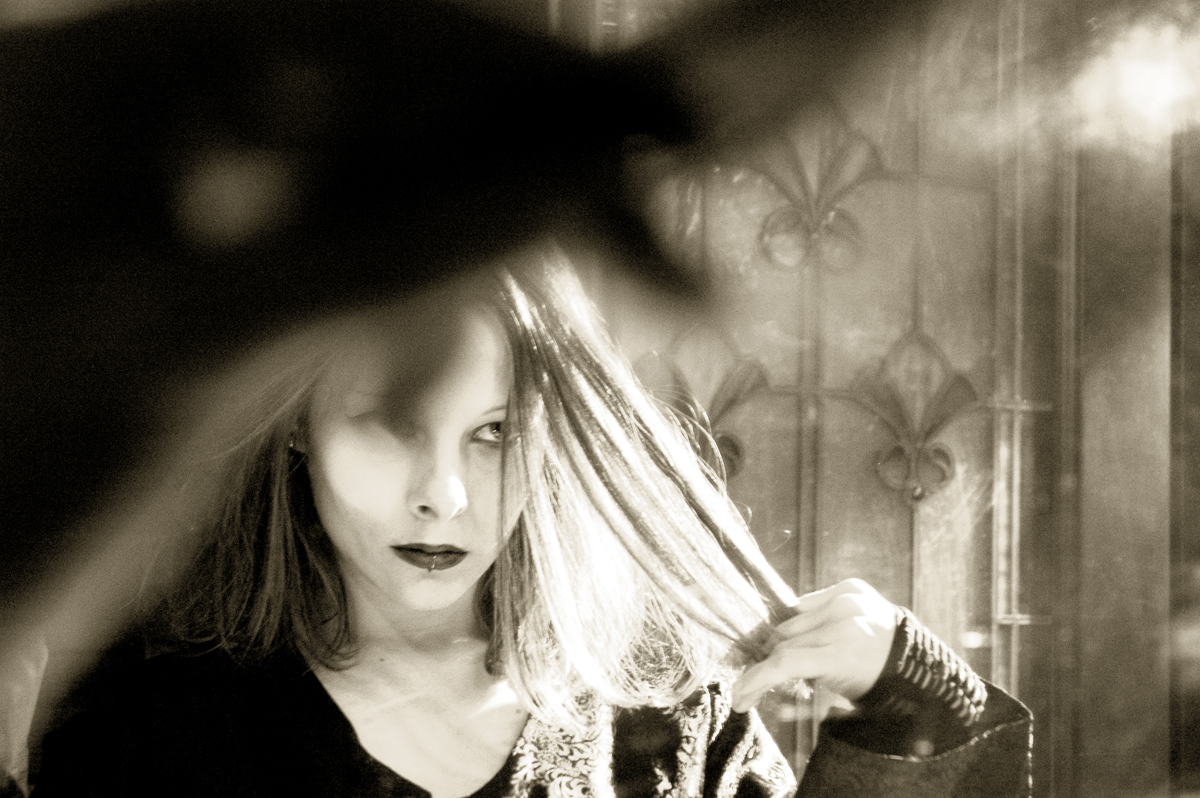
Ethereal aesthetics, closely related to the artwork of Nigel Grierson (4AD)

In March 1986, journalist Sue Cummings of SPIN described the music as an "introspective reaction to the macho aggression of rock 'n' roll" and noticed "all those big black haircuts leaving [after] the Cocteau Twins' concert this past fall." Soon, the ethereal style that has been dismissed at times as "swirly-girlie music" became closely associated with a certain type of audience, occasionally referred to as "ether(eal) goths" or "romantigoths". Liisa Ladouceur, writing in the Encyclopedia Gothica, said, "The Cocteau Twins remain ground zero for the Ethereal subgenre and ... gave Romantigoths a soundtrack for clubbing."

Other bands from the 1980s who spawned a similar sound were Dif Juz, Breathless, Lowlife, All About Eve, A Primary Industry, Vazz, and Drowning Pool (not to be confused with the metal band).

According to Heather Phares, arts editor at The Michigan Daily, the genre reached its first high point in 1986/87. At that time, Siouxsie and the Banshees released their studio album Tinderbox, followed by All About Eve's In the Clouds, A Primary Industry's Ultramarine, and Cocteau Twins' last ethereal E.P. Love's Easy Tears. In 1987, US band Area debuted with Radio Caroline while Vazz from Scotland, a former new wave/synthwave band, brought out Feverpitch that follows the footsteps of the Cocteau Twins. In the same year, Robin Guthrie produced A.R. Kane's "Lollita" single that features Cocteau Twins' ethereal trademark, comparable to the band's early records. A.R. Kane themselves called their musical style "dreampop", which later became a descriptive term for gentle indie-pop music (cf. Bel Canto, Pale Saints, the Sundays).

=== 1990s: peak and decline ===
Within the gothic/dark wave scene, the genre reached a higher level of popularity throughout the 1990s, especially in the first half of the decade. During this time, ethereal wave and rock genres such as shoegazing (aka dream pop) interacted with each other, with many artists being influenced by 4AD bands, such as the aforementioned Cocteau Twins and This Mortal Coil as well as early All About Eve, and Siouxsie and the Banshees. The Portsmouth-based ethereal band Siddal, for example, described their musical output as a "product of influences such as the Cocteau Twins, Low, Slowdive, the Cure, and Dead Can Dance, use a blend of ambient music, shoegazer style guitars, synths and sequenced rhythms." Other examples of this cross-pollination (partly referred to as "ethereal pop") include Hugo Largo, Rose Chronicles, Miranda Sex Garden, Cranes, Chimera, An April March, Hex, Common Language, the Glee Club, Lovesliescrushing, and Rosewater Elizabeth. Members of British shoegazing group Slowdive have cited being heavily influenced by artists such as the Cure, Cocteau Twins, and Siouxsie and the Banshees.

... the huge irony with the bands called 'Shoegazing' was that a lot of those bands really were into the Cocteau Twins. And they all used choruses, flangers and other effects pedals to create a certain kind of sound.

— Kevin Shields, Interview with My Bloody Valentine

Since the early 1990s, the "ethereal" tag is primarily associated with the Projekt label, which had already used the term in 1987. The label featured some of the most well-known acts of the US music scene such as Love Spirals Downwards and Lycia. Similar record labels that harbored some of the leading lights of the movement were Tess Records (This Ascension, Trance to the Sun, and Autumn), Bedazzled (Strange Boutique, Siddal, Mistle Thrush, and An April March), and Ivy Records (Faith & Disease, Ninth Circle). Most of these record labels and artists have ceased their activities over the years or changed their musical direction, incorporating elements of other genres such as ambient, trip hop, and drum & bass.

=== 2000s: after the decline ===
Autumn's Grey Solace

In the early 2000s, two Cocteau Twins tribute compilations, Dark Treasures (Cleopatra) and Half-Gifts (Dewdrops Records), were released, underlining the band's significant influence on the ethereal gothic sound.

More recent bands who partly represent the genre are Autumn's Grey Solace, Tearwave, Ashrae Fax, Mercury's Antennae, Saigon Blue Rain, Vision Eternel, Melodyguild, Faded Sympathy, Scarlet Mother, and the collaboration between Broaddaylight and Robin Guthrie.

== Distinction ==
Although ethereal wave and shoegazing (also referred to as dream pop) share some similarities (e.g. the use of guitar effects such as flanger, chorus, echo, and delay), there are substantial differences between the genres.

Shoegazing emerged primarily from the 1980s' noise pop/indie rock scene and a conventional instrumentation based on guitars, bass and drums. Initially, drum machines were not a regular part of the shoegazing genre but a basic component of new wave, post-punk, and gothic rock music. In contrast to shoegazing, ethereal wave usually features a traditional early 1980s post-punk and gothic rock signature, devoid of any influences of the simultaneously existing noise pop movement. Most ethereal wave groups, such as Cocteau Twins, early Dead Can Dance, Area, Love Spirals Downwards, Lycia, Autumn, and Speaking Silence, employed drum machines and electronically generated rhythms.

Ethereal wave is predominantly a female-fronted style, whereas shoegazing is − apart from the popularity of acts such as Lush, Curve, and Medicine − largely male-dominated (A.R. Kane, Pale Saints, Ride, Chapterhouse, Blind Mr. Jones, The Boo Radleys, Kitchens of Distinction) or, more rarely, gender-balanced (My Bloody Valentine, Slowdive, Secret Shine, The Telescopes). According to Joshua Gunn, Assistant Professor of Rhetorical Studies at Louisiana State University, "Women have a much larger role in Darkwave and [...] the Ethereal subgenre that developed in Europe".
