= Projekt Records =

American record label

- Founded: 1983
- Founder: Sam Rosenthal
- Distributor: Entertainment One Distribution
- Genre: Gothic rock, dark wave, ethereal wave, neoclassical dark wave, dream pop, shoegaze, ambient, dark cabaret
- Official website: www.projekt.com

Projekt Records is an independent record label established by Sam Rosenthal in 1983, the label focuses on electronic music, ambient, shoegaze, gothic rock, darkwave, ethereal, dream-pop, and dark cabaret releases.

== History ==
Projekt was founded in 1983 by Sam Rosenthal, as a record label concentrated on releasing dream-pop, neoclassical, ambient, gothic rock and shoegaze bands, including Rosenthal's own group, Black Tape for a Blue Girl.

=== Projekt: Darkwave ===
In 1993, the label expanded to include Projekt: Darkwave, a mail-order company for both the label's own music and for other labels with a similar ethos and approach, among them Tess Records and Hyperium Records.

=== Projektfest ===
Projekt Records also presents Projektfest, a semi-annual festival of gothic and ethereal music, primarily featuring Projekt artists. In 1996, Projektfest ran for two days in Chicago. In 1997, Chicago hosted the festival again, followed a few weeks later by another day of performances in Mexico City. In 1998, Projektfest ran a series of four one-day events in Los Angeles, Chicago, Philadelphia, and New York City. The 2002 Projektfest was held over three days in Philadelphia, at the Trocadero Theatre and other sites. Projekt hosted Projektfest'07 as part of the Blacksun Festival in New Haven, Connecticut, in August. Projektfest'10 was held on July 30 & 31, 2010. Projektfest'11 was held on November 12, 2011, at The Middle East nightclub in Cambridge, Massachusetts, featuring Voltaire, Black Tape for a Blue Girl, and Weep.

== Notable artists ==
=== Current ===
- Aarktica
- Aglaia
- Alio Die
- Black Tape for a Blue Girl
- Deepspace
- DELREI
- Forrest Fang
- Jeff Greinke
- Jarguna
- Morris Kolontyrsky
- Lowsunday
- Lorenzo Montana
- Peter Phillen
- Sam Rosenthal
- Steve Roach
- Mark Seelig
- Soriah
- Soulwhirlingsomewhere
- Michael Stearns
- Unto Ashes
- Vidna Obmana
- Erik Wøllo

=== Past ===
- Android Lust
- Arcana
- Attrition
- Audra
- Autumn's Grey Solace
- Controlled Bleeding
- Dark Sanctuary
- Eden
- Faith & Disease
- Fear Falls Burning
- Lisa Hammer
- Human Drama
- Katzenjammer Kabarett
- Love Spirals Downwards
- Lovesliescrushing
- Lovespirals
- Lycia
- Mark A. Michaels & Patricia Johnson
- Mira
- Mirabilis
- Mors Syphilitica
- O Yuki Conjugate
- Ordo Equitum Solis
- Shinjuku Thief
- Thanatos
- This Ascension
- Peter Ulrich
- Tara VanFlower
- Voltaire
- Weep
