= Dreamtime Return =

Studio album by Steve Roach
- Released: 1988
- Recorded: 1987–88 at The Timeroom
- Genre: Ambient, electronic
- Length: 130:23
- Label: Fortuna Records (original); Projekt Records (re-releases)
- Producer: Steve Roach

Steve Roach chronology
Quiet Music (1988)	Dreamtime Return (1988)	Stormwarning (1989)

Dreamtime Return is a 1988 double album by American ambient musician Steve Roach. Based on Australian Aboriginal culture and the concept of Dreamtime, it was largely inspired by an expedition Roach took to the Cape York Peninsula with a team of filmmakers producing a documentary about Aboriginal rock art. Production on the album began in 1986 and lasted two years. It is the album with which Roach feels he "came into [his] own as an artist".

Described as "one of the pivotal works of ambient music" and "groundbreaking," the album has been included on a number of lists of the world's best music, including 1,000 Recordings to Hear Before You Die. The album was remastered and reissued for its 30th anniversary in 2018.

== Production ==
=== Early concept development ===
Roach was first introduced to the concept of Dreamtime, the didgeridoo instrument, and other aspects of Australian Aboriginal culture with the film The Last Wave (1977) by Australian film director Peter Weir. At the time, Roach was living in Venice, a neighborhood of Los Angeles, and was spending time exploring Joshua Tree National Park. Roach felt a connection between the desert landscapes of his native southern California and those of Australia, and so in 1986, began to work on music exploring these themes. Around this time, Roach began using an Oberheim drum machine, and explored soundscapes with rhythmic grooves that gave a feeling of moving through an expansive desert. Knowing Roach was working on music thematically tied with Aboriginal culture, the owner of Roach's record label sent Roach a book about the Aboriginal peoples of the Cape York Peninsula, titled Archaeology of the Dreamtime, for inspiration.

Some tracks produced during this time would later feature on Dreamtime Return, such as "Towards the Dream". Another track was “The Other Side”, which was recorded live at Pomona College with Kevin Braheny and a string ensemble. Their setup included a ARP 2600 with three sequencers and the EMU sampler. Braheny also played an EWI (electronic wind instrument). The song was broadcast on the National Public Radio program Music from the Hearts of Space in 1986, This particular edition of the program, titled Starflight 1, was so popular that it was later released as an album.

=== Trip to Australia ===
Within a month of reading Archaeology of the Dreamtime, Roach received a call from photographer David Stahl, who had heard Roach's Structures from Silence (1984) on the radio. Coincidentally, Stahl had read the same book about Aboriginals, and had received funding from Ball State University to travel to that same region of Cape York and produce a documentary about Aboriginal rock art and Dreamtime. He asked Roach if he wanted to join the expedition as composer, to which he enthusiastically agreed. The production team was given the prestigious Explorers Club flag to bring on the trip.

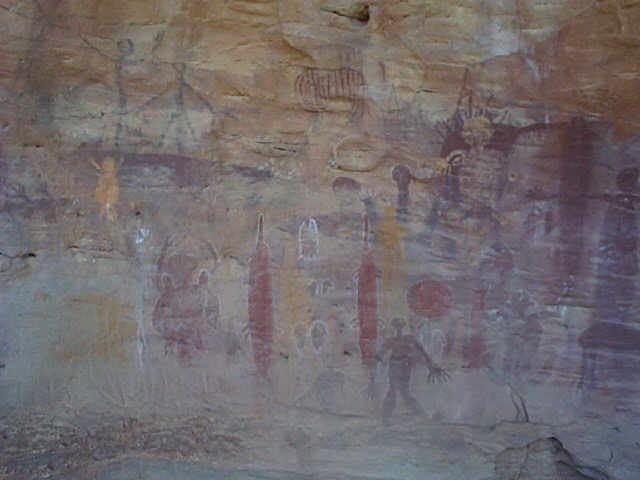
An example of Aboriginal rock art from the Cape York Peninsula

Roach's trip to Australia was the first time he left the United States. After arriving in Cape York, the team met up with Australian explorer Percy Trezise who had explored the area via plane, mapping out much of the Aboriginal sites. Trezise was close with the local Aboriginal tribes, and took the team to sacred areas no Westerners had visited, so they could document them for the film. One site they visited had a 200-foot rock wall with layers of paintings done by different generations over hundreds of years. The site inspired the track "Magnificent Gallery". Roach used a cassette Walkman to make audio recordings during the trip including birds, rocks, and other sounds, some of which were later mixed into the album. Trezise also provided Roach with audio recordings of ceremonies done with Dick Roughsey, an aboriginal artist and tribe elder. The track "Red Twilight with the Old Ones" uses these recordings.

When the expedition team was in Cairns, Roach was introduced to David Hudson, a didgeridoo player and member of an Aboriginal dance troupe. Roach recorded Hudson playing the instrument, which was used for the record. Hudson taught Roach how to play didgeridoo and the two would later collaborate on other works, including Australia: Sound of the Earth (1990).

=== Return to the United States ===
After Roach returned to the United States, he produced the rest of the album in his studio in Venice. Roach did not have any film footage to reference, but used audio recordings, photographs, and rocks from the trip to bring himself into the right headspace for composing. He used an E-mu Emax II for sampling. The film made during the expedition was released in 1988 as Australia's Art of the Dreamtime: Quinkan Country, and features Roach's music as the soundtrack. The documentary aired twice on PBS.

== Reception ==
Professional ratings
Review scores
Source	Rating
AllMusic	5/5 stars
Exclaim!	8/10

Roach's future wife Linda Kohanov lauded Dreamtime Return in a 1989 appraisal for CD Review, calling it Roach's "masterpiece" and that Roach "demonstrates that electronic music's greatest potential may lie in bringing our most elusive dreams and ancient memories into focus through potent, highly imaginative soundscapes."

Dreamtime Return helped Roach gain a worldwide reputation. Retrospectively, the album has been described by the Hartford Courant's Roger Catlin as "groundbreaking", and by AllMusic as a landmark of "fourth world" music. Author David B. Knight opined that Roach "seeks to activate listeners to reach a deep level of consciousness that draws upon the trance-inducing music he has created." Reviewing the album's 1998 reissue, Mark Burbey of Alternative Press wrote that Dreamtime Return "remains a landmark recording of extraordinary emotional resonance." It has also been included on a number of lists of the world's best music, including Tom Moon's 1,000 Recordings to Hear Before You Die (2008), which notes that it has come to be regarded as "one of the pivotal works of ambient music."

John Diliberto, host of the ambient music radio program Echoes, commented in 2005 that Dreamtime Return was "a seminal recording that has influenced a generation of musicians", while Hearts of Space presenter Stephen Hill said, "Musically Dreamtime richly deserves its classic status, but Roach also deserves credit for leading electronic musicians out of their sheltered studios and into an active relationship with the landscape, the wider world, and deep cultural history."

After Dreamtime Return was remastered and reissued for its 30th anniversary in 2018, Bryon Hayes from Exclaim! wrote, "Thirty years later, in a period of intense rediscovery of barely remembered classic albums, it's fitting that this iconic gem has been uncovered."

== Track listing ==
All tracks written by Steve Roach except where noted.

=== Two-disc CD release ===
Disc one
No.	Title	Writer(s)	Length
1.	"Towards the Dream"		7:08
2.	"The Continent"		4:49
3.	"Songline"	Robert Rich, Roach	3:10
4.	"Airtribe Meets the Dream Ghost"	Rich, Roach	7:00
5.	"A Circular Ceremony"		11:18
6.	"The Other Side"	Kevin Braheny, Roach	13:14
7.	"Magnificent Gallery"		6:07
8.	"Truth in Passing"		8:41
9.	"Australian Dawn – The Quiet Earth Cries Inside"		6:18

Disc two
No.	Title	Length
1.	"Looking for Safety"	31:21
2.	"Through a Strong Eye"	6:50
3.	"The Ancient Day"	6:06
4.	"Red Twilight with the Old Ones"	9:48
5.	"The Return"	8:33

=== 1988 Fortuna Records double-LP release ===
The 1988 double-LP release lacks the songs "Truth in Passing" and "Through a Strong Eye." It also has shorter edits of several other pieces, including a version of "Looking for Safety" that is 20 minutes shorter than the CD version.

Side one
No.	Title	Length
1.	"Towards the Dream"	7:08
2.	"The Continent"	4:48
3.	"Songline"	3:11
4.	"Airtribe Meets the Dream Ghost"	6:59

Side two
No.	Title	Length
1.	"A Circular Ceremony"	9:35
2.	"The Other Side"	13:13

Side three
No.	Title	Length
1.	"Magnificent Gallery"	5:03
2.	"Australian Dawn – The Quiet Earth Cries Inside"	5:11
3.	"Looking for Safety"	10:03

Side four
No.	Title	Length
1.	"The Ancient Day"	6:06
2.	"Red Twilight with the Old Ones"	9:48
3.	"The Return"	8:33

== Personnel ==
- Steve Roach – analog and digital synthesizers, sequencers, sampler, Macintosh with “M”, digital drums, Taos drum, sticks
- Kevin Braheny – Steiner EWI
- David Hudson – didjeridu
- Chuck Oken Jr – rainstick
- Robert Rich – gourd drum, dumbek
