= The Serpent's Lair =

Studio album by Steve Roach and Byron Metcalf
- Released: October 10, 2000
- Recorded: 1999–2000 at The Timeroom in Tucson, Arizona
- Genre: Ambient
- Length: 141:18
- Label: Projekt Records
- Producer: Steve Roach

Steve Roach chronology
Midnight Moon (2000)	The Serpent's Lair (2000)	Prayers to the Protector (2000)

Byron Metcalf chronology
Helpers, Guides & Allies... (Navigating the Shamanic Landscape) (1998)	The Serpent's Lair (2000)	Not Without Risk (2001)

Professional ratings
Review scores
Source	Rating
AllMusic	4.5/5 stars

The Serpent’s Lair is a two disc collaborative album by the American ambient artists Steve Roach and Byron Metcalf.

In the music, Steve Roach used a technique called Groove Alchemy.

== Track listing ==
=== Disc one: “The Serpent’s Lair” ===
1. ”The Lair” (12:14)
2. ”Rite of Passage” (14:09)
3. ”Shedding the Skin” (5:39)
4. ”Big Medicine” (12:53)
5. ”Future Tribe” (8:30)
6. ”Birthright” (5:59)
7. ”Osmosis”(4:04)
8. ”Egg Chamber Dreaming” (8:53)

=== Disc two: “Offerings from the Underworld” ===
1. ”Offering in Waves” (10:55)
2. ”Impending Sense of Calm” (9:03)
3. ”Cave Dwellers” (23:08)
4. ”Primal Passage” (4:47)
5. ”Serpent Clan” (5:02)
6. ”Breathing Heart of the Dragon Mother” (6:50)
7. ”Ochua” (9:26)

booklet

== Personnel ==
- Steve Roach (synthesizers, samplers, percussion, didgeridoo, breath, shakers, ocarinas, voice)
- Byron Metcalf (percussion, frame drums, djembe, tom-toms, bass drum, clay pots, shakers, rattles, ashiko, rainstick)
- Vicki Richards (violin)
- Lena Stevens (voice)
- Vidna Obmana (guitar)
- Jeffrey Fayman (djembe)
- Momodu Kah (djembe)
- Jorge Reyes (flutes, ocarinas, whistles, percussion, voice)
- Jim Cole (voices)
- Vir Unis (synthesizers)
