= Stream of Thought =

Studio album by Steve Roach and Erik Wøllo
- Released: January 13, 2009
- Recorded: 2007–2008
- Studio: Wintergarden, Norway and the Timeroom, Sonoita, Arizona
- Genre: Ambient
- Length: 69:49
- Label: Projekt
- Producer: Steve Roach and Erik Wøllo

Steve Roach chronology
Nada Terma (2008)	Stream of Thought (2009)	Dynamic Stillness (2009)

Professional ratings
Review scores
Source	Rating
Allmusic	3.5/5 stars

Stream of Thought is the first collaborative album by American ambient musician Steve Roach and Norwegian musician Erik Wøllo . Described as "A continuous stream of sonic consciousness", with an uninterrupted flow of 19 interconnected pieces. The concept to the album's structure was like film editing, with a sense of time and pacing consciously developed to activate a visceral experience. In 2011 The Road Eternal was released, their second collaboration album.

== Reception ==
AllMusic rated the album a 3.5 of 5, saying "ultimately this is an album for dedicated fans of either artist rather than newcomers".

== Track listing ==
All tracks are written by Steve Roach and Erik Wøllo.

No.	Title	Length
1.	"Stream of Thought - part 1"	5:31
2.	"Stream of Thought - part 2"	7:07
3.	"Stream of Thought - part 3"	1:56
4.	"Stream of Thought - part 4"	4:03
5.	"Stream of Thought - part 5"	2:28
6.	"Stream of Thought - part 6"	0:57
7.	"Stream of Thought - part 7"	2:12
8.	"Stream of Thought - part 8"	1:59
9.	"Stream of Thought - part 9"	3:17
10.	"Stream of Thought - part 10"	4:17
11.	"Stream of Thought - part 11"	0:41
12.	"Stream of Thought - part 12"	0:52
13.	"Stream of Thought - part 13"	6:46
14.	"Stream of Thought - part 14"	0:37
15.	"Stream of Thought - part 15"	2:35
16.	"Stream of Thought - part 16"	2:32
17.	"Stream of Thought - part 17"	3:14
18.	"Stream of Thought - part 18"	4:28
19.	"Stream of Thought - part 19"	14:17
Total length:		69:49

== Personnel ==
Adapted from Discogs

- Erik Wøllo – acoustic guitar, electric guitar, mandolin, bass guitar, synthesizer, loops, performer
- John Vega – cover
- Sam Rosenthal – graphic design
- Erik Wøllo – composer, mixing, producer, sequencer
- Steve Roach – composer, Mixing, producer, sequencer, mastering
- Steve Roach – synthesizer, performer, loops
