= Afterlight =

(The) Afterlight may refer to:

- UFO: Afterlight, a 2007 video game
- Afterlight (album), a 2009 album by Steve Roach
- Thea Gilmore, also known as Afterlight, English singer-songwriter
- The Afterlight (2009 film), an American drama film
- The Afterlight (2021 film), an experimental art film
- "After Light", a 2012 song by Rustie
