= Shaman's Heart II: The Healing Journey =

The Shaman's Heart II: The Healing Journey

Studio album by Byron Metcalf featuring Steve Roach
- Released: November 1, 2011
- Studio: The Lair, Prescott, Arizona and The Timeroom, Southern Arizona.
- Genre: Ambient
- Length: 71:10
- Label: Projekt
- Producer: Byron Metcalf

Steve Roach chronology
The Road Eternal (2011)	The Shaman's Heart II: The Healing Journey (2011)	Groove Immersion (2012)

Professional ratings
Review scores
Source	Rating
Allmusic	3.5/5 stars
Musique Machine	3/5 stars

The Shaman's Heart II: The Healing Journey is a collaborative album by ambient musicians Byron Metcalf with Steve Roach, as guest. This is the second of Byron Metcalf's The Shaman's Heart series album, focused around a continuous "heartbeat" pace. Unlike the first volume, this disc contain ten seamless untitled tracks. The track numbers on the physical CD described as "way points" and not as individual tracks as on a typical CD. Produced, recorded, mixed & mastered at The Lair, Prescott, Arizona. Steve's elements recorded at the Timeroom, Southern Arizona.

== Track listing ==
No.	Title	Length
1.	"Untitled"	10:40
2.	"Untitled"	5:03
3.	"Untitled"	4:56
4.	"Untitled"	5:05
5.	"Untitled"	6:51
6.	"Untitled"	7:05
7.	"Untitled"	5:50
8.	"Untitled"	6:33
9.	"Untitled"	9:13
10.	"Untitled"	9:48

== Personnel ==
Adapted from Discogs

- Maud Wirström – artwork
- Steve Roach – composer, didgeridoo, ocarina, synthesizer, electronics, loops
- Byron Metcalf – composer, producer, recorder, mixing, mastering, drums, performer, frame drum, rattle, percussion, voice
- Sam Rosenthal – graphic design
