= Truth and Beauty =

Truth and Beauty may refer to:

- Truth & Beauty: The Lost Pieces Volume Two, an album by the American ambient musician Steve Roach
- Truth and Beauty (Ian McNabb album)
- Truth & Beauty: A Friendship, a memoir by Ann Patchett

== See also ==
- "Ode on a Grecian Urn", an 1819 poem by John Keats which contains the words "Beauty is truth, truth beauty"
- Truth quark and beauty quark, two elementary particles postulated in 1973 and subsequently observed
