= Light Fantastic (album) =

Studio album by Steve Roach
- Released: 1999
- Genre: Ambient
- Length: 58:36
- Label: Hearts of Space
- Producer: Steve Roach

Steve Roach chronology
| Body Electric (1999) | Light Fantastic (1999) | Vine ~ Bark & Spore (2000) |

Professional ratings
Review scores
| Source | Rating |
|---|---|
| Allmusic | 4/5 stars |
| Progressive World | 4/5 stars |

Light Fantastic is an album by the American ambient musician Steve Roach, released in 1999.

== Track listing ==
| No. | Title | Length |
|---|---|---|
| 1. | "Trip the Light" | 8:34 |
| 2. | "Breathing the Pulse" | 5:25 |
| 3. | "The Reflecting Chamber" | 7:05 |
| 4. | "Touch the Pearl" | 9:24 |
| 5. | "Realm of Refraction" | 11:20 |
| 6. | "The Luminous Return" | 16:48 |

== Personnel ==
- Steve Roach – arranger, composer, producer, performer
- Stephen Hill – art direction
- Vir Unis – computer (filter and fractal groove creation infusions)
- Jeremy Hulette – design
- Bob Olhsson – mastering
- Stephen Hill – mastering
- Roger King – pre-mastering
