= Terraform =

Terraform or Terraformer may refer to:

- Terraforming, a hypothetical planetary engineering process
- Terraform (software), an infrastructure-as-code software tool by HashiCorp

== Music ==
- Terraform (Shellac album), 1998
- Terraform (Steve Roach and Loren Nerell album), 2006
- TerraForm, an album by the Sam Roberts Band, 2016
- "Terraform", a song by the Dandy Warhols from Why You So Crazy, 2019
- Terraformer (Knut album), 2005
- Terraformer (Thank You Scientist album), 2019

== Literature ==
- The Terraformers, a 2023 science fiction novel by Annalee Newitz

== See also ==
- Terra Formars, a Japanese manga series
