= A Deeper Silence =

Studio album by Steve Roach
- Released: April 15, 2008
- Recorded: at the Timeroom in Tucson, Arizona
- Genre: Ambient
- Length: 73:43
- Label: Timeroom Editions
- Producer: Steve Roach

Steve Roach chronology
Revealing the Secret (Ascension of Shadows III) (2008)	A Deeper Silence (2008)	Landmass (2008)

Audio sample
- file; help

Professional ratings
Review scores
Source	Rating
e/i Magazine	positive
Musique Machine	4/5 stars

A Deeper Silence (2008) is an album by the American ambient musician Steve Roach.

== Concept ==
A Deeper Silence was created to be unobtrusive and minimal, similar in nature to Structures from Silence and Darkest Before Dawn, and forgoes the more apparent layering, weaving of sound, and subtle shifts in structure that occur in the Immersion series. The long-form piece, in its entirety, remains in the deeper tonal ranges, and is described by Steve Roach as "billowing...like a big sigh," "breathing," and "infinite in its essence."

== Production ==
Upon completion, A Deeper Silence was played back in "loop mode" for four months in Steve Roach's sleep chamber before being released.

== Track listing ==
No.	Title	Length
1.	"A Deeper Silence"	73:43

== Personnel ==
- Steve Roach – synthesizers
