= Forgotten Gods =

Studio album by Steve Roach, Jorge Reyes & Suso Saiz as Suspended Memories
- Released: 1993
- Recorded: Timeroom, Tucson, AZ
- Genre: Ambient
- Length: 58:59
- Label: Hearts of Space
- Producer: Steve Roach, Jorge Reyes & Suso Saiz

Steve Roach chronology
The Lost Pieces (1993)	Forgotten Gods (1993)	Origins (1993)

Professional ratings
Review scores
Source	Rating
Allmusic	5/5 stars

Forgotten Gods is a collaborative album by American ambient musicians Steve Roach, Jorge Reyes & Suso Saiz as Suspended Memories. Recorded and mixed at the Timeroom, Tucson, AZ. Mastered at Hearts of Space studio, San Francisco.

== Reception ==
AllMusic rated this album 5 stars, stating, "The album sounds really great when the volume is turned up. That way you can really feel the ominous power and all the nuances in the music."

== Track listing ==
All tracks are written by Jorge Reyes, Steve Roach & Suso Saiz.

No.	Title	Length
1.	"Different Deserts"	12:20
2.	"Snake Song"	6:44
3.	"Night Devotion"	3:51
4.	"Saguaro"	5:23
5.	"Mutual Tribes"	7:06
6.	"Suspended Memories, Forgotten Gods"	6:01
7.	"Ritual Noise"	3:48
8.	"Distant Look"	7:39
9.	"Shaman's Dream"	6:07

== Personnel ==
- Steve Roach, Jorge Reyes, Suso Saiz – performer, producer
- Steve Roach – didgeridoo, flute, percussion, sequencer, synthesizer, voice
- Jorge Reyes – drums, flute, ocarina, percussion, rainstick, voice, whistle
- Stephen Hill – artwork, design, mastering
- Jose Luis Crespo, Suso Saiz – editing
- Suso Sáiz – effects, electric guitar, percussion
- Linda Kohanov – liner notes
- Steve Roach, Suso Saiz – mixing, recording
- David Muench – photography

== See also ==
- Steve Roach
- Jorge Reyes
- Ambient music
- Electronic music
