= Vine ~ Bark & Spore =

Studio album by Steve Roach and Jorge Reyes
- Released: 2000
- Studio: The Timeroom in Tucson, Arizona
- Genre: Ambient
- Length: 72:01
- Label: Timeroom Editions
- Producer: Steve Roach

Steve Roach chronology
Light Fantastic (1999)	Vine ~ Bark & Spore (2000)	Early Man (2000)

Jorge Reyes chronology
Mexican Music: Prehispanic Rituals (1996)	Vine ~ Bark & Spore (2000)	La Otra Conquista (2000)

Professional ratings
Review scores
Source	Rating
Allmusic	4.5/5 stars

Vine ~ Bark & Spore is a collaborative album by ambient musicians Steve Roach and Jorge Reyes.

== Track listing ==
1. ”Clearing Place” (2:38)
2. ”Sorcerer’s Temple” (5:21)
3. ”The Holy Dirt” (13:43)
4. ”Night Journey” (13:38)
5. ”Spore and Bark” (11:21)
6. ”Healing Temple” (5:50)
7. ”Gone from Here” (19:27)
