= Spirit Dome =

Live album by Steve Roach and Vidna Obmana
- Released: 2004
- Recorded: May 24, 2002 at Room 314 Philadelphia, Pennsylvania
- Length: 73:31
- Label: Projekt Records
- Producer: Steve Roach

Steve Roach chronology
Life Sequence (2003)	Spirit Dome (2004)	Fever Dreams (2004)

Vidna Obmana chronology
An Opera for Four Fusion Works, Act 1 (2002)	Spirit Dome (2004)	An Opera for Four Fusion Works, Act 2 (2004)

Professional ratings
Review scores
Source	Rating
Allmusic	4/5 stars

Spirit Dome is a collaborative album by ambient musicians Steve Roach and Vidna Obmana. It was recorded in a live studio session in Philadelphia, Pennsylvania on May 24, 2002, beginning at around 1 AM. Although there are eight tracks on the CD they are not individually titled, making Spirit Dome a single 73 minute piece of music.

The music consists of electronic drones and other treated sound sources similar to Early Man.

== Track listing ==
1. (10:23)
2. (21:30)
3. (11:58)
4. (4:01)
5. (3:59)
6. (6:09)
7. (8:47)
8. (6:39)
