= The Delicate Forever =

Studio album by Steve Roach
- Released: July 22, 2014
- Genre: Ambient
- Length: 73:47
- Label: Projekt
- Producer: Steve Roach

Steve Roach chronology
The Long Night (2014)	The Delicate Forever (2014)	The Desert Collection – Volume One (2014)

Professional ratings
Review scores
Source	Rating
Hypnagogue	positive

The Delicate Forever (2014) is an album by American ambient musician Steve Roach. It contains minimal electronics interplay musical space, breath, silence, and rich textural colors in a subtle dynamic flow. Recorded at Timeroom, manufactured by Disc Makers. Created using primarily analog equipment at The Timeroom, Southern Arizona, during 2013 and 2014.

== Reception ==
The album debuted at number six on the Billboard New Age chart.

Hypnagogue reviewed this album positively, said that "The Delicate Forever is one of those Steve Roach works that’s designed to augment the space around you or open the space within you, depending on how you choose to listen. Each of the five pieces is marked by its own texture."

== Track listing ==
No.	Title	Length
1.	"The Delicate Forever (edit)"	24:42
2.	"Well Spring"	13:35
3.	"Where the Mysteries Sleep"	12:35
4.	"Perfect Sky"	13:45
5.	"HearAfter"	9:10

== Personnel ==
- Steve Roach – performer
- Sam Rosenthal – design, layout
- Steve Matson – cover
