= Blood Machine =

Studio album by Steve Roach, Vir Unis
- Released: 6 June 2001
- Recorded: 2000–2001
- Studio: The Bubble and The Timeroom
- Genre: Ambient
- Length: 73:15
- Label: Green House Music
- Producer: Steve Roach, Vir Unis

Steve Roach chronology
Early Man (2000)	Blood Machine (2001)	Time of the Earth (2001)

Professional ratings
Review scores
Source	Rating
Allmusic	3/5 stars

Blood Machine is the second collaborative album by American ambient musicians Steve Roach and Vir Unis, released in 2001.

== Reception ==
AllMusic rated the album a 3 of 5, stating "Blood Machine is quite a departure from both Roach's and Vir Unis' work of late, but undoubtedly this is one of the freshest recordings of 2001."

== Track listing ==
No.	Title	Length
1.	"Dissolving the Code"	7:28
2.	"Evolution"	11:38
3.	"Impulse"	10:07
4.	"Neurotropic"	6:23
5.	"Mindheart Infusion"	12:20
6.	"Sense"	7:57
7.	"Neural Connection"	12:07
8.	"In the Marrow"	5:15

== Personnel ==
Adapted from Discogs.

- Sam Rosenthal – layout
- Roger King – mastering
- Steve Roach – mixing, performer, mastering, artwork
- Vir Unis – performer, cover images
