= Molecules of Motion =

Studio album by Steve Roach
- Released: June 1, 2018
- Recorded: August 2017 – March 2018
- Venue: Baja Arizona
- Studio: Timehouse
- Genre: Ambient, Berlin School, electronic
- Length: 73:15
- Label: Projekt
- Producer: Steve Roach

Steve Roach chronology
Eclipse Mix (2017)	Molecules of Motion (2018)	Return to the Dreamtime (2018)

Professional ratings
Review scores
Source	Rating
Allmusic	4/5 stars
Musique Machine	5/5 stars

Molecules of Motion is a studio album by Steve Roach, released on June 1, 2018.

It was nominated for Best New Age Album at the 61st Annual Grammy Awards.

== Track listing ==
1. "Molecules of Motion" - 24:21
2. "Grace Meditation" - 23:39
3. "Phase Reverie" - 10:11
4. "Empath Current" - 15:02

Track listing adapted from the iTunes Store
