= The Road Eternal =

Studio album by Steve Roach and Erik Wøllo
- Released: June 14, 2011
- Recorded: 2010–2011
- Studio: The Timeroom, Arizona and Wintergarden Studio, Norway
- Genre: Ambient, electronic
- Length: 62:49
- Label: Projekt
- Producer: Steve Roach and Erik Wøllo

Steve Roach chronology
| Immersion Five - Circadian Rhythms (2011) | The Road Eternal (2011) | Groove Immersion (2012) |

Professional ratings
Review scores
| Source | Rating |
|---|---|
| Allmusic | 3.5/5 stars |
| Musique Machine | 4/5 stars |

The Road Eternal is the second collaborative album by American ambient musician Steve Roach and Norwegian musician Erik Wøllo. This is the follow-up of their album collaboration Stream of Thought (Projekt, 2009). Electronic music with six rhythmic sequencer-based tracks intersperse with ambient zones and soaring electric guitar textures.

== Reception ==
AllMusic rated the album a 3.5 of 5, concluding "another fine demonstration of the duo's abilities".

== Track listing ==
All tracks are written by Steve Roach and Erik Wøllo.

| No. | Title | Length |
|---|---|---|
| 1. | "The Road Eternal" | 21:21 |
| 2. | "Depart at Sunrise" | 9:16 |
| 3. | "The Next Place" | 12:15 |
| 4. | "First Twilight" | 4:35 |
| 5. | "Travel by Moonlight" | 10:06 |
| 6. | "Night Strands" | 5:16 |

== Personnel ==
Adapted from Discogs

- Erik Wøllo – composer, mixing, producer, electric guitar, synthesizer, photography
- Steve Roach – composer, mixing, producer, mastering, synthesizer, electronics, loops, performer, photography
- Sam Rosenthal – graphic design
