= Nightbloom =

Studio album by Steve Roach and Mark Seelig
- Released: September 14, 2010
- Studio: Timeroom
- Genre: Ambient
- Length: 73:44
- Label: Projekt
- Producer: Steve Roach

Steve Roach chronology
| Sigh of Ages (2010) | Nightbloom (2010) | The Desert Inbetween (2011) |

Professional ratings
Review scores
| Source | Rating |
|---|---|
| Allmusic | 3.5/5 stars |
| Hypnagogue | favorable |

Nightbloom is the collaborative album by ambient musicians Steve Roach and Mark Seelig, containing Mark's vocal and Tuva-style overtoning, combining Steve's zones and grooves. The disc features five seamless parts, single-track composition.

== Songs ==
The first track features a slow rising and falling bass tone for the first eight minutes until a subtle percussion pattern begins to emerge slowly from deep in the mix. The second track brings a drumming loop, further laden with echo as the main drones continue steadily. The third track subtly the drones and the drums with a slow martial summoning, as does the fourth track. The final track strips away the drumming for the first part because a final, helping to sum up and send out the album on a strong note.

== Reception ==
AllMusic rated the album a 3.5 of 5, saying "it's enjoyable more than remarkable, but Roach and Seelig are nothing if not listenable composers for a variety of moods".

Hypnagogue highly rated the album, saying "Nightbloom has taken me to amazing places and shown me incredible things every time I’ve listened".

== Track listing ==
| No. | Title | Length |
|---|---|---|
| 1. | "Untitled" | 18:32 |
| 2. | "Untitled" | 12:39 |
| 3. | "Untitled" | 13:55 |
| 4. | "Untitled" | 12:32 |
| 5. | "Untitled" | 16:02 |

== Personnel ==
Adapted from Discogs

- Sam Rosenthal – artwork, design
- Steve Roach – drone, electronics
- Mark Seelig – overtone voice
- Steve Roach – photography
- Dawn Wilson-Enoch – photography
- Steve Roach – recorder, mixing, arranger
- Beate Maria – tambura
