= Fever Dreams (Steve Roach album) =

Studio album by Steve Roach
- Released: 2004
- Studio: The Timeroom in Tucson, Arizona and The Lair in Prescott, Arizona
- Genre: Ambient
- Length: 73:24
- Label: Projekt Records
- Producer: Steve Roach

Steve Roach chronology
Spirit Dome (2004)	Fever Dreams (2004)	Mantram (2004)

Professional ratings
Review scores
Source	Rating
AllMusic	4.5/5 stars

Fever Dreams (2004) is an album by the American ambient musician Steve Roach. The music consists of bizarre, hallucinatory textures and tribal percussion. The first track, "Wicked Dream", was co-composed with Patrick O'Hearn.

This album is continued with Holding the Space – Fever Dreams II.

== Track listing ==
All tracks by Steve Roach except where noted.

1. "Wicked Dream" (Patrick O'Hearn, Roach) – 18:41
2. "Fever Pulse" – 10:34
3. "Tantra Mantra" – 29:36
4. "Moved Beyond" – 14:30

== Personnel ==
- Steve Roach – (synthesizers, guitar, percussion, bass)
- Patrick O'Hearn – (bass and guitar on "Wicked Dream")
- Will Merkle – (bass on "Fever Pulse")
- Byron Metcalf – (frame drum and percussion on "Tantra Mantra" and "Moved Beyond")
