= Steve Roach (musician) =

American composer and musician

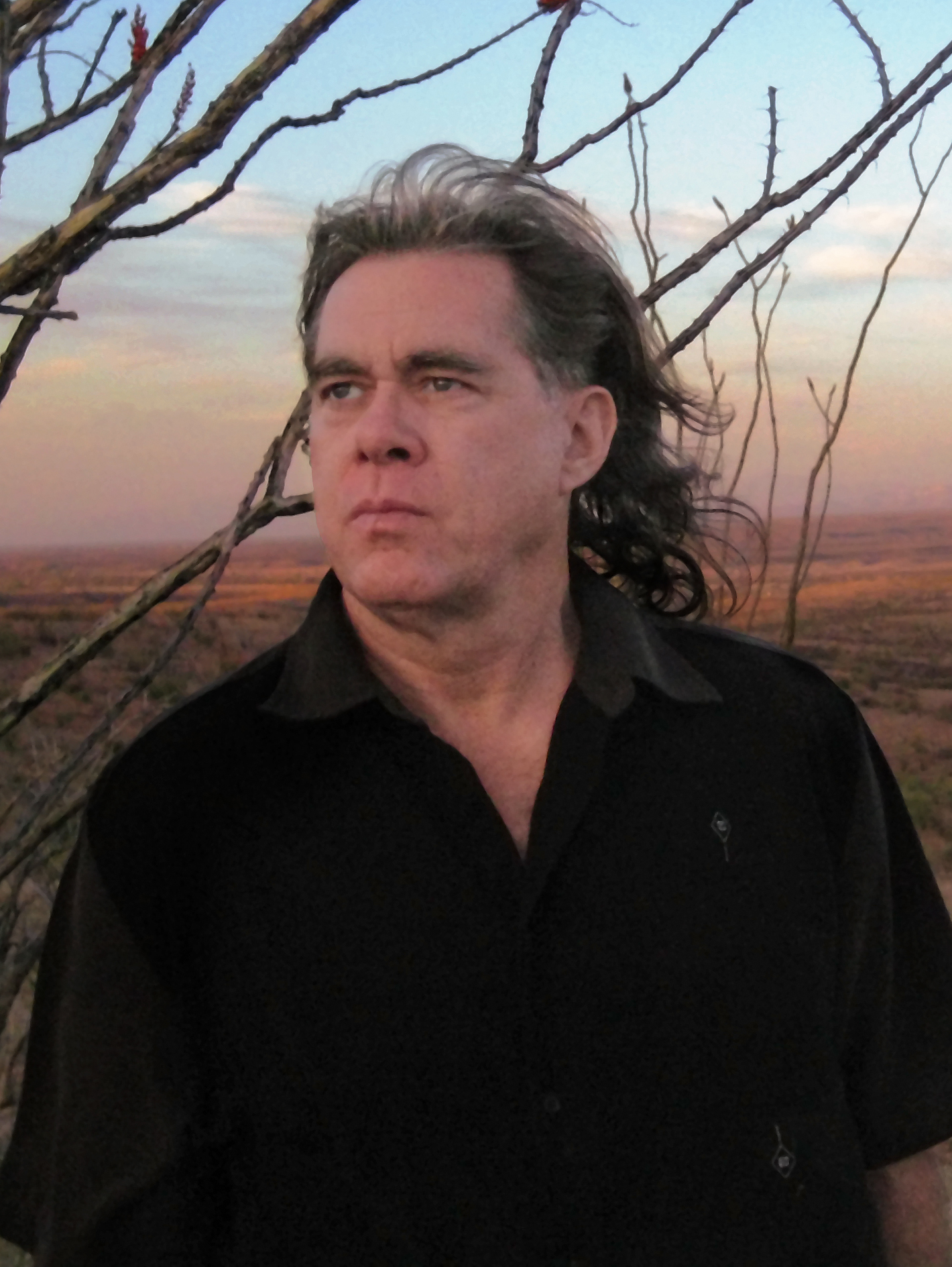
- Roach in 2013 in Tucson, Arizona

Background information
- Born: February 16, 1955 (age 71); La Mesa, California, U.S.
- Genres: Ambient, electronic
- Occupations: Composer, musician
- Instruments: Synthesizers, didgeridoo
- Website: steveroach.com

Steve Roach (born February 16, 1955) is an American composer and performer of ambient and electronic music, whose recordings are informed by his impressions of environment, perception, flow and space. His work has been influential in the trance and new-age genres.

Roach has received two Grammy Award nominations for New Age Album of the Year: His 2017 album Spiral Revelation for the 60th Annual Grammy Awards., and 2018's Molecules of Motion for the 61st Annual Grammy Awards. His double album, Dreamtime Return (1988), was listed in 1,000 Recordings to Hear Before You Die.

== Biography ==
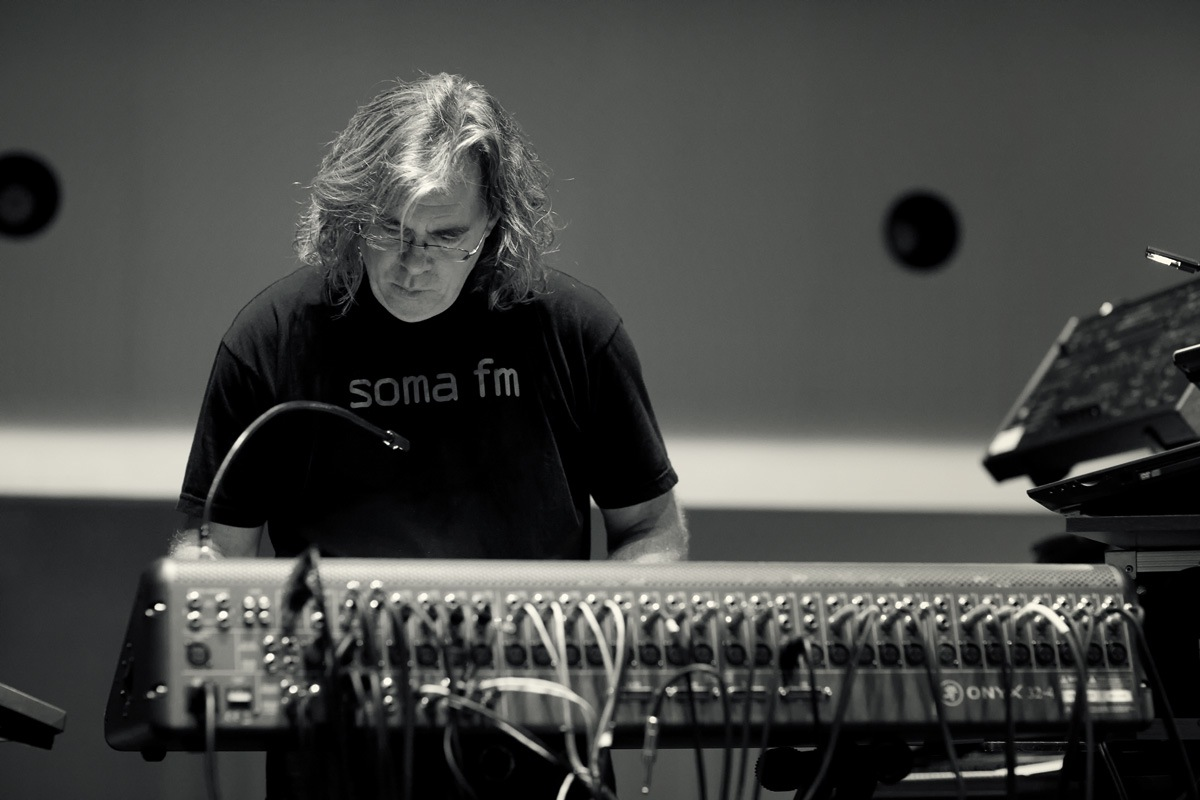
Roach during a soundcheck at SoundQuest in October 2010, Tucson, Arizona

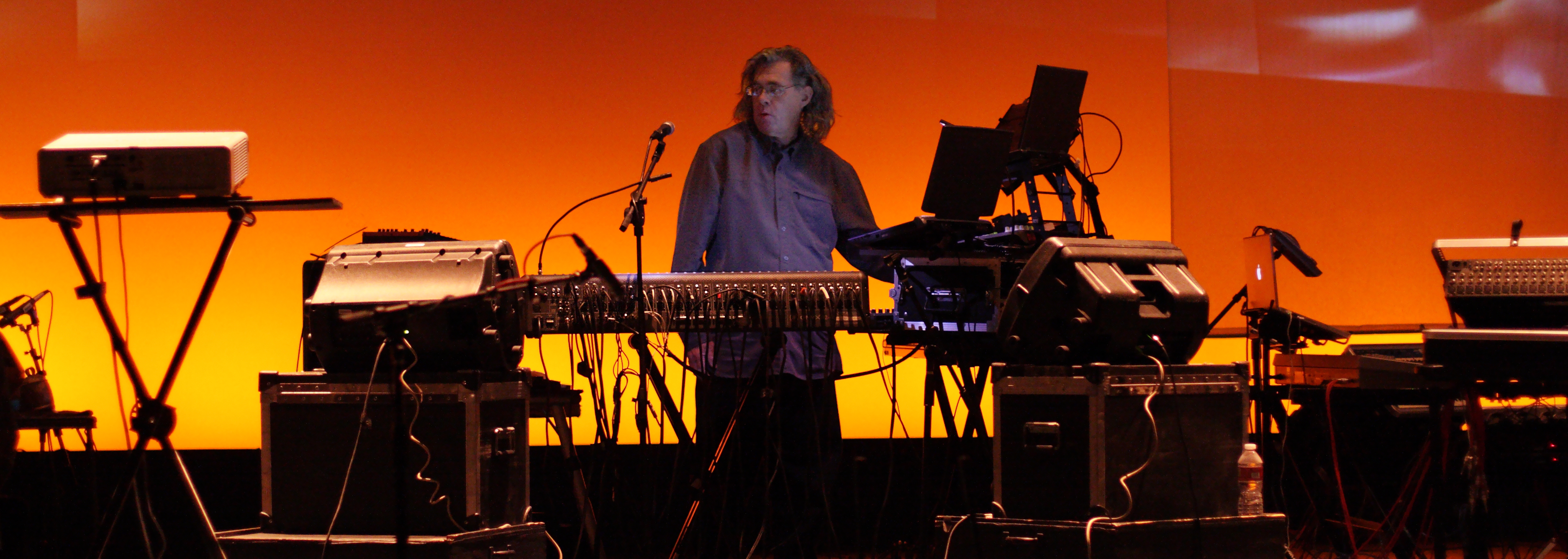
Steve Roach performing at SoundQuest 2010

Roach was born a February 16, 1955 in La Mesa, California, a suburb of San Diego. He is an only child. He developed a passion for Motocross racing in the early 1970s, experiences from which he incorporated into his composing and performing later on. "You have to be fully awake and present ... All of those things relate right over to what would become my path in music. You're completely in; you're inside of it, your life depends on it. That set the tone." Having grown up near deserts, mountains, and the ocean, these became key aesthetic influences in Roach's music. Roach was greatly influenced by electronic music as a teenager, particularly Timewind (1975) by Klaus Schulze and works by Tangerine Dream and Brian Eno. He was also influenced by progressive rock, namely Close to the Edge (1972) by Yes and Ummagumma (1969) by Pink Floyd.

Roach taught himself to play the synthesizer when he was 20; among his first instruments were a Roland SH-3A and Vox Continental. He went on to purchase a Micromoog, ARP 2600, and ARP String Ensemble at once with a "super high interest loan". He lived in Hollywood, California for a brief time, during which he worked at the Licorice Pizza record store alongside future The Simpsons creator Matt Groening, and became a part of the electronic music community in the Los Angeles area. He moved to a bungalow in Culver City, in which he built a recording studio named the Timeroom and worked odd jobs while creating music.

His debut album, Now, was released in 1982. Two years later, he released his best known album, Structures from Silence (1984). He had pressed a run of cassettes of the album, which caught the attention of Stephen Hill who played it on his Hearts of Space radio show on KCRW, which generated further interest in Roach's music. In 1986 he released his acclaimed Quiet Music series. In 1988, he released what has been described by critics as his masterpiece, the double-album Dreamtime Return.

In 1995, Roach signed with Projekt Records, which has since been his primary label.

As Roach's approach to ambient music has matured, his compositions have typically been beatless. His rhythmic and trance-based groove and tribal-ambient releases, however, are nearly as numerous as his more atmospheric releases. Some recordings are strictly synthesizer-based, whereas others include ambient guitar experiments.

Other pieces, however, cross over with more ethnic and folk influences. Roach learned to play the digeridoo during his extended trips to Australia in the 1980s, and he became an early proponent of its use in ambient music. His work with Mexican musician Jorge Reyes introduced Roach to Prehispanic musical elements, which he has also included in his music. These fusions established Roach as one of the founders of the tribal-ambient sound.

== Personal life ==
Roach is married to author and equine teacher Linda Kohanov, who provided vocals on some of his albums. In the early 1990s, Roach moved to the Sonoran Desert near Tucson, Arizona.

== Discography ==
=== Studio albums ===
- Now (1982)
- Traveler (1983 Domino)
- Structures from Silence (1984 Fortuna) – remastered 2001
- Quiet Music 1 (1986 Fortuna) -cassette
- Empetus (1986 Fortuna) -cassette, CD, vinyl - 2 discs, (re-released on Projekt 2008) - CD, Digital (re-released on Projekt 2017)
- Quiet Music 2 (1986 Fortuna) -cassette
- Quiet Music 3 (1986 Fortuna) -cassette
- Dreamtime Return (1988 Fortuna) – 2 discs, (remastered 2005 Projekt)
- World's Edge (1992 Fortuna) – 2 discs
- Origins (1993 Fortuna)
- The Dream Circle (1994 Soundquest LTD1) -CD (Limited 2000 copies)
- Artifacts (1994 Fortuna)
- The Dreamer Descends (1995 Amplexus)
- The Magnificent Void (1996 Hearts of Space)
- On This Planet (1997 Hearts of Space)
- Slow Heat (1998 Timeroom Editions 1)
- Light Fantastic (1999 Hearts of Space)
- The Dream Circle (1999 Timeroom Editions) Re-release of 1994 CD
- Atmospheric Conditions (1999 Timeroom Editions)
- Early Man (2000 Manifold) - (1 disc Limited Slate Slab PKG)
- Midnight Moon (2000 Projekt)
- Early Man (2001 Projekt) - 2 discs
- Core (2001 Timeroom Editions)
- Streams & Currents (2001)
- Darkest Before Dawn (2002)
- Mystic Chords & Sacred Spaces (2003 Projekt) – 4 discs
- Life Sequence (2003)
- Fever Dreams (2004)
- Holding the Space: Fever Dreams II (2004 Timeroom Editions)
- Possible Planet (2005)
- New Life Dreaming (2005)
- Immersion: One (2006 Projekt)
- Proof Positive (2006)
- Kairos: The Meeting of Time and Destiny (2006) – CD + DVD
- Immersion: Two (2006 Projekt)
- Immersion: Three (2007) – 3 discs
- Fever Dreams III (2007) – 2 discs
- Arc of Passion (2007) - 2 discs
- A Deeper Silence (2008)
- Dynamic Stillness (2009) – 2 discs
- Immersion: Four (2009 Timeroom Editions)
- Afterlight (2009)
- Destination Beyond (2009)
- Sigh of Ages (2010)
- Immersion Five – Circadian Rhythms (2011)
- Groove Immersion (2012)
- Back to Life (2012)
- Soul Tones (2012)
- Future Flows (2013)
- Spiral Meditations (2013)
- The Delicate Forever (2014)
- The Delicate Beyond (2014)
- Bloodmoon Rising Night 2 (2014)
- Invisible (2015)
- Bloodmoon Rising Night 3 (2015)
- Skeleton Keys (2015 Projekt)
- Etheric Imprints (2015 Projekt)
- Vortex Immersion Zone (2015 Timeroom Editions)
- Skeleton – Spiral Passage (2015 Timeroom Digital)
- Emotions Revealed (2015 Projekt)
- This Place to Be (2016 Timeroom Editions 38)
- Shadow of Time (2016)
- Painting in the Dark (2016 Timeroom Editions 40)
- Fade to Gray (2016 Timeroom Editions 41)
- Spiral Revelation (2016)
- The Passing (2017 Timeroom Editions 39)
- Nostalgia for the Future (2017 Timeroom Editions 42)
- Long Thoughts (2017)
- Eclipse Mix (2017 Timeroom Editions 43)
- Molecules of Motion (2018)
- Return to the Dreamtime (2018 Timeroom Editions 44)
- Electron Birth (2018 Timeroom Edition 45)
- Mercurius (2018)
- Atmosphere for Dreaming (2018 Timeroom Editions 46)
- Bloom Ascension (2019)
- Trance Archeology (2019)
- Stillpoint (2020 Timeroom Editions 47)
- A Soul Ascends (2020)
- Tomorrow (2020 Soundquest Music)
- Into the Majestic (2021 Timeroom Editions 49)
- As It Is (2021)
- Zones, Drones & Atmospheres (2022)
- What Remains (2022)
- Rest of Life (2023)
- Sanctuary of Desire (2023)
- Integration Being (2023)
- One Day of Forever (2024)
- Reflections in Repose (2024)
- Portals & Spirals (2025)
- The Reverent Sky (2025)

=== Live albums ===
- Stormwarning: Live in Concert (1989 Soundquest)
- All is Now: Steve Roach Live 2002 (2002)
- Storm Surge: Live at NEARfest (2006)
- Landmass (2008 Timeroom Editions)
- Live at Grace Cathedral (2010) – 2 discs
- Live at SoundQuest Fest (2011)
- Journey of One: The Tribal Ambient Era Live 1996 (2011) – 2 discs
- Ultra Immersion Concert (2013)
- Live Transmission (2013) – 2 discs
- Live in Tucson 2000 (2013)
- At the Edge of Everything (2013)
- Alive in the Vortex (2015 Timeroom Editions 35) – 2 discs
- Live in Tucson: Pinnacle Moments (2016 Timeroom Editions 37)
- The Sky Opens (2020)
- Live at SoundQuest Fest 2021 (2021 Timeroom Editions 50)

=== Compilations ===
- Quiet Music (1988 Fortuna) -compilation 1-3 CD
- Now / Traveler (1992 Fortuna) -compilation 1-2 CD
- The Lost Pieces (1993 Rubicon) -CD (re-released on Projekt 1995)
- Truth & Beauty: The Lost Pieces Volume Two (1999 Timeroom Editions 2)
- Dreaming... Now, Then: A Retrospective 1982–1997 (1999 Fortuna) – 2 discs
- Quiet Music: Complete Edition (1999 Fortuna) – 2 discs, re-release of 1988 CD
- Time of the Earth (2001) – DVD
- Pure Flow (2001)
- Day Out of Time (2002)
- Space and Time: An Introduction to the Soundworlds of Steve Roach (2003 Projekt)
- Texture Maps: The Lost Pieces Vol. 3 (2003 Timeroom Editions)
- Places Beyond: The Lost Pieces 4 (2004 Timeroom Editions)
- Quiet Music: The Original 3–Hour Collection (2011) – 3 discs
- Rasa Dance: The Music of Connection (2013)
- The Desert Collection: Volume One (2014)
- The Skeleton Collection 2005 – 2015 (2015 Timeroom Editions)
- Bloodmoon Rising: The Complete 5–Hour Collection (2015 Timeroom Editions 34)

=== Collaboration albums ===
- Moebius (1979) – as a member of the group Moebius
- Western Spaces (1987 Fortuna) – with Kevin Braheny
- The Leaving Time (1988) – with Michael Shrieve
- Desert Solitaire (1989 Fortuna) – with Michael Stearns and Kevin Braheny
- Strata (1990 Hearts of Space Records) – with Robert Rich
- Australia: Sound of the Earth (1990 Fortuna) – with David Hudson and Sarah Hopkins
- Soma (1992 Hearts of Space Records) – with Robert Rich
- Ritual Ground (1993) – with Elmar Schulte as Solitaire
- Forgotten Gods (1993 Hearts of Space) – with Jorge Reyes & Suso Saiz as Suspended Memories
- Earth Island (1994) – with Jorge Reyes & Suso Saiz as Suspended Memories
- Kiva (1995 Fathom/Hearts of Space Records) – with Michael Stearns and Ron Sunsinger
- Well of Souls (1995) – 2 discs, with Vidna Obmana
- Halcyon Days (1996) – with Stephen Kent and Kenneth Newby
- Cavern of Sirens (1997) – with Vidna Obmana
- Dust to Dust (1998) – with Roger King
- Ascension of Shadows: Meditations for the Millennium (1999) – 3 discs, with Vidna Obmana (re-released in 2005 and 2008 as three separate albums)
- Body Electric (1999) – with Vir Unis
- Vine ~ Bark & Spore (2000) – with Jorge Reyes
- Circles & Artifacts (2000) – with Vidna Obmana
- Live Archive (2000) – with Vidna Obmana
- The Serpent's Lair (2000) – 2 discs, with Byron Metcalf
- Prayers to the Protector (2000) – with Thupten Pema Lama
- Blood Machine (2001) – with Vir Unis
- InnerZone (2002) – with Vidna Obmana
- Trance Spirits (2002) – with Jeffrey Fayman, Robert Fripp & Momodou Kah
- Wachuma's Wave (2003) - with Byron Metcalf & Mark Seelig
- Spirit Dome (2004 Projekt) – with Vidna Obmana
- Mantram (2004 Projekt) – with Byron Metcalf and Mark Seelig
- The Shaman's Heart (2005) – with Byron Metcalf
- Somewhere Else (Ascension of Shadows I) (2005) – with Vidna Obmana
- Terraform (2006) – with Loren Nerell (reissued in 2009)
- The Memory Pool (Ascension of Shadows II) (2008) – with Vidna Obmana
- Revealing the Secret (Ascension of Shadows III) (2008) – with Vidna Obmana
- Nada Terma (2008) – with Byron Metcalf and Mark Seelig
- Spirit Dome – Live Archive (2009) – 2 discs, with Vidna Obmana
- Stream of Thought (2009) – with Erik Wøllo
- Dream Tracker (2010) – with Byron Metcalf and Dashmesh Khalsa
- Nightbloom (2010) – with Mark Seelig
- Into the Deep: America, Whaling & The World Original Soundtrack (2010) – with Brian Keane
- The Desert Inbetween (2011) – with Brian Parnham
- The Road Eternal (2011) – with Erik Wøllo
- The Shaman's Heart II: The Healing Journey (2011) – with Byron Metcalf
- Low Volume Music (2012) – with Dirk Serries
- Tales from the Ultra Tribe (2012) – with Byron Metcalf
- Copper: Original Soundtrack (2013) – with Brian Keane
- The Long Night (2014) – with Kelly David
- The Ancestor Circle (2014) – with Jorge Reyes
- Monuments of Ecstasy (2015) – with Byron Metcalf & Rob Thomas
- Biosonic (2016) – with Robert Logan
- Second Nature (2016) – with Robert Logan
- POV (2019) – with Miles Richmond & Peter Grenader also known as POV (band)
- Tales From The Ultra Tribe with Byron Metcalf (2019)
- Nectar Meditation (2020 Timeroom Editions 48) - with Serena Gabriel
