= Low Volume Music =

Studio album by Steve Roach and Dirk Serries
- Released: July 17, 2012
- Genre: Ambient
- Length: 58:42
- Label: Projekt
- Producer: Steve Roach and Dirk Serries

Steve Roach chronology
Back to Life (2012)	Low Volume Music (2012)	Soul Tones (2012)

Professional ratings
Review scores
Source	Rating
Allmusic	4/5 stars
Hypnagogue	favorable
Musique Machine	5/5 stars

Low Volume Music is the sixth collaborative album by ambient musicians Steve Roach and Dirk Serries (formerly recording as vidnaObmana or Vidna Obmana). It was their first album after a ten-year hiatus following the release of InnerZone in 2002.

== Reception ==
AllMusic rated the album a 4 of 5, saying "their work is remarkable, and with Low Volume Music they created yet another standout in 2012".

Hypnagogue praise the album, comparing with Quiet Music and Structures from Silence, concluded "Leave this on repeat for hours. It’s thinking music, it’s sleeping music, it’s being music. Roach and Serries have returned with a disc that sets a fresh standard in the ambient landscape".

== Track listing ==
All tracks are written by Steve Roach and Dirk Serries.

No.	Title	Length
1.	"Here"	8:01
2.	"Whisper"	12:44
3.	"Closed"	8:12
4.	"Bow"	14:28
5.	"Haze"	15:14

== Personnel ==
Adapted from Discogs

- Dirk Serries, Steve Roach – concept, music, producer
- Sam Rosenthal – graphic design
- Martina Verhoeven – photography
