= The Desert Inbetween =

Studio album by Steve Roach and Brian Parnham
- Released: January 11, 2011
- Studio: The Floating Point Studio and The Timeroom
- Genre: Ambient
- Length: 66:45
- Label: Projekt
- Producer: Steve Roach and Brian Parnham

Steve Roach chronology
Nightbloom (2010)	The Desert Inbetween (2011)	Immersion Five - Circadian Rhythms (2011)

Professional ratings
Review scores
Source	Rating
Allmusic	3.5/5 stars
Guts of Darkness	(in French)
Hypnagogue	favorable
Musique Machine	4/5 stars

The Desert Inbetween is the collaborative album by ambient musicians Steve Roach and Brian Parnham, containing Southwest surroundings.

== Reception ==
AllMusic rated the album a 3.5 of 5, stating "The Desert Inbetween is almost a natural outgrowth of their individual approaches".

Hypnagogue highly rated the album, saying "It is a richly dimensional concatenation of purposeful sounds that ricochet in rhythm around each other to create the space as they go, every one of them integral".

== Track listing ==
All tracks are written by Steve Roach and Brian Parnham.

No.	Title	Length
1.	"Opening Sky"	11:03
2.	"Ancestral Passage"	9:19
3.	"Serpent Gulch"	11:11
4.	"Somewhere Between"	7:13
5.	"Spirit Passage"	4:14
6.	"Return to the Underground"	17:14
7.	"When the Raven Flies"	6:31

== Personnel ==
Adapted from Discogs

- Michał Karcz – cover images
- Sam Rosenthal – graphic design
- Steve Roach – composer, arranger, recorder, producer, mastering, electric guitar, synthesizer, electronics, waterphone, sounds, ocarina, percussion
- Brian Parnham – composer, arranger, recorder, producer, synthesizer, didgeridoo, udu, shaker, sounds, engineer, bass guitar, percussion, other trace elements
