= Landmass (album) =

Live album by Steve Roach
- Released: August 1, 2008
- Recorded: at WXPN (88.5 FM), Philadelphia, PA
- Genre: Ambient
- Length: 66:58
- Label: Timeroom Editions
- Producer: Steve Roach

Steve Roach chronology
A Deeper Silence (2008)	Landmass (2008)	Nada Terma (2008)

Professional ratings
Review scores
Source	Rating
e/i Magazine	(positive)
Heathen Harvest	(positive)
Musique Machine	4/5 stars
Tokafi	(positive)

Landmass (2008) is an album by the American ambient musician Steve Roach.

== Production ==
The tracks on Landmass were recorded on May 20, 2007, live on the Star's End radio program in Philadelphia, Pennsylvania. Only a few hours after Steve Roach had given a concert at the Episcopal Church at Penn, his equipment was moved to the WXPN studio where, beginning a little after two in the morning, Roach performed and created each track. The sounds, themes, and sonic "sub-structures" were prepared ahead of time, and the tracks were later edited for length prior to their release.

== Release ==
Landmass was chosen to be the 20th release on Steve Roach's Timeroom Editions label, which also celebrated its 10th anniversary in 2008.

== Track listing ==
No.	Title	Length
1.	"Transmigration"	15:31
2.	"Cerulean Blue Sky Over a Seared Desert Wasteland"	15:36
3.	"Monuments of Memory"	11:22
4.	"Alluvial Plain"	9:46
5.	"Trancemigration"	7:52
6.	"Stars Begin"	6:51

== Personnel ==
- Steve Roach (synthesizers)
