= Body Electric (album) =

Studio album by Steve Roach and Vir Unis
- Released: 1999
- Genre: Ambient
- Length: 56:54
- Label: Projekt Records
- Producer: Steve Roach and Vir Unis

Steve Roach chronology
Dreaming... Now, Then: A Retrospective 1982-1997 (1999)	Body Electric (1999)	Quiet Music: Complete Edition (1999)

Vir Unis chronology
Imaginarium (1998)	Body Electric (1999)	The Drift Inside (1999)

Professional ratings
Review scores
Source	Rating
Allmusic	4.5/5 stars
Alternative Press	favorable
Progressive World	4/5 stars

Body Electric is a collaborative album by ambient artists Steve Roach and Vir Unis. The music is a unique blend of smooth ambient textures, techno rhythms and various acoustic and natural recordings.

The artwork on the album was created by computer artist Steven Rooke. Instead of a booklet, this CD comes with four cards. The first card contains the front cover and on the reverse side the liner notes while the other three cards feature a panel of artwork on each side.

== Track listing ==
1. "Born of Fire" – 9:12
2. "Pure Expansion" – 10:16
3. "Mind Link" – 7:07
4. "Gene Pool" – 5:40
5. "Synaptic Gap" – 1:56
6. "Homunculus Within" – 4:15
7. "Bloodstreaming" – 3:10
8. "Solar Tribe" – 4:13
9. "The New Dream" – 3:58
10. "Cave of the Heart" – 7:00

== Personnel ==
- Steve Roach – analog and digital synthesizers, percussion, voice, treatments
- Vir Unis – synthesizers, treatments
- Omar Faruk Tekbilek – ney (on "Born of Fire")
- Roger King – bass (on "Born of Fire" and "The New Dream"), EBow guitar (on "Born of Fire")
- Linda Kohanov – voices (on "Pure Expansion")
