= Texture Maps: The Lost Pieces Vol. 3 =

Compilation album by Steve Roach
- Released: 2003
- Recorded: 1987–2003
- Genre: Ambient
- Length: 73:32
- Label: Timeroom Editions
- Producer: Steve Roach

Steve Roach chronology
Space and Time: An Introduction to the Soundworlds of Steve Roach (2003)	Texture Maps: The Lost Pieces Vol. 3 (2003)	Life Sequence (2003)

Professional ratings
Review scores
Source	Rating
Allmusic	3/5 stars

Texture Maps: The Lost Pieces Vol.3 (2003) is an album by the American ambient musician Steve Roach.

This album is more stylistically coherent than the previous Lost Pieces albums. It consists of subtle, dark, purely electronic textures similar to The Magnificent Void and Mystic Chords & Sacred Spaces.

The first track “Gray and Purple” was recorded in the same week as the track “Looking for Safety” from Dreamtime Return. The track “Artifact Ghost” was used as a background for some of the rhythmic atmospheres on Artifacts and Well of Souls, as well as several live concerts from around that time. Its original 90 minute version was looped at low volume in continuous playback for several days at Roach’s home.

== Track listing ==
1. ”Gray and Purple” – 21:14
  (Recorded in 1987. Previously unreleased.)
2. ”Artifact Ghost” – 8:46
  (Recorded in 1993. Featured in Artifacts and Well of Souls.)
3. ”Spiral Triptych” – 15:24
  (Recorded in 2001. Previously unreleased)
4. (Same as above.)
5. (Same as above.)
6. "Bottomless 2" – 7:03
  (Recorded in 1999. Alternate mix of a track released on the multi artist compilation Weightless, Effortless, 1999.)
7. ”Quiet Sun” – 5:29
  (Recorded in 2003. Previously unreleased.)
8. ”Soul Light” – 15:09
  (Same as track 7.)
