= Destination Beyond =

Studio album by Steve Roach
- Released: September 29, 2009
- Recorded: at The Timeroom in Tucson, Arizona
- Genre: Ambient
- Length: 71:41
- Label: Projekt Records
- Producer: Steve Roach

Steve Roach chronology
Dynamic Stillness (2009)	Destination Beyond (2009)	Afterlight (2009)

Audio sample
- "Destination Beyond": file; help

Professional ratings
Review scores
Source	Rating
Allmusic	4/5 stars
MusicTap	4/5 stars

Destination Beyond is an album by the American ambient musician Steve Roach, released in 2009. Roach infuses his signature atmospheric fabric of sound with a springy, trance-like groove reminiscent of the rhythm found in Arc of Passion.

== Concept ==
As the title implies, Destination Beyond is a meditation on motion and the infinite point on the horizon that can never be reached. The album includes a small introspection on this theme. Roach writes that the "magnetic pull and drive towards the point on the horizon, towards the destination beyond . . . remains a constant theme and impetus in my life."

== Production ==
Destination Beyond was created with analog synthesizers using real-time processing to produce a "pure natural flow."

== Track listing ==
No.	Title	Length
1.	"Destination Beyond"	71:41

== Personnel ==
- Steve Roach – synthesizers, additional photography
- Murray Bolesta – cover images
- Sam Rosenthal – layout

== See also ==
- Ambient music
- Electronic music
