= POV (band) =

American Ambient band

- Origin: United States
- Genres: Ambient
- Instruments: analog and digital synthesizers, electric guitar
- Labels: ZSR Records
- Website: Official Website

POV (Point Of View) is an American Ambient music band consisting of Miles Richmond (guitars), Peter Grenader (analog and digital electronics / synthesizers), and Steve Roach (synthesizers).

POV's guest artists include Thighpaulsandra of Coil, Julian Cope and Spiritualized on piano, Theo Travis of King Crimson, Gong (band) and Soft Machine on alto flutes, and Martin Shellard, who previously worked with Spiritualized and Elizabeth Fraser, on guitar.

== Artistry ==
POV's musical influences are American minimalism and experimental ambient. They expand upon a process introduced by Brian Eno and Robert Fripp in the 1973 release No Pussyfooting, in which the majority of the material consists of guitar with accompanying electronic drones, constructed of additional guitar information, which has been processed via a modular synthesizer, equipped with both standard and granular sampling capabilities.

== Discography ==
- POV, ZSR Records, 2019
- POV 2: The Case For Square Waves While Searching For Happy Accidents, ZSR Records, 2020
