= Immersion: Three =

Studio album by Steve Roach
- Released: June 5, 2007
- Recorded: at the Timeroom in Tucson, Arizona
- Genres: Ambient, electronic
- Length: 220:22
- Label: Projekt Records
- Producer: Steve Roach

Steve Roach chronology
Fever Dreams III (2007)	Immersion: Three (2007)	Arc of Passion (2008)

Audio sample
- "First Light": file; help

Immersion Series chronology
Immersion: Two (2006)	Immersion: Three (2007)	Immersion: Four (2009)

Immersion: Three is a 3-disc album by the American ambient musician Steve Roach, released in 2007. It is the third album in the Immersion series.

== Overview ==
Immersion: Three is a set of three long-form pieces, each released on its own disc, created for purposes where "traditional music could be considered invasive." The compositions stemmed from Steve Roach's contemplation of hypnagogia and self-exploration.

The album is released in an eight-panel Digipak book. The Immersion series was continued with Immersion: Four (2009) and Immersion Five: Circadian Rhythms (2011).

== Reception ==
Professional ratings
Review scores
Source	Rating
Allmusic	4/5 stars
Musique Machine	3/5 stars
Tokafi	(generally positive)

== Track listing ==
Disc One
No.	Title	Length
1.	"First Light"	73:31

Disc Two
No.	Title	Length
1.	"Sleep Chamber"	73:14

Disc Three
No.	Title	Length
1.	"Still"	73:37

== Personnel ==
- Steve Roach (synthesizers)
