= Jeffrey Fayman =

American composer; founder of Immediate Music

Jeffrey Fayman is an American percussionist and composer, best known for his soundtrack work.

== Biography ==
In 1977, Fayman drummed in Peter Banks' Empire band, the sessions appearing on the archival Mark II release in 1997.

Fayman has collaborated with King Crimson's Robert Fripp on various occasions, starting with the 2000 album A Temple In The Clouds,. Following that release, Fripp performed as a guest on the Steve Roach & Jeffrey Fayman release Trance Spirits (2002). A later collaboration between Fayman and Fripp was The Human Experimente, re-interpreting early King Crimson music. A single of "21st Century Schizoid Man" was released in 2009 and work was reportedly ongoing on an album, also with Billy Sherwood.

Fayman works for Immediate Music and is a member of Globus with Yoav Goren.
