= Afterlight (album) =

Studio album by Steve Roach
- Released: August 1, 2009
- Recorded: at The Timeroom in Tucson, Arizona
- Genre: Ambient
- Length: 73:54
- Label: Timeroom Editions
- Producer: Steve Roach

Steve Roach chronology
Destination Beyond (2009)	Afterlight (2009)	Immersion : Four (2009)

Audio sample
- file; help

Afterlight (2009) is an album by the American ambient musician Steve Roach.

== Production ==
Afterlight was created in the spring of 2009 over a period of several months. Steve Roach kept the piece in continual low-volume playback during periods of repose or contemplation. Roach would then modify and refine Afterlight into the flowing soundscape released to the public.

Afterlight can be considered a sequel to Dynamic Stillness: its creation originated immediately upon the completion of the latter album; a quote inside the album artwork reads, "after the stillness...comes the afterlight"; and both albums feature stark landscape-themed artwork created by Michal Karcz.

Steve Roach deems Afterlight to be a companion piece to the two other long-form releases, Destination Beyond and Immersion : Four, which were composed within the same timeframe, released within the same 24-hour period, and are interconnected in their "pursuit of timelessness."

== Album artwork ==
The photographs used in the artwork were created by Michal Karcz, known for his use of desaturation and narrow range of hues. The Digipak album opens flat, connecting the images, resulting in widescreen landscapes on the inside and reverse side of the album. The artwork layout was realized by Sam Rosenthal.

== Track listing ==
No.	Title	Length
1.	"Afterlight"	73:54

== Personnel ==
- Steve Roach – synthesizers
- Michal Karcz – cover images
- Sam Rosenthal – layout
