= Truth & Beauty: The Lost Pieces Volume Two =

Compilation album by Steve Roach
- Released: 1999
- Recorded: 1987–1998
- Genre: Ambient
- Length: 71:46
- Label: Timeroom Editions
- Producer: Steve Roach

Steve Roach chronology
Dust to Dust (1998)	Truth & Beauty: The Lost Pieces Volume Two (1999)	Atmospheric Conditions (1999)

Professional ratings
Review scores
Source	Rating
Allmusic	4/5 stars
Progressive World	5/5 stars

Truth & Beauty: The Lost Pieces Volume Two (1999) is a compilation album by the American ambient musician Steve Roach. Like the first Lost Pieces, this album is a collection of pieces that were either temporally lost in Steve Roach’s archive of recording or released on limited edition, multi artist compilations.

== Track listing ==
1. ”Aftermath” – 9:11
  (Originally released on the Spanish edition of Stormwarning, 1992.)
2. ”The Majestic Void” – 5:36
  (Originally released on Klem Electronische Muziek 1994, 1994.)
3. ”Fall of Moai” – 1:53
  (Recorded in 1993, Earth Island era. Previously unreleased.)
4. ”Earthman” – 9:44
  (With Suso Saiz. Same as track 3)
5. ”Fate Awaits” – 4:22
  (Same as track 4)
6. ”Beyond the Blood” – 5:15
  (Recorded in 1994, Artifacts era. Additional voices added in 1998. Previously unreleased.)
7. ”Before the Sacrifice” – 6:54
  (Originally released on Twilight Earth, 1994.)
8. ”The Unreachable Place (Again)” – 9:38
  (Recorded in 1987, Dreamtime Return era. Previously unreleased.)
9. ”The Unbroken Promise” – 7:51
  (Originally released on The Promises of Silence, 1993.)
10. ”This and the Other” – 11:15
  (Originally released on Soundscape Gallery Series One, 1996.)
