= Terraform (Steve Roach and Loren Nerell album) =

Studio album by Steve Roach and Loren Nerell
- Released: May 15, 2006
- Genre: Ambient
- Length: 73:46
- Label: Projekt
- Producer: Steve Roach

Steve Roach chronology
New Life Dreaming (2005)	Terraform (2006)	Proof Positive (2006)

Professional ratings
Review scores
Source	Rating
Tokafi	positive

Terraform is the collaborative album by ambient musicians Steve Roach and Loren Nerell, who became friends in 1982 in Los Angeles. After years, they decided to create an organic, surreal and ambient soundscape environments. Mixed and structured at the Timeroom. Originally released on Soleilmoon Recordings in 2006 as a limited edition DVD-sized Digipak with 3 postcards. It was later released in 2009 on Projekt in a traditional jewel case.

== Track listing ==
No.	Title	Length
1.	"Cavity of Liquids"	18:32
2.	"Ecopoiesis"	14:24
3.	"Texture Wall"	28:03
4.	"Paraterra"	12:47

== Personnel ==
Adapted from Discogs

- Brian Parnham – photography
- Steve Roach – producer
- Loren Nerell, Steve Roach – creating
