= Australia: Sound of the Earth =

Studio album by Steve Roach, David Hudson and Sarah Hopkins
- Released: 1990
- Length: 62:51
- Label: Fortuna/Celestial Harmonies
- Producer: Steve Roach

Steve Roach chronology
Strata (1990)	Australia: Sound of the Earth (1990)	World's Edge (1992)

David Hudson chronology
Touching the Sounds of Australia (1988)	Australia: Sound of the Earth (1991)	Woolunda (1993)

Professional ratings
Review scores
Source	Rating
Allmusic	3/5 stars

Australia: Sound of the Earth is a 1991 album from Steve Roach, documenting Roach's second trip to Australia. David Hudson's didgeridoo and cellist Sarah Hopkins were also featured.

== Track listing ==
1. ”Red Dust and Sweat” - 10:46
2. ”Call to Kuranda” - 3:15
3. ”The Ancient Voice” - 3:10
4. ”Atmosphere for Dreaming” - 7:52
5. ”Darktime - The Initiation” - 7:13
6. ”Origin” - 4:48
7. ”Spirits” -3:20
8. ”The Hunter” - 3:03
9. ”Awakening Earth” - 14:10
10. ”Land Sound - The Dreaming Place” - 5:14
