= Dynamic Stillness =

Studio album by Steve Roach
- Released: May 5, 2009
- Recorded: at The Timeroom in Tucson, Arizona
- Genre: Ambient
- Length: 145:49
- Label: Projekt Records
- Producer: Steve Roach

Steve Roach chronology
Spirit Dome – Live Archive (2009)	Dynamic Stillness (2009)	Destination Beyond (2009)

Audio sample
- "Slowly Revealed": file; help

Professional ratings
Review scores
Source	Rating
Allmusic	4/5 stars
Darkroom Magazine	(6.5/10) (in Italian)
Echoes	(positive)
Guts of Darkness	(in French)
MusicTap	4/5 stars

Dynamic Stillness is a 2-disc album by the American ambient musician Steve Roach, released in 2009.

== Production ==
Dynamic Stillness is composed of pieces created in solitude over a period of three years. The resulting pieces emote the slow, powerful energies of expanding cloud formations and the silence of the sprawling land beneath.

Immediately after the release of Dynamic Stillness, Steve Roach commenced with a continuation of the atmospheric theme, creating the long-form piece, Afterlight.

== Album artwork ==
The photographs used in the artwork were created by Michal Karcz, whose imagery is nearly achromatic in nature. The six-panel digipack album opens to reveal stark imagery of perfect desolation beneath foreboding clouds. This magnificent contrast is, of course, observed in the album's title.

The artwork played an integral part in the creation of the music. Steve Roach and Michal Karcz traded music and artwork for nearly two years. Roach's pieces evolved with the imagery, as Karcz's graphic work evolved with the music, resulting in one of the most integrated releases of Roach's career.

== Track listing ==
All music is composed by Steve Roach.

Disc One
No.	Title	Length
1.	"Birth of Still Places"	40:28
2.	"Long Tide"	19:41
3.	"A Darker Light"	7:34
4.	"Opening Sky"	5:06

Disc Two
No.	Title	Length
1.	"Nature of Things"	8:50
2.	"Further Inside"	16:58
3.	"Slowly Revealed"	23:55
4.	"Canyon Stillness"	23:17

== Personnel ==
- Steve Roach – synthesizers
- Michal Karcz – cover images
- Sam Rosenthal – mastering

== See also ==
- Ambient music
- Electronic music
