= Erik Wøllo =

Norwegian composer

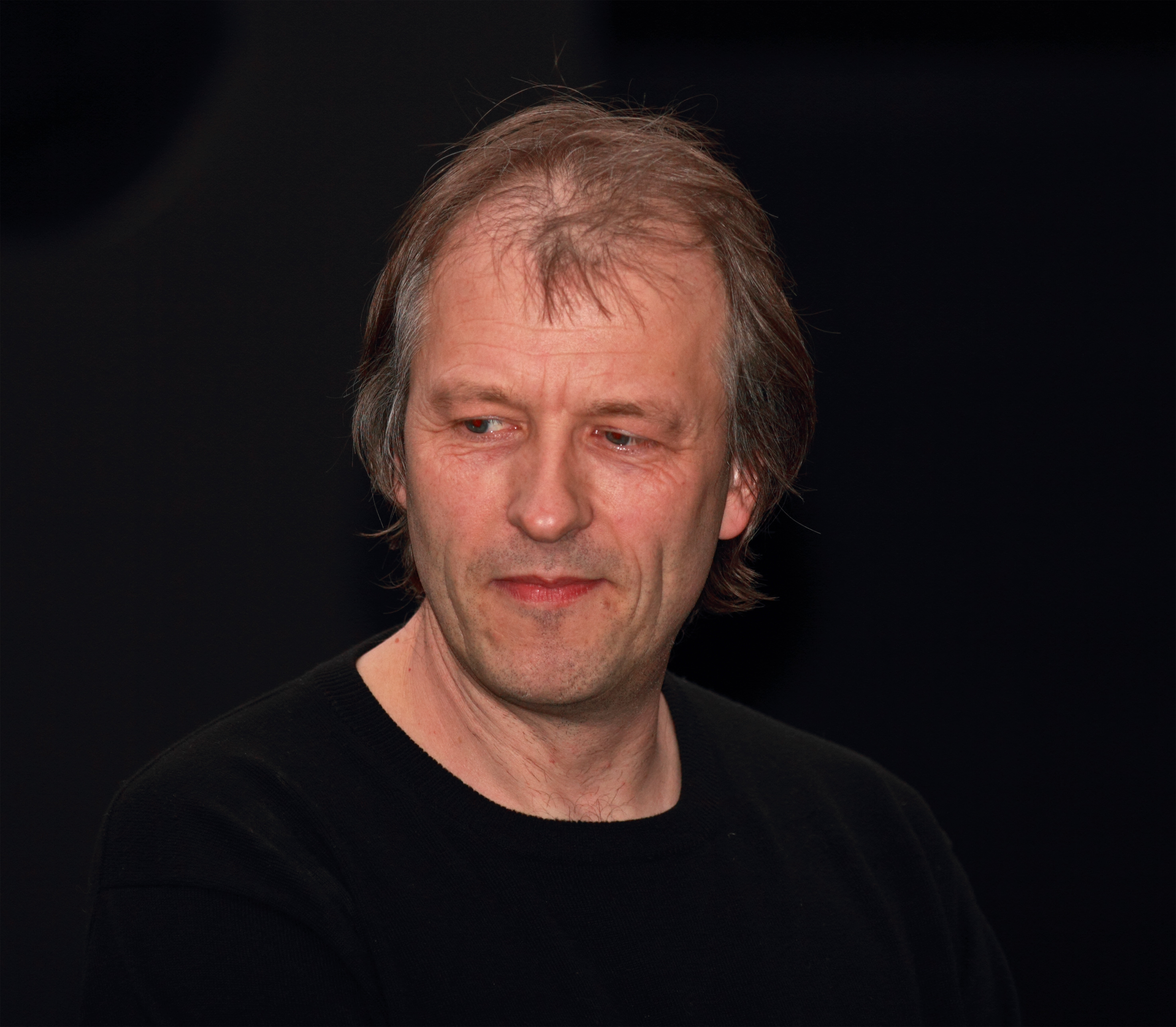
- Wøllo at Schallwelle 2012.

Background information
- Born: 6 January 1961 (age 65); Hemsedal, Norway
- Genres: Ambient music, electronic music, minimalist music, space music, drone music
- Occupations: Composer, musician, record producer
- Instruments: Guitar, Keyboards
- Years active: 1980–present
- Label: Projekt
- Website: www.wollo.com

Erik Wøllo (born 6 January 1961) is a Norwegian composer and musician, guitarist and synthesist. He has a background in various genres in music. As a solo recording artist, he is most known for his electronic and ambient musical soundscapes. Music that can be classified in the genres of space, drone, new age, and electronic music. Through his many albums he has gained recognition for his unique sound and style. Using guitar as the primary instrument in a highly imaginary and emotional music, building a bridge between grand symphonic realms and gentle, minimalistic and serene atmospheres.

== History and overview ==
Born and raised in Hemsedal, Norway. In the era when he grew up in Norway, the local folk music is very much dominated by the Hardanger fiddle, and his grandfather once offered him a fiddle as a birthday present, if he wanted to start playing. But he went for the guitar, and started to play at age 11.

His first influence was the evolving heavy/progressive rock music in the seventies, although he once said his first guitar hero was John Fogerty. He soon discovered the more complicated and intricate styles of rock, like Pink Floyd, Yes and Emerson Lake and Palmer. Which led him gradually into more contemporary electronic music genres.

He started his professional career in 1980, playing and touring around Norway in various jazz/rock and fusion bands. But in 1984, he decided to concentrate full-time on his own solo career, building his own studio Wintergarden, where he started to explore and create his new soundworld.

His third album "Traces" (1985), was a turning point in his creative musical approach, and pointed out his unique style in instrumental music. This album represented an important and seminal time for Wøllo's artistic development.

Erik says in a private interview: “I quit all the bands I played in, I wanted to work on my own using the modern electronic studio as an instrument. Like a painter with his oil canvasses. I wanted to make a music that had expansive synthesizer textures and sequencer patterns, layered together with expressive melodic electric guitars. Working with depth, time and space. In those years in the early eighties the studio technology was new and revolutionary, and I wanted to explore all the new possibilities. To be able to control the infinite variations of electronic sound, using an endless palette for creative expression. Musically this technology opened up a new possible world for me, and I have continued to further develop and refine these musical ideas on later recordings.

Also for the last decades, I have been able to bring this my musical concept to the stage, performing live. I have been doing several tours, as well as releasing a double CD set live album "Silent Currents" (Projekt, CD-2011). As well as three download live albums "Silent Currents 3" (2013), "Star’s End 2015" (Silent Currents 4), and "Winter Tide" - Live at Soundquest Fest 2021 (Projekt, Digital). I have also done several live concerts with Ian Boddy and Steve Roach. In August 2019, I performed a main act concert with special written music for an outdoor festival in Norway, featuring Trey Gunn, Kouame Sereba and Jerry Marotta."

Erik has also written music for diverse acoustic ensembles, such as string quartets, wind quintets and sinfoniettas. As one of very few Norwegian composers, these scores were all written in the classical minimalistic tradition.

He has released more than 50 solo albums and several smaller format EP's, all distributed globally and he has gained a large audience for his music.

He has received the Schallwelle Award in Germany for "Revolve", for best Ambient album in 2023 (together with Ian Boddy).

== Collaborations ==
Erik Wøllo has also collaborated and released album works together with some of the most respected artists in the ambient music world: with Steve Roach ("Stream of Thought", CD-2009 & "The Road Eternal", CD-2011), Michael Stearns ("Convergence", CD-2020), Ian Boddy ("Frontiers", CD-2012, "EC12", Digital-2014, "Meridian, CD-2018 and "Revolve", CD-2023), Byron Metcalf ("Earth Luminous", CD-2016), Bernhard Wöstheinrich ("Arcadia Borealis", CD-2009 and "Weltenuhr, CD-2014), and several others.

One of the areas Wøllo has been deeply exploring for many decades, is the connections between the various art forms. Focusing on finding mutual and parallel aspects, he has been making music for use together with other media, like film, modern ballet and theater. Also together with diverse experimental visual art forms for gallery exhibitions. (photography, fine art, literature and video art). Wøllo is also a visual artist and have created several album covers, including some of his own releases.

== Personal ==
Erik Wøllo currently lives on Hvaler, an island in the south of Norway. He is married, and has one son.

== Gallery ==
Wøllo with Fender Stratocaster at Schallwelle 2012.

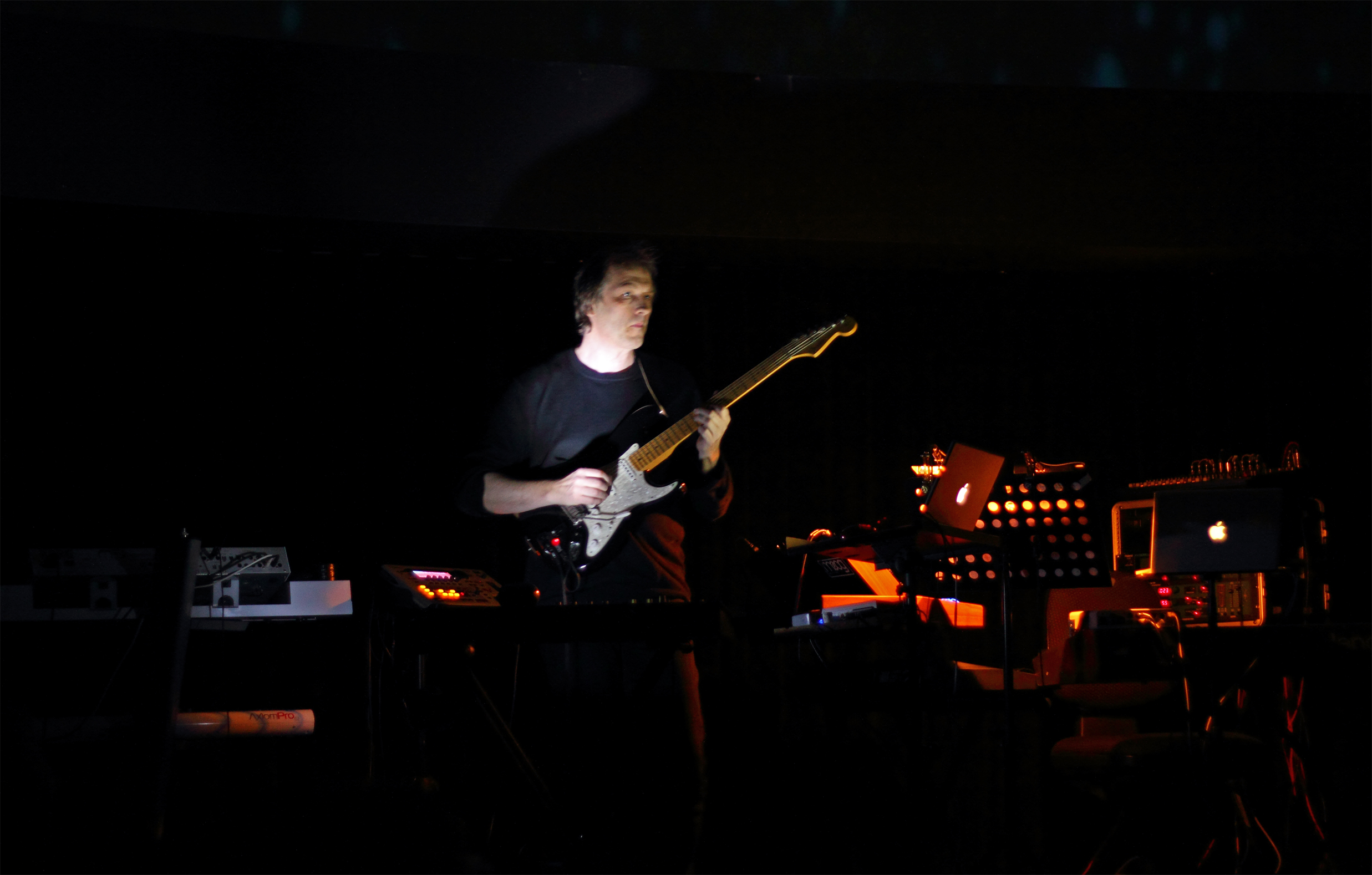

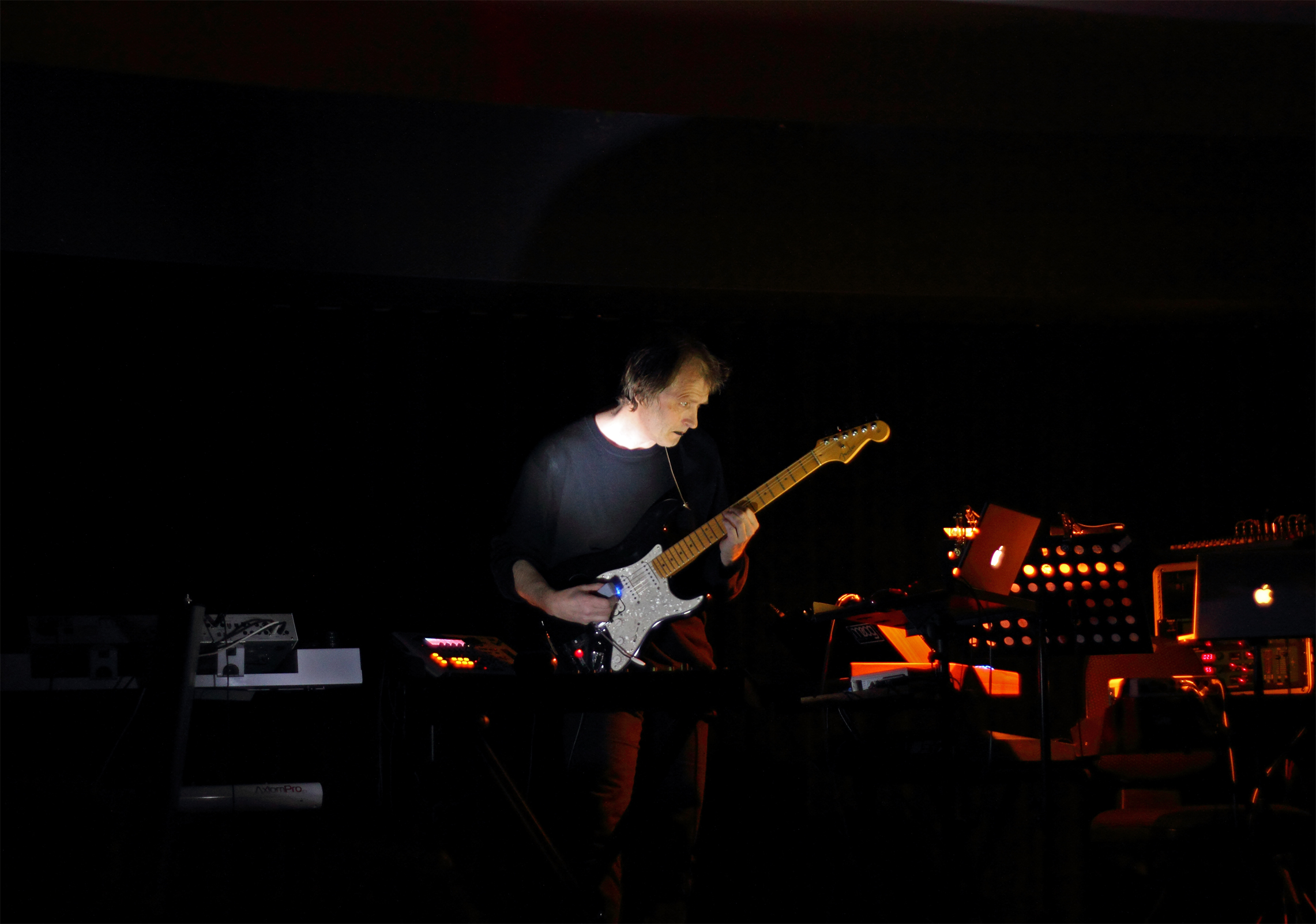

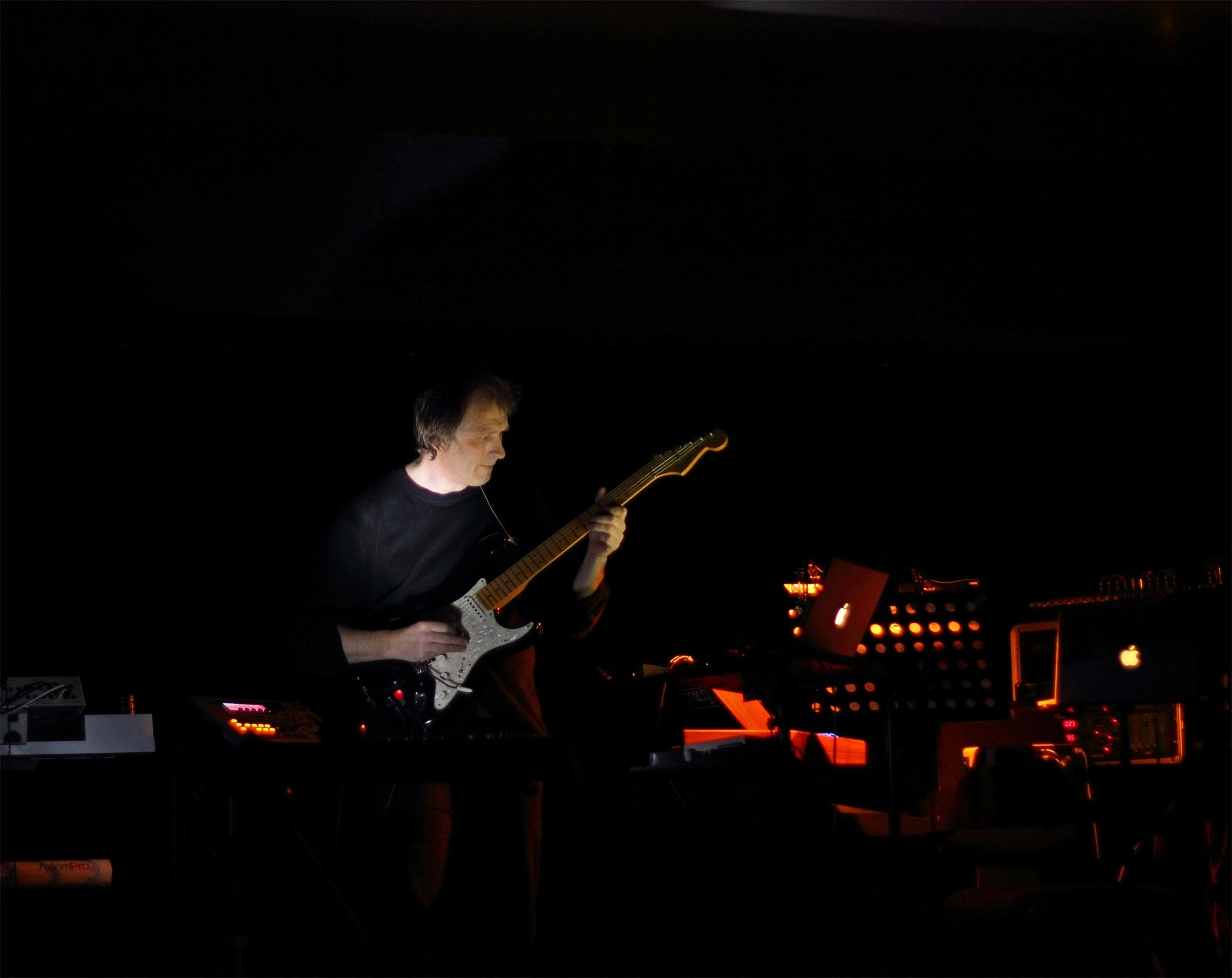

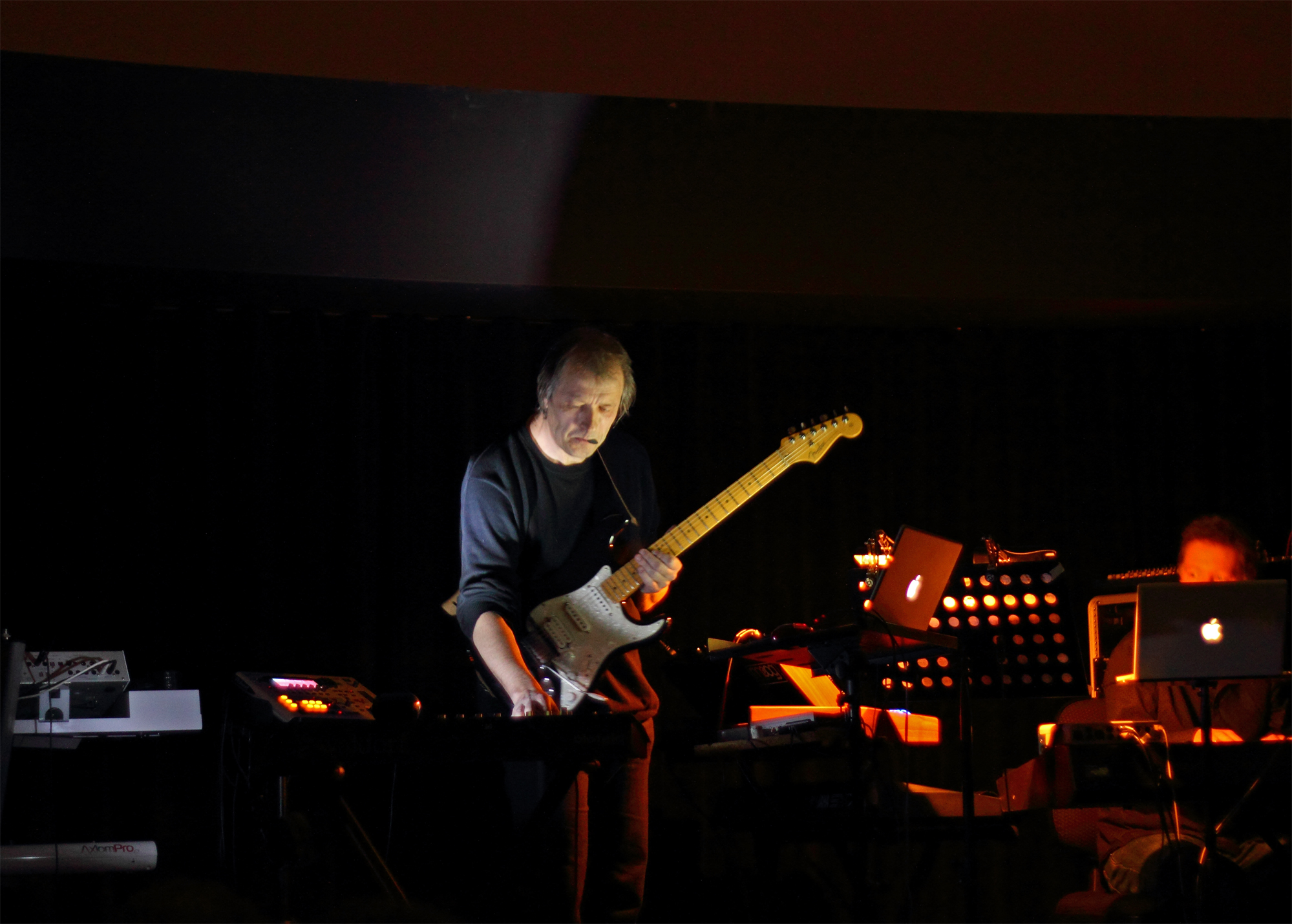

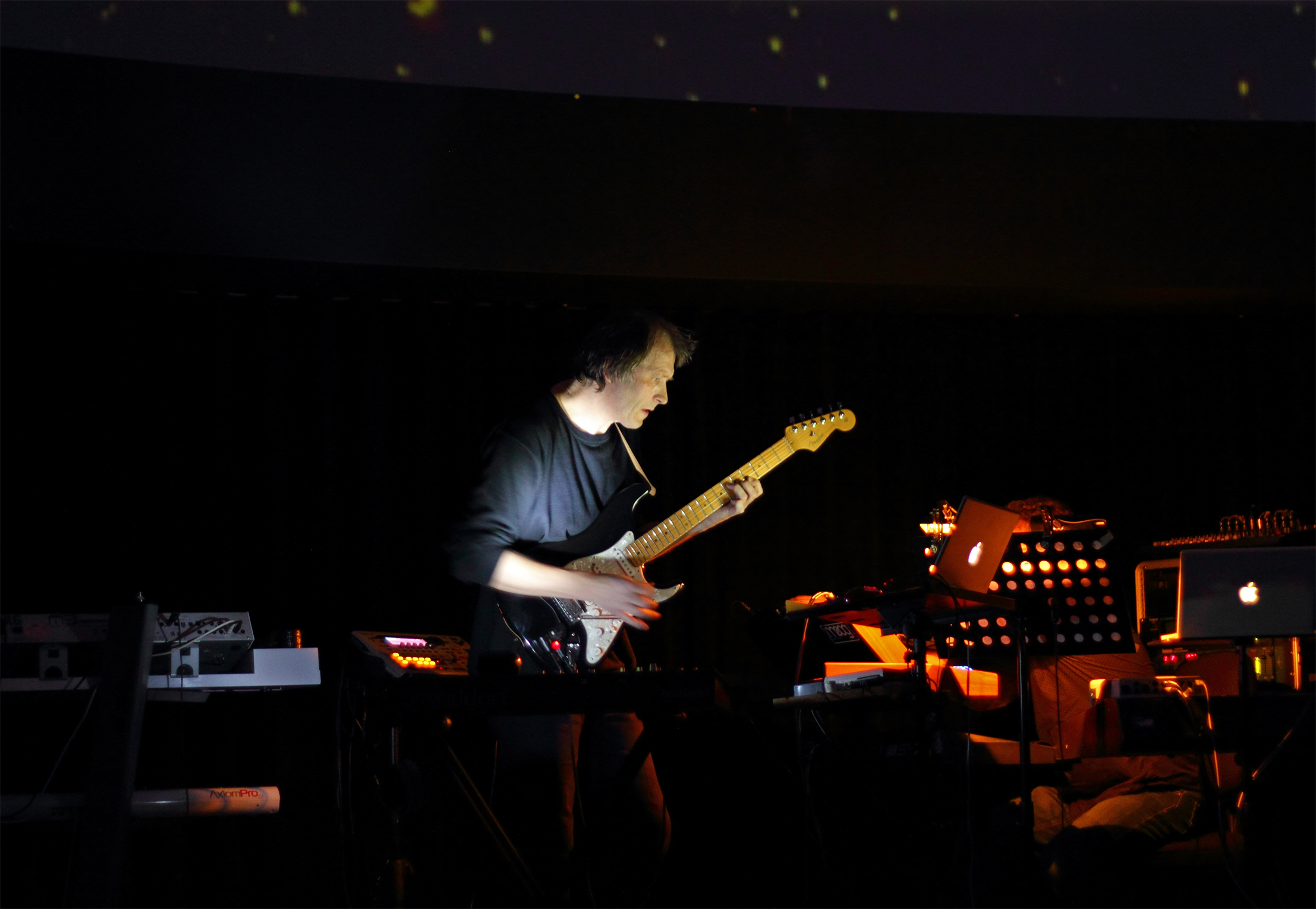

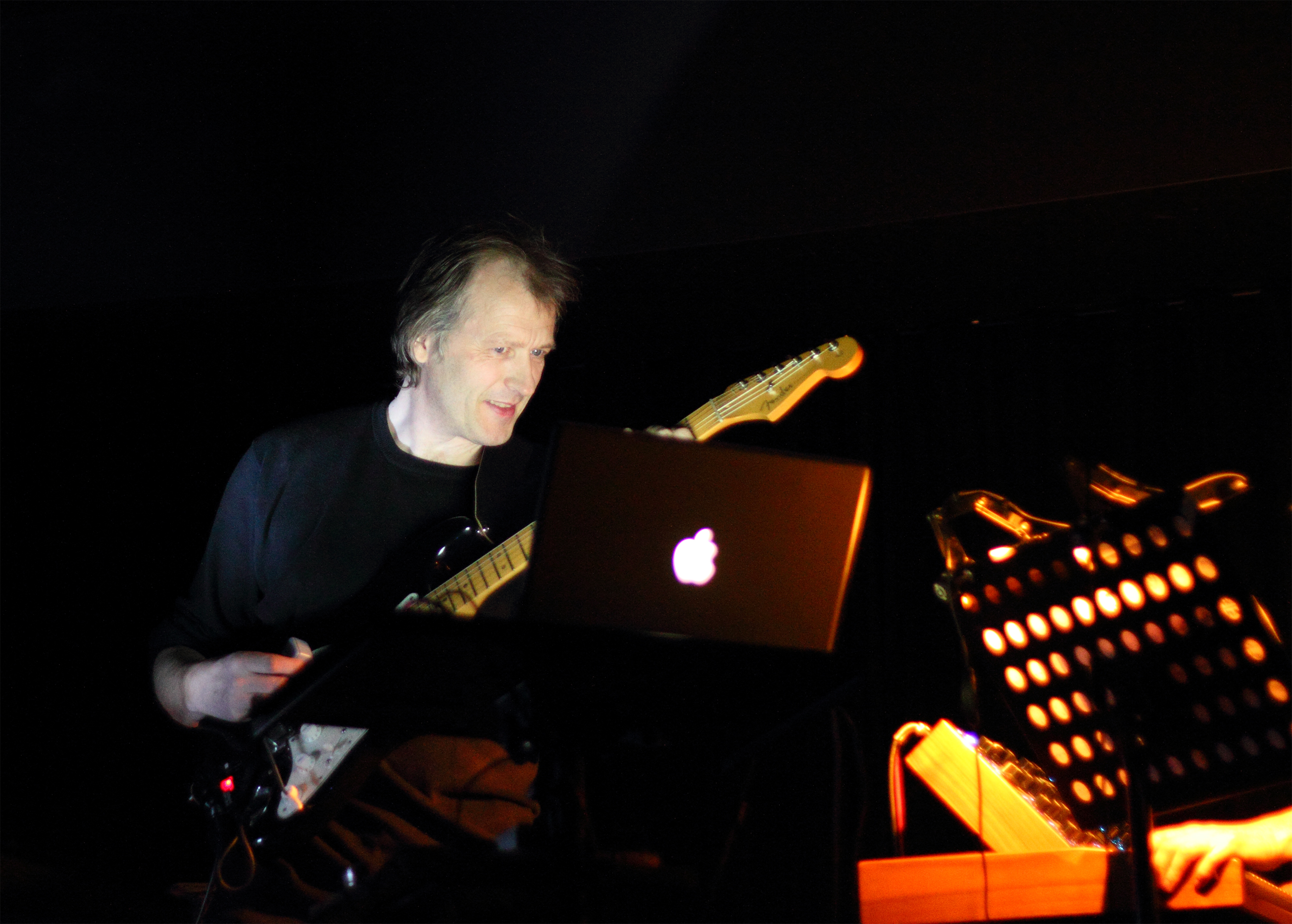

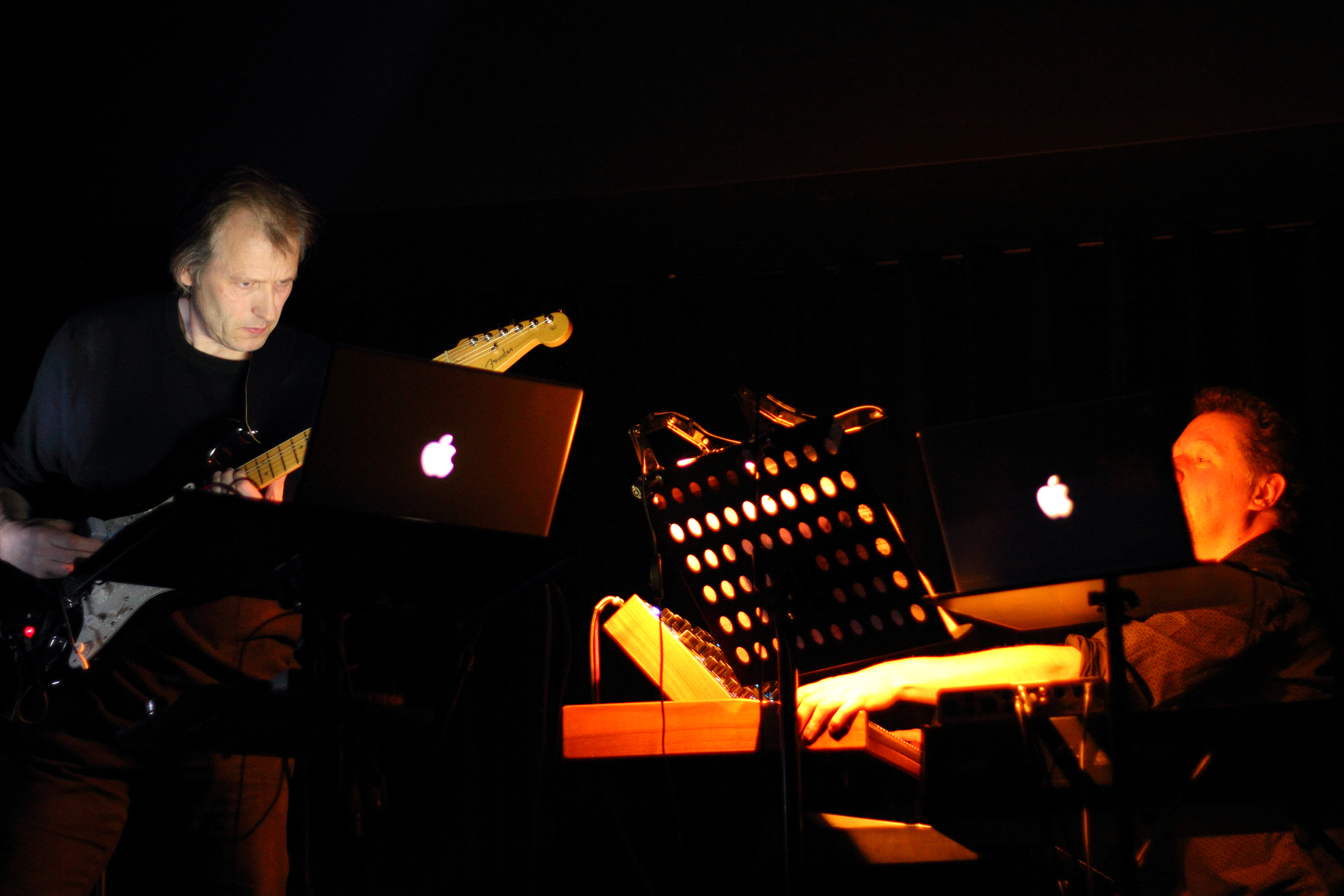

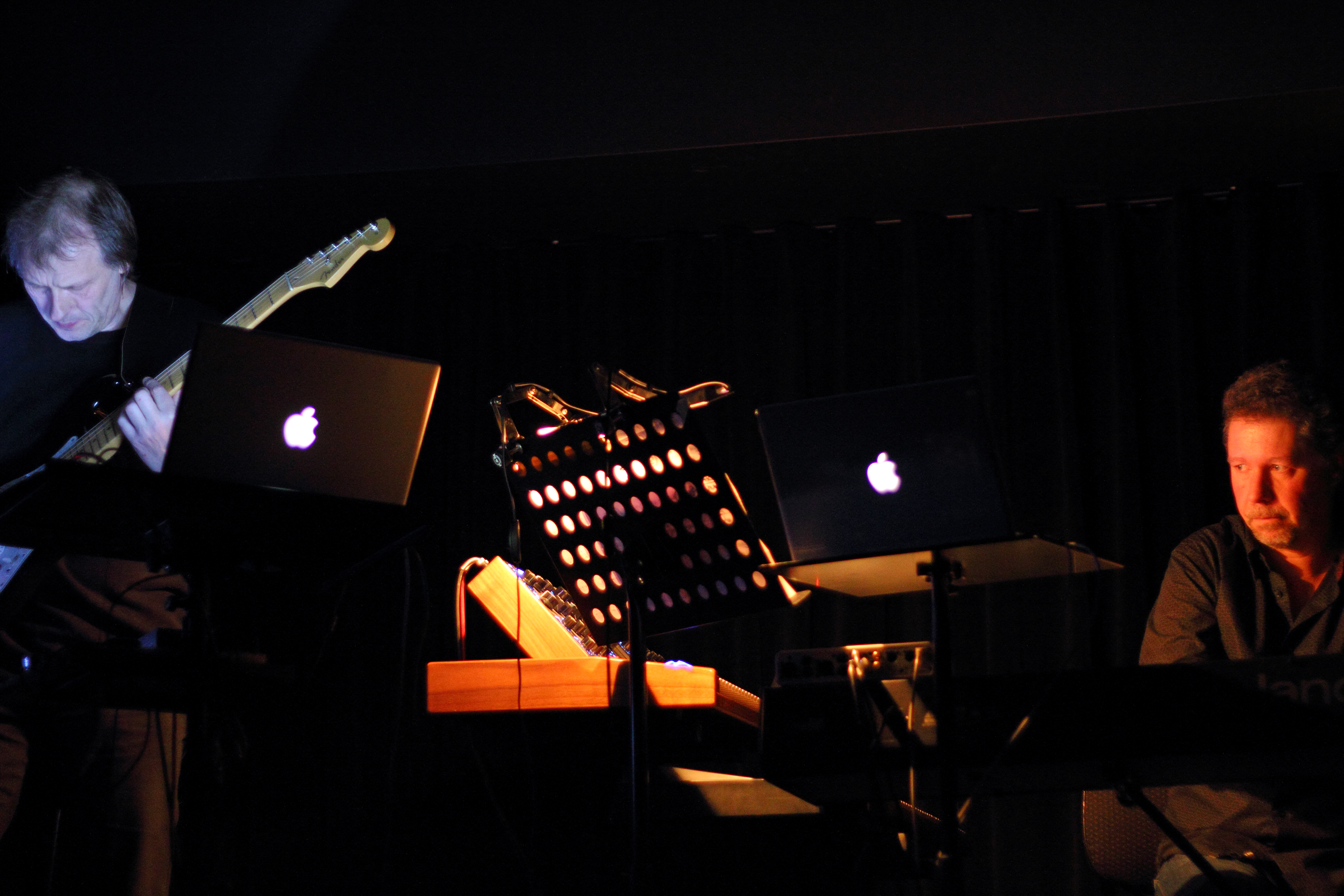

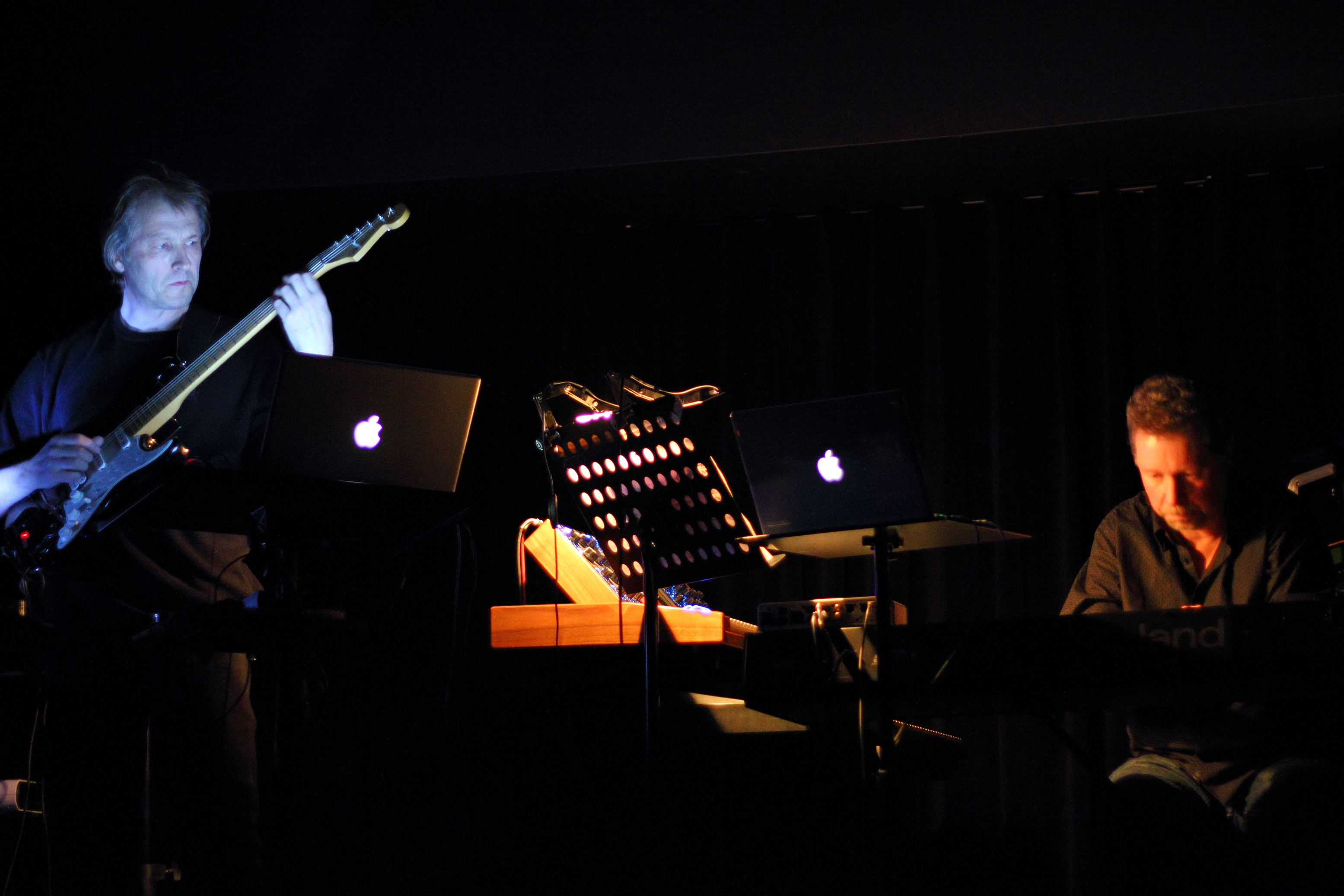

== Selection of works/discography ==
Solo albums:

- 1983 - "WHERE IT ALL BEGINS" (Hot Club Rec, LP-1983/Monumental, CD-1999)
- 1984 - "DREAMS OF PYRAMIDS" (Hot Club Rec, LP-1984)
- 1985 - "TRACES" (Cicada Rec/Badland, LP-1985/CD-1988. Re-released on Spotted Peccary Music, CD-2012. Abstrakce Records, LP-2023)
- 1986 - "SILVER BEACH" (Originally released 1986. Re-released on Projekt Records, -Digital 2013. Abstrakce Records, DBL LP-2023)
- 1990 - "IMAGES OF LIGHT" (Origo Sound, CD-1990. Re-released on Spotted Peccary Music, CD-2012)
- 1992 - "SOLSTICE" (Origo Sound, CD-1992. Re-released on Spotted Peccary Music, CD-2012)
- 1996 - "TRANSIT" (Monumental Records, CD)
- 1998 - "GUITAR NOVA" (Monumental Records, CD)
- 2001 - "WIND JOURNEY" (Monumental Records, CD)
- 2003 - "EMOTIONAL LANDSCAPES" (Spotted Peccary Music, CD)
- 2003 - "THE POLAR DRONES" (GROOVE Unlimited, CD)
- 2004 - "BLUE SKY, RED GUITARS" (Spotted Peccary Music, CD)
- 2007 - "ELEVATIONS" (Spotted Peccary Music, CD)
- 2010 - "GATEWAY" (Projekt, CD) * 2025 remaster (Projekt, 2CD)
- 2011 - "SILENT CURRENTS" (Projekt, Double CD)
- 2012 - "AIRBORNE" (Projekt, CD)
- 2013 - "SILENT CURRENTS 3" (Projekt, Digital)
- 2014 - "TIMELINES" (Projekt, CD)
- 2015 - "BLUE RADIANCE" (Projekt, CD)
- 2016 - "STAR'S END 2015 (SILENT CURRENTS 4)" (Projekt, CD)
- 2017 - "DIFFERENT SPACES" (Projekt, Double CD)
- 2017 - "CINEMATIC" (Projekt, CD)
- 2018 - "THRESHOLD POINT" (Projekt, CD)
- 2019 - "INFINITE MOMENTS" (Projekt, CD)
- 2019 - "SOURCES" (Smalltown Supersound, LP/CD)
- 2021 - "RECURRENCE" (Projekt, CD)
- 2021 - "NORTH STAR" (Projekt, CD)
- 2021 - "WINTER TIDE" Live at Soundquest Fest 2021 (Projekt, Digital)
- 2022 - "SOJOURNS" (Projekt, CD)
- 2023 - "THE SHAPE OF TIME" (Projekt, CD)
- 2023 - "CLOUD OF STRINGS" (Projekt, CD)
- 2024 - "CROSSING THE EQUATOR" (Projekt, Digital)
- 2024 - "SOLASTALGIA" (Projekt, 2CD)
- 2025 - "WHERE THE RIVER WIDENS" (Projekt, CD)
- 2026 - "SNOW TIDES" (Projekt, CD)
- 2026 - "EARTHSHINE" (Projekt, CD)

EP / Mini albums:

- 2004 - "ITUNES EXCLUSIVES" (Spotted Peccary Music, Digital)
- 2012 - "THE NOCTURNES" (Projekt, Digital)
- 2012 - "CRYSTAL BELLS" (Projekt, Digital)
- 2013 - "CELESTIA" (Projekt, Digital)
- 2014 - "TUNDRA" (Projekt, CD)
- 2015 - "ECHOTIDES" (Projekt, CD)
- 2022 - "INVERSIONS" (Projekt, Digital)
- 2023 - "THE LE PAYSAGE SINGLE" (Projekt, Digital)
- 2025 - "AERIS Suite" (Projekt, Digital)

Together with other artists/projects:

- 1984 - Wiese/Wøllo/Waring - "Trio" (Maza Rec, LP-1984/Curling Legs, CD-2008)
- 1984 - Celeste - "Design by Music" (Col, LP)
- 1992 - New Music Composers Group - "In Real Time" (Albedo, CD)
- 1995 - Bry/Springgard/Wøllo - "Fossegrimen" (Cappelen, Book/CD)
- 1996 - Pacemaker - "Pacemaker EP" (Beatservice, EP)
- 1997 - EXILE - "Dimension D" (Origo Sound, CD)
- 2001 - Erik Wøllo/Hyperlinkto - "Musikk til en Meny" (Monumental/Hyperlinkto, CD)
- 2009 - Steve Roach/Erik Wøllo - "Stream of Thought" (Projekt, CD)
- 2009 - Frank Van Bogaert with Erik Wøllo - "Air Machine" (Ace Studio Editions, CD)
- 2009 - Deborah Martin/Erik Wøllo - "Between Worlds" (Spotted Peccary Music, CD)
- 2009 - Erik Wøllo/Bernhard Wöstheinrich - "Arcadia Borealis" (DiN34, CD)
- 2010 - Kouame Sereba with Erik Wøllo - "Bako" (Etnisk Musikklubb, CD)
- 2011 - Steve Roach/Erik Wøllo - "The Road Eternal" (Projekt, CD)
- 2012 - Ian Boddy/Erik Wøllo - "Frontiers" (DiN, CD)
- 2014 - Ian Boddy/Erik Wøllo - "EC-12" (Live in Germany 2012, DiN, Digital)
- 2014 - Erik Wøllo/Bernhard Wöstheinrich - "Weltenuhr" (DiN46, CD)
- 2016 - Erik Wøllo/Byron Metcalf - "Earth Luminous" (Projekt, CD)
- 2016 - Byron Metcalf (feat: Erik Wøllo & Peter Phippen) - "Inner Rhythm Meditations" I (Sounds True, CD-2016)
- 2017 - Ian Boddy/Erik Wøllo - "Meridian" (DiN54, CD)
- 2018 - Byron Metcalf (feat: Erik Wøllo & Peter Phippen) - "Inner Rhythm Meditations" II (Heartdance, CD-2018)
- 2020 - Erik Wøllo/Michael Stearns - "Convergence" (Projekt, CD)
- 2021 - Byron Metcalf (feat: Erik Wøllo & Sherry Finzer) - "Rhythms of Remembering" (Dr Bam's Music, CD-2021)
- 2022 - Ian Boddy/Erik Wøllo - "Revolve" (DiN73, CD-2022)
- 2023 - Alan Elettronico - “Electric Dream (Erik Wøllo Remix)” - (Projekt Records, digital release)
- 2024 - Deborah Martin/Erik Wøllo - "Kinishba" (Spotted Peccary Music, CD)
- 2025 - Ian Boddy/Erik Wøllo - "Transmissions" (DiN92, CD)
- 2026 - Dashmesh/Erik Wøllo (feat. Byron Metcalf): "CAVE OF LIGHT AND SHADOW" (Wayfarer 2026)
- 2026 - Byron Metcalf/Erik Wøllo: "SPANNED TIMES" (EP - Wayfarer 2026)

Several selected compositions licensed for Collection Albums (not updated):

- 1999 - "Northern Nights" - (Six Degrees Records/Climate, CD)
- 2000 - "Music from the Edge" - (Margen Magazine, CD)
- 2001 - "The Echoes Living Room Concerts, vol. 7" - (Echoes, CD)
- 2002 - "Lights Out VIII" - (KINK fm102, CD)
- 2003 - "The Echoes Living Room Concerts, vol. 9" - (Echoes, CD)
- 2004 - "Michael Garrison Tribute Collection" - (Groove Unlimited, CD)
- 2005 - "Lights Out IX" - (KINK fm102, CD)
- 2006 - "Lights Out X" - (KINK fm102, CD)
- 2007 - "Stars End 30th Anniversary Anthology CD" (CD)
- 2009 - "The Projekt Sampler 2009" - (Projekt, CD)
- 2010 - "Afar" - (Projekt, CD)
- 2011 - "E-Day 2011" - (GROOVE Unlimited, CD)
- 2011 - "The Rope 25" - (Projekt, CD)
- 2011 - "The Echoes Living Room Concerts, Vol. 17" (Echoes, CD)
- 2011 - "PAWS, no - kill animal shelter benefit" CD Compilation (Industryeight CD)
- 2012 - "DiN40 - Various - iNDEX04" - DiN Records Sampler - (DiN, CD)
- 2013 - "Possibilities of Circumstance" - Various Artists (Projekt, CD)
- 2014 - "Winter 2014" - Various Artists (Projekt, CD)
- 2016 - "VISIONS" - A Collection of Music by Erik Wøllo (Projekt, CD)
- 2021 - "Gemstones" II - (Cyclical Dreams, digital 2021)

Library music:

- 2012 - Tracks on 13 collection albums (Synctracks)
- 2013 - "Electronic Landscapes" (Synctracks)
- 2013 - "Ambisonics 2" (De Wolfe Music)
- 2013 - "Ambisonics 1" (De Wolfe Music)
- 2015 - "Science, Tech and Design" (De Wolfe Music)
- 2017 - "Ambient Landscapes" (De Wolfe Music)
- 2017 - "Ambient Landscapes" (De Wolfe Music)
- 2020 - "Sonic Soundscapes" (De Wolfe Music)
- 2021 - "Future Landscapes" (De Wolfe Music)

Other works for different ensembles:

- 1982 - "Formations" (String Quartet)
- 1986 - "En Brottsjø" (Saxophone Quartet)
- 1986 - "Solar" (Tape/Woodwinds)
- 1988 - "Windows" (Sinfonietta)
- 1990 - "Pre Sense" (2 pno/Cl/Tr/Tape)
- 1992 - "Vidder" (Organ/E.horn)
- 1992 - "Accordance" (String Quartet)
- 1994 - "Lost in Legoland" (Fl/Git/Voc)
- 1997 - "Magnushymnen" (Voc/Fl/Git/Brass)
- 1998 - "Ceramics" (Fl/Perc/Tape)
- 1998 - "Imaginations" (String Quartet)
- 1999 - "Millennium 2000" (Sinfonietta/Soprano/Choir/Organ)
- 2000 - "Transitions" (Sinfonietta/Soprano)
- 2002 - "Unity" (String Quartet)
- 2011 - "Snowflakes" (Girl Choir/Small Orchestra)
- 2013 - "Elementa Ultra" (Large Wind Orchestra/Guitar/Electronics)
- 2015 - "Fragmenter fra en Aftenstemning" (Large Wind Orchestra)
- 2016 - "Cluster" (String Quartet/Electronics)

Music for ballet:

- 1986 - "Pyramider" (Trine Thorbjørnsen)
- 1992 - "Jeg Drømte" (Kjersti Engebrigtsen)
- 1999 - "Gips"(Spig Wibrodux)- (Wøllo/Bry/Kask)
- 1999 - "Ursula X" (Teet Kask)
- 2001 - "Shadowgraph" (Teet Kask)
- 2002 - "Cascade" (Jane Hveding)
- 2004 - "Distant Buddha" (Teet Kask)
- 2004 - "Fragile" (Kjersti Engebrigtsen)
- 2007 - "Breathing Space" (Kjersti Engebrigtsen)

Music for theatre/multi-media:

- 1991 - "Motspillerne" (Kittelsen/Thorbjørnsen - 1988/91)
- 1992 - "Aldri Verden" (Vik/Schjøll)
- 1996 - "Abiriels Løve" (Kittelsen/Thorbjørnsen)
- 1996 - "Fossegrimen" (Bry/Springgard/Wøllo - 1992/95/96)
- 2005 - "Livskraften" (Thor Rummelhoff)
- 2007 - "Heimen Vår" (Bry/Springgard/Wøllo)

Video/film/exhibitions:

- 1996 - "Transit" - music video to the album (X-Ray/Monumental).
- 1998 - "Rift" (Continental Drift) -Video from Iceland (Patrick Huse/Aschehoug).
- 1997 - "Antebellum America" -Video/Installation (Sven Påhlsson)
- 1998 - "Lay Out" -Video/Installation (Sven Påhlsson)
- 1999 - "Street Lights" -Video/Installation (Sven Påhlsson)
- 1999 - "Fun House" -Video/Installation (Sven Påhlsson)
- 2000 - "Crash Course" -Video/Installation (Sven Påhlsson)
- 2002 - "Sprawlville" -Video/Installation (Sven Påhlsson)
- 2003 - "Consuming Pleasures" -Video/Installation (Sven Påhlsson)
- 2003 - "Falling Down" -Video/Installation (Sven Påhlsson)
- 2005 - "Balling Games" -Video/Installation (Sven Påhlsson)
- 2006 - "Playing Games Paying Games" -Video/Installation (Sven Påhlsson)
- 2007 - "Lille Øistein" -computer game (Netron/Mediaparken)
- 2000 - "Ice Works", music to Ice sculpture (Helge Røed)
- 2000 - "Kulturstreif Hallingdal", -Internet project (www.kulturstreif.no)
- 2000 - "En Transformert Reise", video (Kirkhorn/Urstad)
- 2001 - "Chat Chat Chat", Animations/Internet interactive (Alvin/Hyperlinkto)
- 2003 - "Under Overflaten", video (Kurt Hermansen)
- 2005 - "Beacons", Light/Sound installation at Asker Railway station (Påhlsson/Wøllo)
- 2005 - "Elevator", Photo and Sound Installation (Christine Istad)
- 2005 - "Year", Dramatic Feature Film (Mike Carroll)
- 2006 - "Eventyrsøppel" - Installation with Music (Martens/Frantzen)
- 2011 - "Spectra Emotions", Video and Sound Installation (Christine Istad)
- 2012 - "Running High" -Video/Installation (Sven Påhlsson)

Diverse:

- Films / TV - documentaries: NRK/TV2 and others (Norway). Also diverse Film/Documentaries for TV and Radio in Europe, Japan and US.
- Several Multimedia / Exhibitions
- "Off The Wall" - World music concert project for schools, produced by Rikskonsertene 2005. (Kouame Sereba/Erik Wøllo/Uriel Seri)
