= Structures from Silence =

Studio album by Steve Roach
- Released: July 15, 1984
- Recorded: 1983–1984
- Studio: Timeroom, Culver City, California
- Genre: Ambient; electronic; space music; new-age
- Length: 58:27
- Label: Projekt
- Producer: Steve Roach

Steve Roach chronology
Traveler (1983)	Structures from Silence (1984)	Quiet Music 1 (1986)

Alternative cover
- Remastered edition, 2001.

Structures from Silence is the third studio album by American ambient musician Steve Roach. It was released on July 15, 1984 by Fortuna. Since 2001, the album has been available on Projekt.

== Background and recording ==
The title track, Structures from Silence, took Steve Roach a few months to compose. He would play the song using an Oberheim OB-8 and Oberheim DSX sequencer day and night, adjusting it until it sounded right to him. Finally, he went to a recording studio and recorded the song in a single 30-minute long pass, using his own gear along with a second OB-8 as well as a Lexicon 224 digital reverberator.

== Release and promotion ==
In 1987, a VHS video titled Structures from Silence was released. It featured imagery created by Marianne Dolan set to the album's title track. This video was also released on laserdisc under the title Space Dreaming.

A remastered version of this album, with a different cover, was released in 2001 by Projekt.

A 30-year anniversary edition was released by Projekt in 2014. The album was remastered in 24-bit/96 kHz from the original analog mixes. There is both a single-CD edition, and a 3-CD deluxe edition that includes two bonus discs created in 2013. Both editions use the original cover art. The remastered original album (but not the two bonus discs) was made available as 24-bit/96 kHz digital downloads.

== Music ==
Structures from Silence makes use of loops, drones and motifs. Andy Beta of Pitchfork described the album as "three extended compositions". He stated that the album's tracks "exude a peaceful calm," and he also stated that the title track was "a half hour of contemplative bliss." Further, he said: "Like a desert mirage, these structures hover forever at the horizon, an oasis from the din surrounding it." Ted Raggett of AllMusic said:

"Though Roach's approach changed and explored many new directions, there's a core aesthetic still at work, that of contrasting a variety of loops and repeated motifs with subtle melodic exploration. The interweaving of the two approaches, to the point where it's never quite clear what predominates at what point -- especially on opening track 'Reflections in Suspension' – makes for music both cyclic and open-ended."

The influence of Tangerine Dream and Vangelis is apparent on the album.

== Reception and legacy ==
Professional ratings
Review scores
Source	Rating
AllMusic	5/5 stars
Alternative Press	favorable
Musique Machine	4/5 stars
Q	favorable

In late November 2014, Steve Roach was selected as Echoes Radio's #1 Artist and Structures from Silence was voted as the #2 album.

Fact listed Structures from Silence as the tenth best album of the 1980s, calling it a "thoughtful, slow-paced study in synthesizer" and one of the most important ambient albums of all time. They listed the 2014 reissue as the fourth best reissue that year, commenting that "it's a perfect time to return to this classic album – still spellbinding, three decades on." In 2016, Pitchfork listed it as the 33rd best ambient album of all time.

Ted Raggett of Pitchfork gave the album a perfect score, saying: "Widely considered his breakout album where he found his own voice, it even made a list of Top Ten releases published in a magazine dedicated to yoga. Whether a listener uses it for that purpose or not, it does have to be said that Structures from Silence is a lovely effort indeed. Its chief allure remains its transcendence of time – while one can surmise, based on the sound of the record, its early-'80s vintage, it is not an obviously dated album in and of itself. [...] Structures from Silence is its own notable peak, the first of many astonishing highlights for Roach."

== Track listing ==
All music is composed by Steve Roach.

No.	Title	Length
1.	"Reflections in Suspension"	16:39
2.	"Quiet Friend"	13:15
3.	"Structures from Silence"	28:33

=== 30th anniversary bonus discs ===
Disc 2: Suspension and Reflection
No.	Title	Length
1.	"Suspension"	28:36
2.	"Reflection"	30:24

Disc 3: Below and Beyond
No.	Title	Length
1.	"Beyond"	32:11
2.	"Below"	39:47

== Personnel ==
Per liner notes.

- Steve Roach — performer, producer, recording engineer
- Michael Stearns — spatial enhancements
- Kevin Braheny — spatial enhancements
- Richard Bailey — cover art
