= Linda Kohanov =

American horse trainer

Linda Kohanov is an author, speaker, riding instructor, and horse trainer. Kohanov is best known in the field called "equine facilitated psychotherapy" (closely related to therapeutic horseback riding), and as the author of five books, The Tao of Equus: A Woman's Journey of Healing and Transformation through the Way of the Horse (2001), Riding between the Worlds: Expanding Our Potential through the Way of the Horse (2003), Way of the Horse: Equine Archetypes for Self Discovery (2007), The Power of the Herd: A Nonpredatory Approach to Social Intelligence, Leadership, and Innovation (2012) and The Five Roles of a Master Herder: A Revolutionary Model for Socially Intelligent Leadership (2016). Linda's books have been used as texts in university courses across the country and have received appreciative reviews in publications as diverse as Horse and Rider, Natural Horse, IONS Noetic Sciences Review, Shift, Spirituality and Health, Animal Wellness, The Equestrian News and Strides (the magazine published by the North American Riding for the Handicapped Association). Many courses in equine assisted therapy have her books as essential reading for example in the UK one of the growing number of equine facilitated Psychotherapy organisations IFEAL cites her books throughout their teaching.

Among her numerous lectures throughout the U.S. and Canada, she was a presenter at the 2001 NARHA conference and was the keynote speaker at the 2003 NARHA conference. She was also a featured presenter at the 2004 International Transpersonal Conference.

In 1997, she founded Epona Equestrian Services in Arizona, a collective of instructors of the Epona method. These registered Epona instructors all offer equine-facilitated psychotherapy sessions and are spread across the world. One of the co founders of Epona approach was Kathleen Barry Ingram. Kathleen and Linda began working together by creating workshops and individual intensives in 1998, where they incorporated their talents and expertise to develop an innovative and creative healing modality employing the horses as equal partners. In 2003, the first Epona Equestrian Services apprenticeship class graduated. Kathleen and Linda co-created, developed, and taught the apprenticeship program together until 2007, when the ninth class graduated. Kohanov also worked as a radio producer and announcer, and as a music critic and print journalist.

She is married to ambient composer and musician Steve Roach (and provided vocals on some of his recordings, such as the 1996 album The Magnificent Void). Roach’s 1993 album Origins contains a poem by Kohanov.

== Bibliography ==
- 2001: The Tao of Equus: A Woman's Journey of Healing and Transformation through the Way of the Horse. Novato, CA: New World Library. ISBN 978-1-57731-182-9
- 2003: Riding between the Worlds: Expanding Our Potential through the Way of the Horse. Novato, CA: New World Library. ISBN 978-1-57731-416-5
- 2007: "Way of the Horse: Equine Archetypes for Self Discovery: A Book of Exploration and 40 Cards". Novato, CA: New World Library. ISBN 978-1577315131
- 2012: „The Power of the Herd. A Nonpredatory Approach to Social Intelligence, Leadership, and Innovation“. Novato, CA: New World Library. ISBN 978-1-60868-371-0
- 2016: „The Five Roles of a Master Herder. A Revolutionary Model for Socially Intelligent Leadership“. Novato, CA: New World Library. ISBN 978-1-60868-546-2
