= Jorge Reyes (musician) =

Mexican musician (1952–2009)

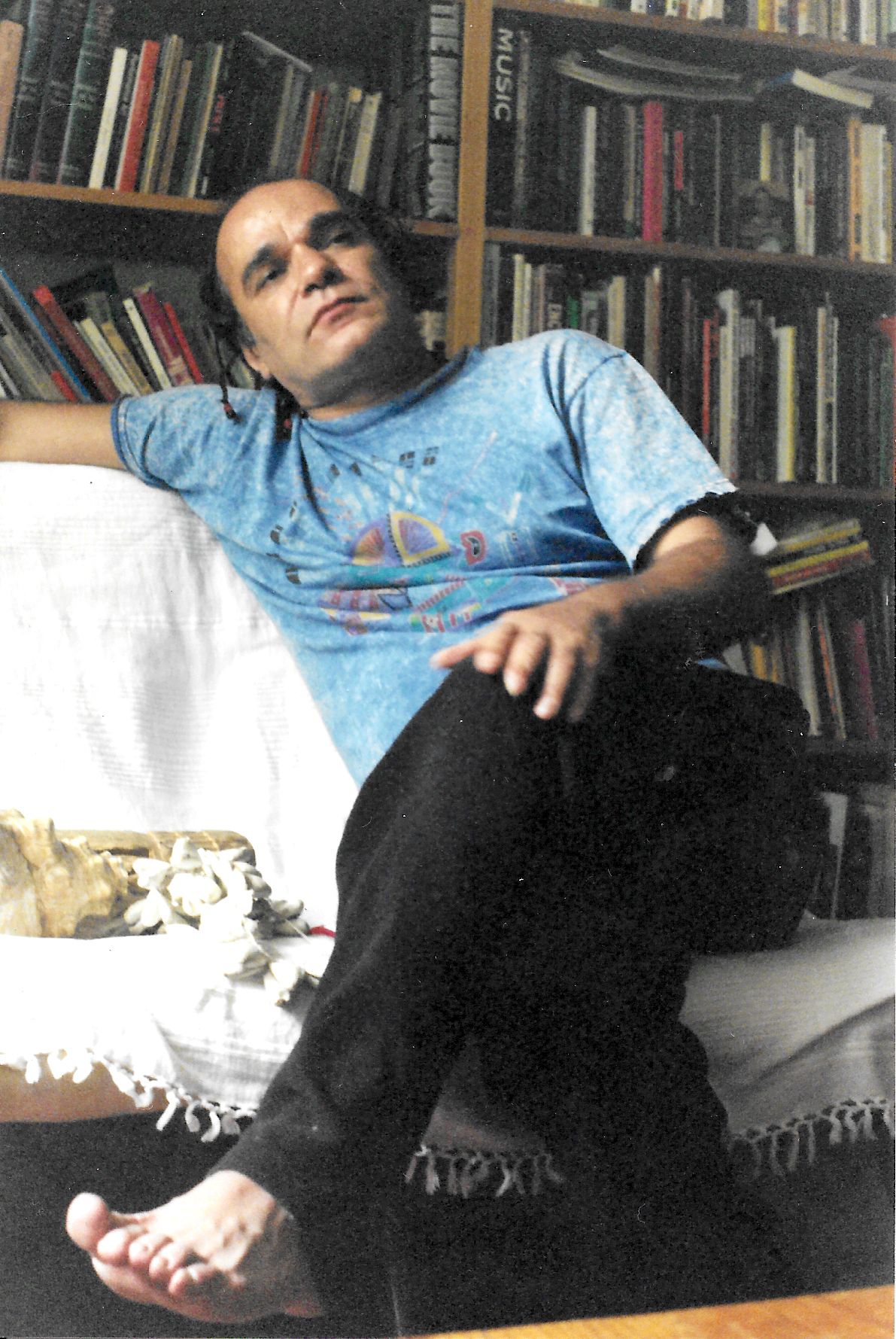
Jorge Reyes

Jorge Reyes (September 24, 1952 – February 7, 2009) was a Mexican ambient electronic musician who incorporated elements of his native Mexican culture into his music. He performed as the member of several groups (mostly known for his time with Chac Mool ) and collaborations (most notably with Steve Roach as well as Suso Saiz) and as a solo artist.

== Biography ==
Reyes was born on September 24, 1952, in Uruapan, Michoacán, Mexico with the name Jorge Reyes Valencia. He was not a Native Mexican, but played many Prehispanic instruments to which he was exposed from an early age in his village. Reyes attended the National School of Music, Mexico (Escuela Nacional de Musica de la Universidad Nacional Autónoma de México, or UNAM) 1970–1975, studying the flute. During this time, he formed two seminal Mexican rock bands, Al Universo and Nuevo México, influenced by Jethro Tull and Pink Floyd but incorporating native musical instruments. In 1976, his growing interest in jazz led to spending a year in Hamburg, Germany, where he studied improvisation with Herb Geller. As part of this training, he traveled through Turkey, Pakistan, Afghanistan, and Sri Lanka. In 1978, he attended a Hindu music course in the Himalayas, in which he studied traditional Indian flute and percussion techniques. On these overseas trips, he began collecting many native instruments.

After returning to Mexico, Reyes founded the band Chac Mool with drummer Armando Suárez and keyboardist Carlos Alvarado, which was one of the first Mexican progressive rock bands. The band recorded four well-received albums, on which Reyes played flute and guitar, before disbanding.

In 1985, Reyes began a prolific solo career. He collaborated with several other new-age and electronic musicians, including American synthesist Steve Roach, Mexican singer and multi-instrumentalist Arturo Meza (of the band Decibel), Spanish guitarist Suso Saiz, Mexican percussionist Juan Carlos López, German synthesist Elmar Schulte (of the band Solitaire), Deep Forest, and others.

His music was used frequently in Mexican radio and television programs. He performed many concerts at famous Mexican archeological sites such as Malinalco, Teotihuacan, Templo Mayor, Chichen Itza, and Tenango del Valle. His annual Día de los Muertos concerts at UNAM were popular events. He also gave many concerts at the Espacio Escultórico de Ciudad Universitaria, where he collaborated with dancer and choreographer Regina Quintero.

Reyes died from a heart attack at his recording studio in Mexico City while reinterpreting "Teguala" by fellow Mexican composer Felipe Waller on Saturday February 7, 2009. He was 56 years old. He had three children—Citlalli, Ridwan (with Ursula Kipp), and Erendira (with Ariane Pellicer).

== Discography ==
=== Solo ===
- Ek-Tunkúl (1983)
- A La Izquierda Del Colibri (with Antonio Zepeda) (1985)
- Comala (with Arturo Meza & La Tribu) (1986)
- Viento De Navajas (1987)
- Crónica De Castas (with Suso Saiz) (1990)
- Mexican Music: Prehispanic (1990)
- Niérika (1990)
- UAISCM4: Tlaloc (with Francisco López) (1991)
- Bajo El Sol Jaguar (with Suso Saiz y Juan Carlos López) (1992)
- El Costumbre (with Juan Carlos López)(1993)
- Mexican Music: Prehispanic Music for the Forgotten Spirits (1994)
- Mexican Music: Prehispanic Mystic Rites (1994)
- The Flayed God (with Steve Roach) (1994)
- Tonami (1995)
- Mort Aux Vaches (1996)
- Mexican Music: Prehispanic Rituals (1996)
- Vine ~ Bark & Spore (with Steve Roach) (2000)
- La Otra Conquista (soundtrack) (with Samuel Zyman) (2000)
- Pluma De Piedra (with Piet Jan Blauw) (2002)
- Ciudad De México Y Chiapas: Dos Paisajes Sonoros (with Peter Avar) (2006)
- Ethnoaural (with Barbelo) (2008)

=== with Suspended Memories (Steve Roach & Suso Saiz) ===
- Forgotten Gods (1993, Hearts of Space Records)
- Earth Island (1994, Fathom/Hearts of Space Records)
- Twilight Earth: Second International Soirée (various artists) (1995)

=== with Chac Mool ===
- Nadie en Especial (1980)
- Sueños de Metal (1981)
- Cintas en Directo (1982)
- Caricia Digital (1983)
- 25 Aniversario Box Set (compilation) (2005)

=== Film appearance ===
- La Otra Conquista (1998 Film)

== See also ==
- Ambient music
- Electronic music
- Music of Mexico
- New-age music
