= Open-handed drumming =

Method of playing a drum kit

Open-handed drumming is a method of playing a drum kit.

== Method ==
The method involves not crossing the hands when playing the hi-hat (or ride-cymbal) and snare drum simultaneously, as opposed to the more traditional way of playing drums, which features crossed hands as the basic playing position. Absolute beginners often choose this open-handed way of playing as their first and natural attempt at drumming.

A number of drummers experiment and are comfortable with open-handed drumming but do not always play in that configuration, such as Dennis Chambers, Sean Reinert, Thomas Lang and Marco Minnemann. Steve Smith and Deen Castronovo have used the open-hand technique for the Journey song "Don't Stop Believin'".

== Cymbals ==
Many drummers who use this style position their "ride" cymbal on the same side as their hi-hat to enable quick transitions between the two. There are also open-handed drummers who keep the ride cymbal in its traditional position on the opposite side of the hi-hat of the drum kit. Still other open-handed drummers use two rides and/or two hi-hats (one on each side of the kit).

== Sticking ==
Open-handed players normally use French grip rather than American "traditional grip" (generally used in marching and jazz) or "German grip" mainly used in rock, funk and pop. Notable exceptions being Mike Bordin in the videoclip for the song "Evidence" (by Faith No More), Matt Chamberlain in the videoclip for the song "What I Am" (by Edie Brickell & New Bohemians) and Virgil Donati utilising traditional grip. Lenny White, as a left handed drummer, also used to play open handed with traditional grip, playing on a right handed kit.

== Beginnings and development ==
Open handed playing was first conceived as idea with Jim Chapin's book Advanced Techniques for the Modern Drummer, and Gary Chester's book The New Breed which emphasize coordinated independence, leading with both hands and legs.

The first drummers who started open-handed playing are musicians like Billy Cobham, Lenny White, and Dennis Wilson, who started this way of playing in the 1960s and early 1970s either out of instinct (such as Wilson, who was naturally left-handed and therefore felt more comfortable leading with that hand), or out of experimentation, finding the advantage of not having to cross one's hands over in complex fills or playing the hi-hats in the traditional manner. Many proponents of the technique have also noted that the lack of a "roof" of another arm crossing over allows for the full range of the snare playing arm's stroke to be available, meaning that loud rimshots are more easily played. Others have pointed out the added conservation of energy attained by not having to fully raise and cross one's lead hand when playing, for instance, between the hi-hats and ride in faster passages. As a result, many drummers in more extreme genres have adopted this technique. Another advantage is a player's access to the floor tom while playing the hi-hats, a feat infamously difficult to pull off in the traditional technique without access to an auxiliary floor tom.

In 2008 and 2011 Dom Famularo and Claus Hessler wrote Open Handed Playing vol.1 and 2, which are lessons focused entirely on open-handed playing.

== Heavy metal music ==
Open-handed playing is more common in the metal genre than other contemporary music as it is easier to hit the snare drum hard at high tempos with the dominating hand. Plus the other arm is not in the way, with the hi-hat mounted low. Punk drummers often set their hi-hat very high, from the snare, for the same reason (though obviously maintaining crosstick position). Another reason being the use of two bass drums and/or four or more rack toms in which case a stock hi-hat gets to be (uncomfortably) far away from the snare drum otherwise.

Open-handed drumming in metal can include the use of a left-side ride, which has been used by drummers such as Gene Hoglan to play intricate stickings across two rides with contrasting sounds.

== Open-handed drummers ==
=== First proponents ===
- Billy Cobham (Mahavishnu Orchestra, Miles Davis)
- Steve Upton (Wishbone Ash)
- Jim Chapin
- Micky Dolenz (The Monkees)
- Lenny White (Return to Forever, Miles Davis)
- Gary Chester
- Dennis Wilson (The Beach Boys)
- Jürgen Rosenthal (Eloy)
- Art Tripp (The Mothers of Invention, Captain Beefheart & His Magic Band)
- Rod de'Ath (Rory Gallagher)
- Jim Bonfanti (Raspberries)
- Chris Slade (Tom Jones, Manfred Mann's Earth Band, AC/DC)

=== Second era drummers ===
- Simon Phillips (Toto, The Who, Jeff Beck)
- Jimmy Copley
- Deen Castronovo (Journey)
- Dom Famularo
- Scott Travis (Judas Priest)
- Bobby Jarzombek (Halford, Fates Warning)
- Claus Hessler
- Rod Morgenstein (Dixie Dregs, Winger)
- Phil Gould (Level 42)
- Joe English (Wings)
- Tom Hunting (Exodus)
- Gary Husband (Allan Holdsworth, Level 42)

=== Modern open handed drummers ===
- Mike Mangini (Dream Theater)
- King Coffey (Butthole Surfers)
- Fenriz (Darkthrone)
- Neil Sanderson (Three Days Grace)
- Carter Beauford (Dave Matthews Band)
- Michael "Moose" Thomas (Bullet for My Valentine)
- Shawn Drover (Megadeth, Act of Defiance)
- Sammy Siegler (Youth of Today, CIV, Rival Schools, Judge, Head Automatica)
- Duncan Arsenault (The Curtain Society, The Curtis Mayflower)
- Mike Bordin (Faith No More, Ozzy Osbourne)
- Steffan Halperin (Klaxons)
- Todd Friend (H_{2}O)
- Mika Karppinen (HIM)
- Josh Eppard (Coheed and Cambria)
- Ginger Fish (Marilyn Manson)
- Gene Hoglan (Dark Angel and Dethklok, formerly of Testament, Death, Devin Townsend, Strapping Young Lad and Fear Factory)
- John Kiffmeyer (formerly of Green Day and Isocracy)
- Christopher Guanlao (Silversun Pickups)
- Scott Mercado (Candlebox) (Brandi Carlile)
- Jason Finn (The Presidents of the USA)
- Rob Davidson (Pompeii)
- Ilan Rubin (Nine Inch Nails, Angels & Airwaves, The New Regime, Lostprophets, Paramore, Foo Fighters)
- Daniel Platzman (Imagine Dragons)
- Mark Heron (Oceansize)
- Matt Schulz (Holy Fuck)
- Danny Carey (Tool)
- Matt Cameron (Soundgarden, Pearl Jam)
- Ray Luzier (Korn)
- Alex Rüdinger (The Faceless, Ordinance, Conquering Dystopia)
- Sal Abruscato (Type O Negative, Life of Agony, A Pale Horse Named Death)
- Paul Mazurkiewicz (Cannibal Corpse)
- Harry Miree
- Boris Williams (The Cure)
- Louis Cole (Knower)
- Mike Smith (Suffocation)
- John Blackwell (Prince, Patti LaBelle, Bootsy Collins, Cameo)
- Will Calhoun (Living Colour)
