= Quality Over Opinion =

Studio album by Louis Cole
- Released: October 14, 2022
- Length: 69:50
- Label: Brainfeeder

Louis Cole chronology
LIVE 2019 (2020)	Quality Over Opinion (2022)

Singles from Quality Over Opinion
- 1. "Let it Happen" Released: August 2, 2022; 2. "I'm Tight" Released: August 23, 2022; 3. "Not Needed Anymore" Released: September 14, 2022; 4. "Dead Inside Shuffle" Released: September 28, 2022

Quality Over Opinion is the sixth solo album and fourth studio album by American musician Louis Cole. It was released on October 14, 2022, on Brainfeeder. It was nominated for Best Alternative Jazz Album at the 66th Annual Grammy Awards; and the single "Let it Happen" was nominated for Best Arrangement, Instrumental and Vocals the previous year.

== Background and release ==
Quality Over Opinion was Cole's second album released through Brainfeeder, after 2018's Time. The album was recorded and produced in Cole's home studio, with Cole performing most of the instruments himself. According to Cole, inspirations for the album included Gustav Mahler, György Ligeti, Miles Davis, Meshuggah, Morten Lauridsen, and Super Mario Kart.

Cole released four singles in the months leading up to the album's release: "Let it Happen", "I'm Tight", "Not Needed Anymore", and "Dead Inside Shuffle". Cole filmed music videos for all four of these, as well as for "Park Your Car on My Face" and "Shallow Laughter / Bitches". He also released a full-album lyric video of himself lip syncing along in a bathroom mirror. In an article for NPR, Nate Chinen noted Cole's "deadpan dance" moves and absurdist humor in the video for "I'm Tight".

== Reception ==
Quality Over Opinion was met with positive reviews, with Chinen describing the album as "bracing" and Ammar Kalia of The Guardian calling it Cole's "most accomplished and well-rounded work to date". Michael Major of BroadwayWorld described "I'm Tight" as "a sleek, laser-focused Funk rocket, based on an utterly irresistible bassline."

=== Accolades ===
Quality Over Opinion awards and nominations
Year	Organization	Award	Work	Status	Ref.
2023	Grammy Awards	Best Arrangement, Instrumental and Vocals	"Let It Happen"	Nominated	
2024	Grammy Awards	Best Alternative Jazz Album	Quality Over Opinion	Nominated	

== Track listing ==
No.	Title	Length
1.	"Quality Over Opinion"	3:39
2.	"Dead Inside Shuffle"	3:19
3.	"Not Needed Anymore"	1:32
4.	"Shallow Laughter"	1:48
5.	"Bitches" (feat. Sam Gendel)	2:35
6.	"Message" (feat. Chris Fishman and Nate Wood)	4:28
7.	"Failing in a Cool Way"	3:15
8.	"Disappear"	3:53
9.	"I'm Tight"	7:00
10.	"True Love"	3:40
11.	"Planet X"	2:47
12.	"Let Me Snack" (feat. Marlon Mackey)	2:18
13.	"Forgetting"	1:55
14.	"Park Your Car on My Face"	3:36
15.	"Don't Care" (feat. Genevieve Artadi)	5:22
16.	"Laughing in Her Sleep"	3:32
17.	"Outer Moat Behavior"	1:51
18.	"When" (feat. Kurt Rosenwinkel)	4:26
19.	"Let it Happen"	6:42
20.	"Little Piano Thing"	2:12
Total length:		1:09:50
