= Cascio Interstate Music =

American musical instrument retailer

Interstate Music
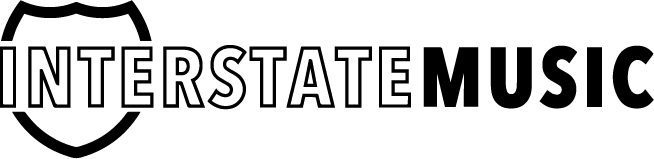
- Type: Private
- Industry: Music
- Founded: 1946
- Headquarters: Menomonee Falls, Wisconsin
- Key people: Jeff Peterson, Owner/Chief Executive Officer; Casey Seidl, Owner/Director of Sales and Operations
- Products: Artist Management, Recording, Video Production, Music Retail
- Website: InterstateMusic.com

Interstate Music is an American music and media production company, artist management firm and musical instrument retailer headquartered in Menomonee Falls, Wisconsin. Interstate Music provides artists with recording services, content creation, management and merchandise, as well as owns and operates interstatemusic.com, an online instrument and equipment store. Since 1946, Interstate Music has been part of the music products industry through its multi-channel retail, wholesale, and manufacturing operations. Since 2022, Interstate Music has operated a location on Music Row in Nashville, Tennessee, that serves as a headquarters for all artist services.

== History ==
Frank Cascio, the son of Italian immigrants, discovered a passion for music by playing an old piano in the back room of the Milwaukee neighborhood grocery store founded by his parents Rosario and Concetta. He eventually mastered the accordion and played live on local radio stations. After completing his service as a corpsman in the US Army in the Philippines, Cascio and his wife Marcie founded the West Milwaukee Accordion School on Beloit Road in West Milwaukee. Besides giving lessons and selling accordions, the store also sold Motorola televisions and radios.

After continued growth, a mail order division, Interstate Music Supply, began in 1970, initially with a small flyer to service regional school band directors in the far corners of Wisconsin, but which eventually grew into larger catalogs. In 1973, a second location, Cascio Music-West, was added in the rural New Berlin suburb of Milwaukee. The New Berlin store grew and eventually replaced the Lincoln Avenue store, which closed in 1976.

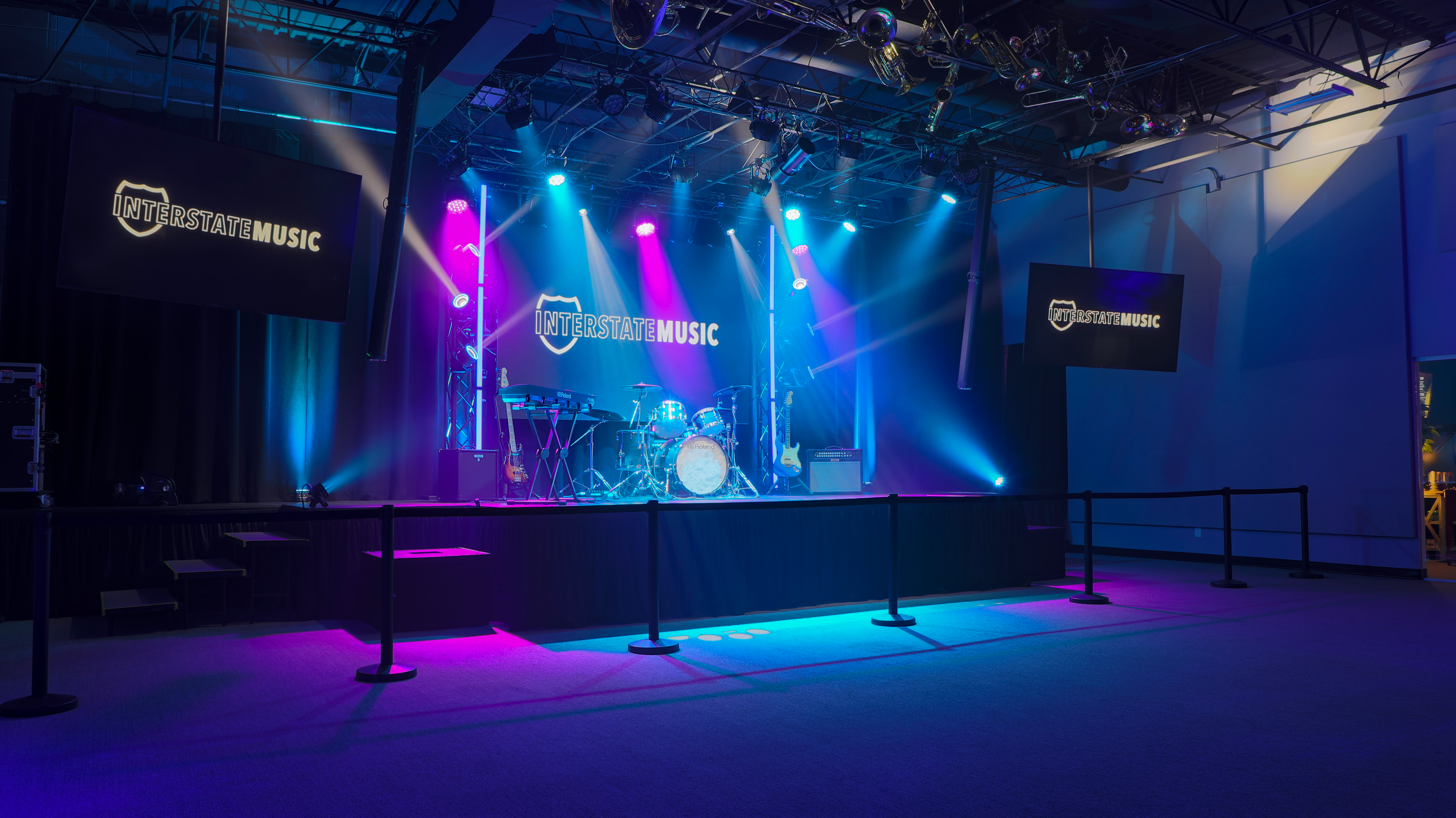
The Caribou Room in 2022.

In 2020, Wisconsin-based logistics and digital marketing agency, Geneva Supply, acquired Cascio Interstate Music through a voluntary receivership and rebranded the company Interstate Music. With this change in ownership, Interstate Music shifted focus towards artist services, content creation and management, while still maintaining their online retail business.

Shortly after the acquisition, Interstate Music began work on a live music venue custom-built for obtaining live show video content, which opened in 2021 as the Caribou Room.

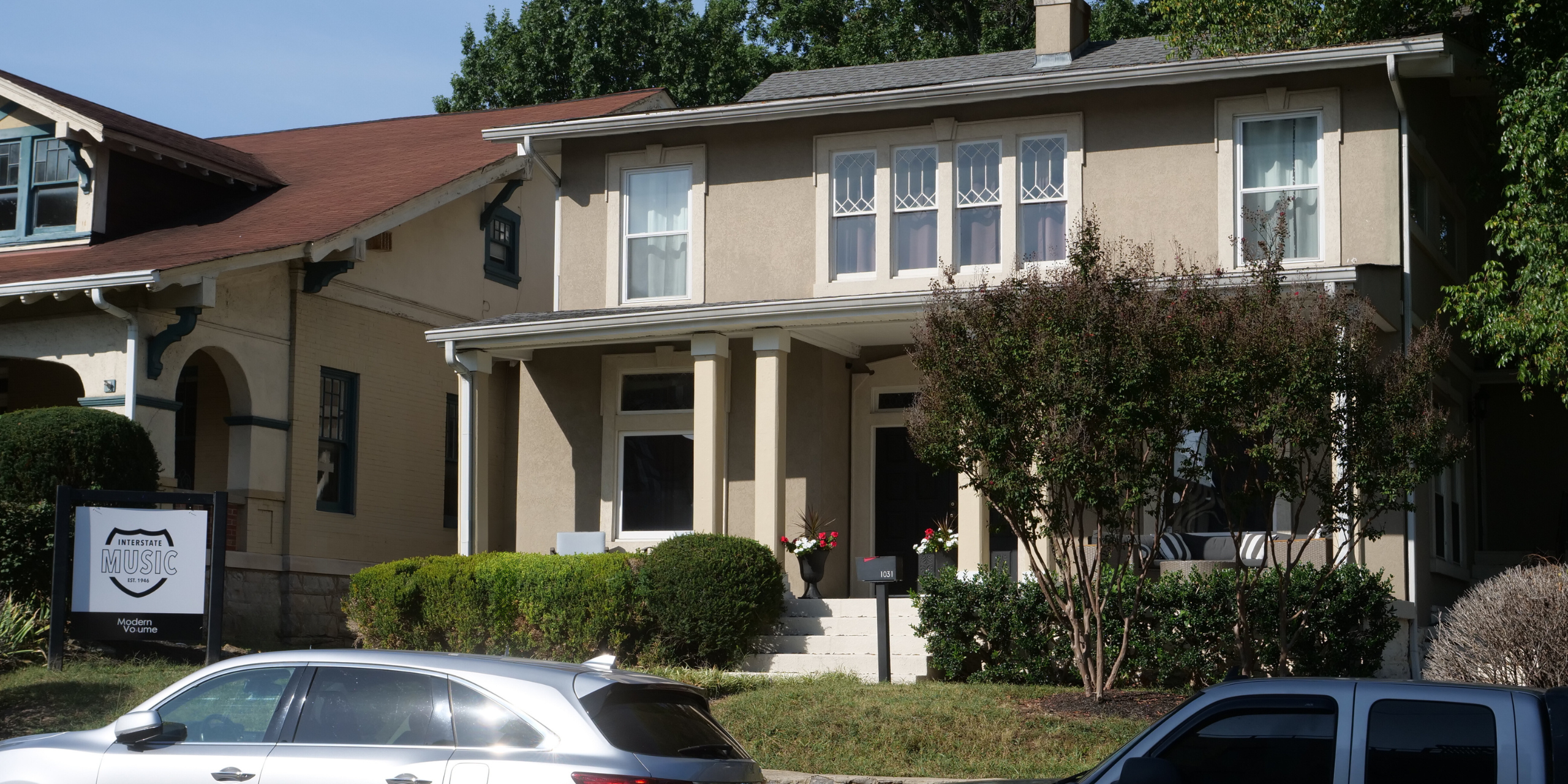
The Interstate Music House in Nashville, TN.

After an increase in demand for creative services and positive reception from artists, Interstate Music opened a location on Music Row in Nashville, Tennessee in early 2023. This location houses a full recording studio, writer's rooms, and offices. Grammy Award-winning engineer and producer, Greg Collins, assisted in the studio build, and is currently a collaborative partner of Interstate Music, and works out of the studio.

In July 2023, Interstate Music opened an additional recording space on Music Square. After further growth in Nashville, Interstate Music migrated all of their operations from the Interstate Music House to an office building located at 21 Music Square W, Nashville, TN.

== Artist Services ==
Interstate Music currently handles a variety of work within the music industry, including:

- Artist Management
- Content creation
- Merchandise design and distribution
- Music recording and production
- Music video production
- Song publishing
- Social media management

== Van Jams ==
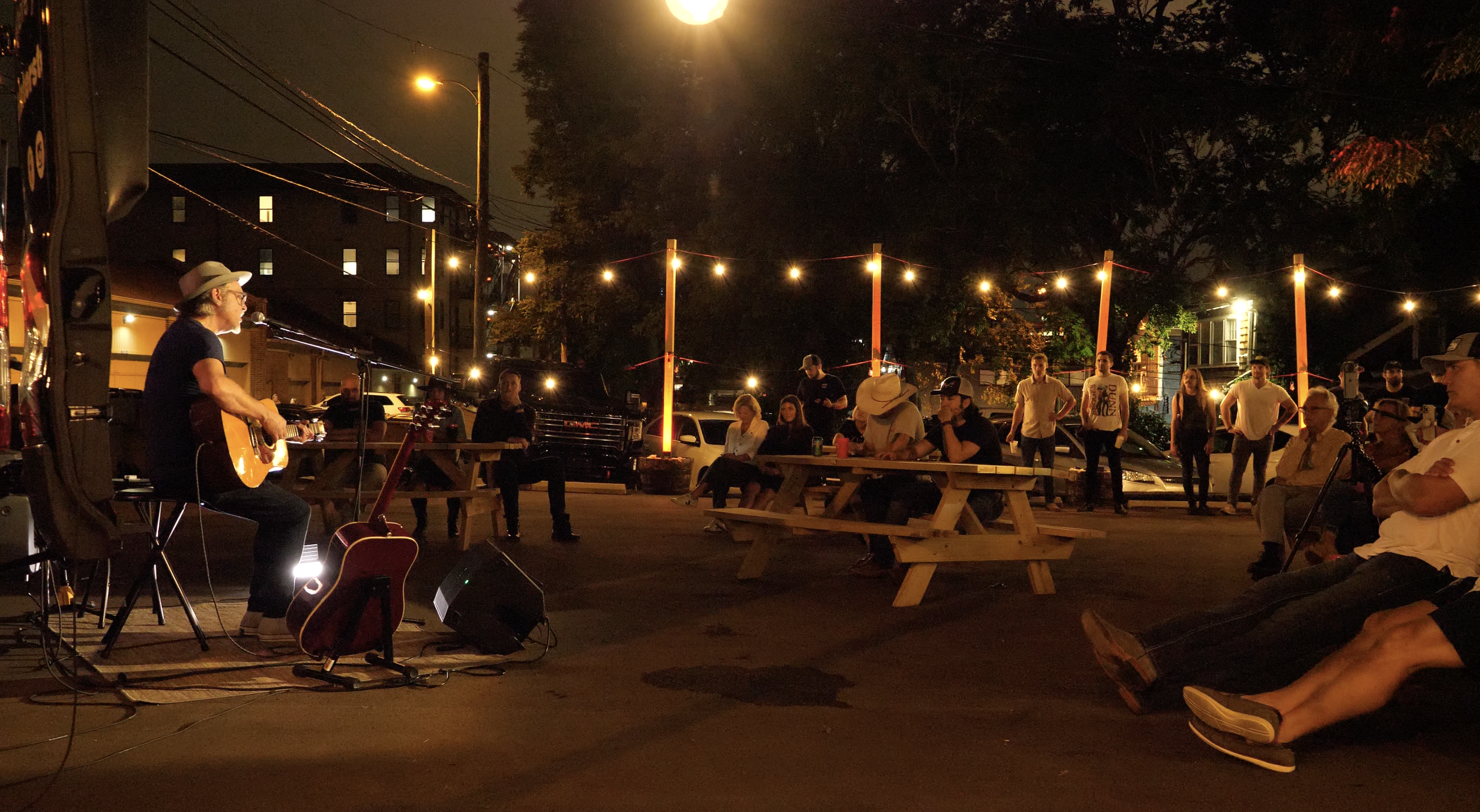
Jeff Trott performing at Van Jams in 2023.

Hosted at the Music Square location, Van Jams is an artist showcase where performers play original music using "The Van," Interstate Music's modified sprinter van that functions as a live venue and recording studio. Van Jams is appreciated for its uniqueness and sound quality, and is most-often attended by artists, managers, and employees in the music industry.

In August 2023, Van Jams hosted a one-time showcase called, "Legends Night," where famous songwriters performed their most well-known hits. The lineup included: Brice Long, Buddy Cannon, Greg Camp, Jeff Trott, Mark Nesler, and Marla Cannon-Goodman.

== Notable Artists and Songwriters ==
The following artists and songwriters have worked with Interstate Music or performed at Van Jams:

- Abby Anderson
- Austin Giorgio
- Brice Long
- Buddy Cannon
- Caleb Lee Hutchinson
- Dillon Carmichael
- Drake Milligan
- Eddie And The Getaway
- Greg Camp
- Jeff Trott
- Mark Nesler
- Marla Cannon-Goodman
- Phillip White
- Tony Martin

== Historical Involvement in Milwaukee's Music Community ==
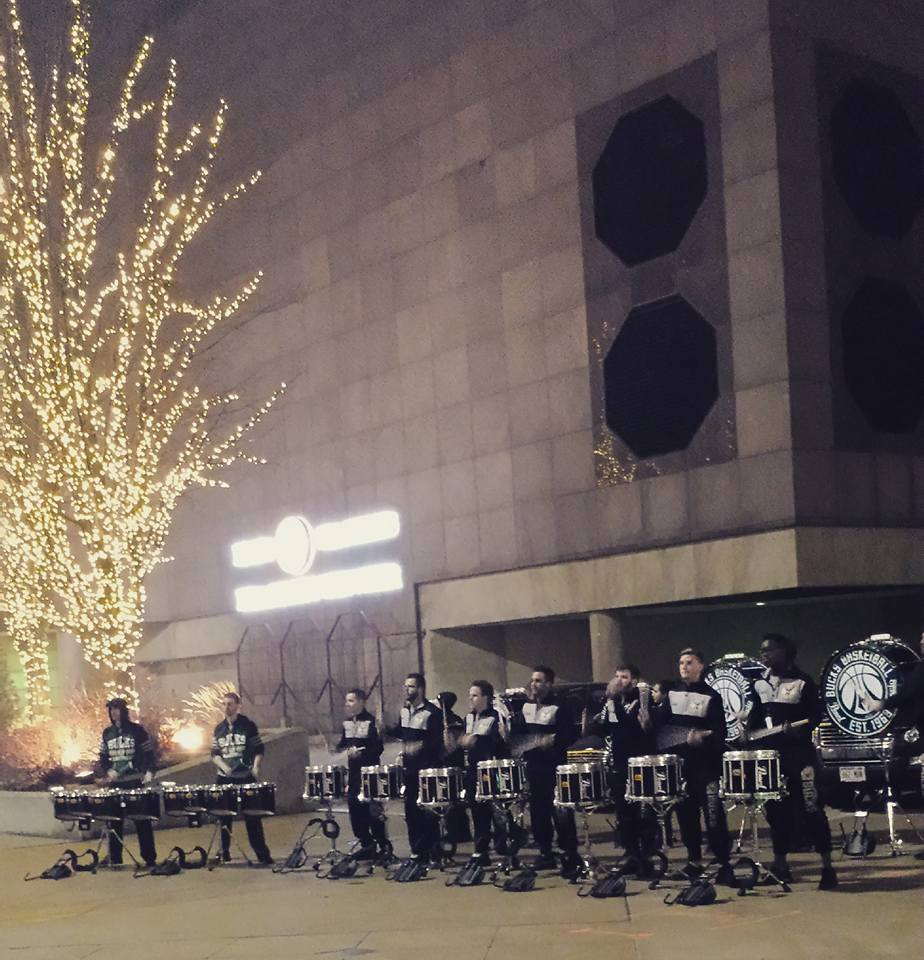
Milwaukee Bucks Beats Drumline performing outside of the BMO Harris Bradley Center before the Bucks defeat the Warriors on 12/12/15

Cascio Interstate Music was an active participant in southeastern Wisconsin's musical community, by providing free in-store educational/performance clinics with well-known musicians at the retail store. Cascio Interstate Music also entered into a partnership with the NBA's Milwaukee Bucks franchise to sponsor the "Bucks Beats" Drumline, which performed during Milwaukee Bucks home basketball games. Cascio Interstate Music also maintained relationships with the Stefanie H Weill Center for the Performing Arts, Sharon Lynne Wilson Center for the Arts, 88Nine Radio Milwaukee, and Milwaukee Record.

=== DrummerFest ===
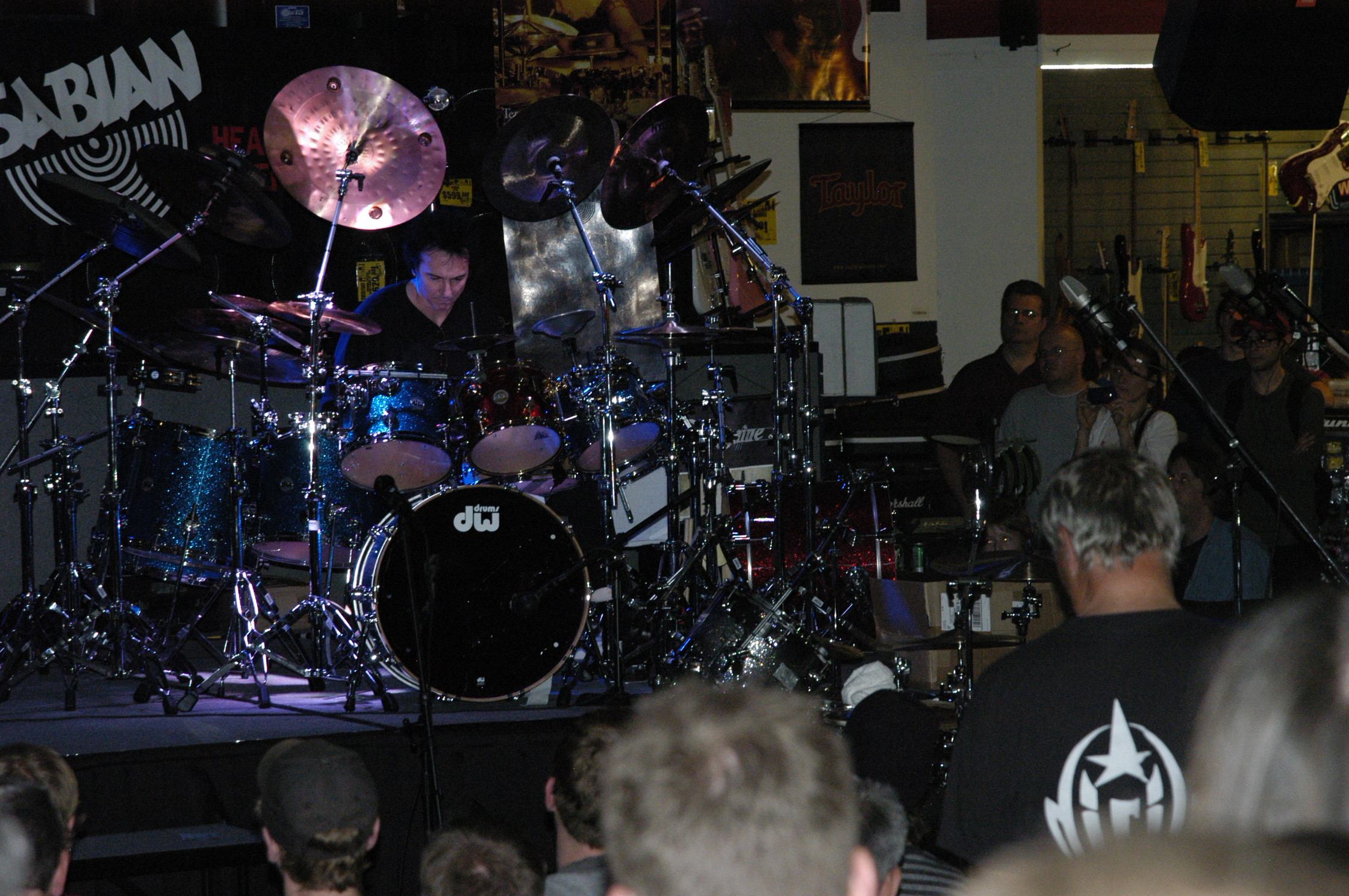
Terry Bozzio at DrummerFest in 2010

Cascio Interstate Music hosted DrummerFest, an annual drum clinic, from 2001-2019. The event featured notable drummers and percussionists from a variety of genres.

Year	Performers
2001	Zoro, Dom Famularo, Hilary Jones, Charlie Adams, Horacio "El Negro" Hernandez
2002	Hip Pickles, Tom Brechtlein, Dom Famularo, Kenny Aronoff
2003	Mike Mangini, Dom Famularo, Steve Ferrone, Steve Smith
2004	Johnny Rabb, Todd Sucherman, Cindy Blackman, Alex Acuña
2005	Peter Erskine, William Calhoun, Keith Carlock, Robby Ameen
2006	Billy Ward, Ignacio Berroa, Virgil Donati, Dom Famularo
2007	Paul Leim, Grant Collins, Teddy Campbell, Flo Mounier
2008	Johnny Rabb (Collective Soul), Jim Riley (Rascal Flatts), Marco Minnemann, Dennis Chambers (Carlos Santana)
2009	Hannah Ford (Prince), Rodney Holmes, Dafnis Prieto, Mike Mangini
2010	Bun E. Carlos (Cheap Trick), Terry Bozzio, Marvin McQuitty, Dom Famularo
2011	Bill Bruford, Chris Pennie, Aaron Spears (Usher), Horacio "El Negro" Hernandez
2012	Rex Hardy Jr (American Idol, Mary J Blige), Ben Sesar (Brad Paisley), John Blackwell, Gregg Bissonette
2013	Russ Miller, Gene Hoglan, Ronald Bruner Jr, Gavin Harrison
2014	Dom Famularo, Brian Frasier-Moore (Justin Timberlake, Madonna), Omar Hakim, Thomas Lang
2015	Peter Erskine, Glen Sobel, Sean Fuller (Florida Georgia Line), Raymond Massey, Glen Caruba
2016	Jimmy Chamberlin (Smashing Pumpkins, Jimmy Chamberlin Complex, Zwan, Skysaw, Jane's Addiction), Shannon Forrest (Taylor Swift, Carrie Underwood, Toby Keith, Faith Hill, Rascal Flatts, TOTO), Matt Garstka (Animals as Leaders, Tosin Abasi, Javier Reyes), Gorden Campbell (Earth Wind & Fire, Phillip Bailey, Rascal Flatts, George Duke, Beyonce, Jessica Simpson)
2017	Daru Jones (Jack White, Slum Village, Taleb Kweli, Black Mild), Joe Saylor (The Late Show with Stephen Colbert, John Batiste), Will Kennedy (Yellowjackets, Russell Ferrante)
2018	Dom Famularo, Antonio Sanchez (John Patitucci, Pat Metheny Group)
2019	Carter McLean, Gerald Heyward (Puff Daddy, Coolio, Beyoncé), Calvin Rodgers (Fred Hammond, R. Kelly, Kirk Franklin)
