= Agus Amàrach =

EP by Mistle Thrush
- Released: 1994
- Recorded: May 1994
- Genre: Alternative rock, ethereal goth
- Length: 24:48
- Label: Bedazzled

Professional ratings
Review scores
Source	Rating
Allmusic	4/5 stars
ARTISTdirect	4/5 stars

Agus Amàrach, an EP, is the first CD released by Mistle Thrush, a goth-identified band based in Boston, Massachusetts. It came out in 1994 on Washington, D.C.–based Bedazzled Records (catalog #BDZ19). It was followed by the band's debut full-length, Silt, in 1995. "Agus amàrach" is Celtic, and translates as "and tomorrow".

== Track listing ==
All songs written by Mistle Thrush

1. "Champion Jack" – 4:52
2. "Beside" – 4:31
3. "Escapades in Glass" – 4:29
4. "Stars Like Dust" – 3:40
5. "Six Hour Sunday" – 5:06

Note: there is 20 seconds of silence at the end of "Six Hour Sunday", followed by twenty-one tracks of silence (each ranging in length from 14 to 25 seconds), and then an untitled 2:10 ambient wash of sound (heavily effected guitars and piano) spread across five tracks (each ranging in length from 20 to 31 seconds).

== Personnel ==
=== The band ===
- Todd Demma – Percussion
- Valerie Forgione – vocals, acoustic guitar ("Stars Like Dust")
- Ruben Layman – Bass guitar
- Alice Lee Scott – Scopic, Spookadelic and eustasis guitars
- Brad Rigney – Guitars

=== Production ===
- Y. Mike – Producer

== Additional credits ==
- Recorded at The Studio
- Petrina Katsikas – Manager
- Rebecca Fagan – Design, photography
- Frank Fagan – Photography
- Mark MacElhiney – Photography
- "Mistle Thrush would like to thank: our families; Petrina; Y. Mike; Rebecca; Matt Kattman; Andrew Reynhout; Steve & Rob; Ann-Marie; Merry; Mike & Juliette; Justin & Todd & Beanie; John DeGregario; Mike Anderson; Christian; Dave Sheehan; Laurabelfry; Rob Finn; Mark MacElhiney; Annette; Rob; Sean; Joel Simches; T-Max; all the kind radio people, especially Juanita, Albert O, Phillip G, and Mikey Dee; Y. Mom & Marty; Chris Porter; Mike Stuto; and all who have believed in us along the way."

== Sources ==
- CD liner notes
