= Silt (album) =

Studio album by Mistle Thrush
- Released: 1995
- Genre: Rock, goth
- Label: Bedazzled
- Producer: Y. Mike; Mistle Thrush

Mistle Thrush chronology
Silt (1995)	Super Refraction (1997)

Professional ratings
Review scores
Source	Rating
Allmusic	4/5 stars

Silt is the debut album by Mistle Thrush, a Boston, Massachusetts-based band. It was released in 1995 on CD by Bedazzled (catalog #BDZ26). The previous year, the band released a five-song EP titled Agus Amàrach. The band didn't release another full-length album until 1997's Super Refraction. Silt saw original guitarist Brad Rigney (departed to Big Monster Fish Hook) replaced by former teenage hardcore semi-star, Matthew Kattman (ex-Funny Wagon/Kingpin).

== Track listing ==
All tracks written by Mistle Thrush, except where noted.

1. "Freshwater" – 2:14
2. "Flowereyed" – 4:20
3. "One Sixth" – :42
4. "Cicada" – 5:51 (Todd Demma, Valerie Forgione, Matthew Kattman, Ruben Layman, Scott Patalano, Brad Rigney)
5. "Overpass" – 4:20
6. "Some Poet" – 5:02
7. "Wake Up (The Sleep Song)" – 5:59
8. "Silt" – 1:04
9. "Red Caboose" – 4:01
10. "Shine Away" – 6:20
11. "The Sky and My Hands" – 5:22 (Demma, Forgione, Kattman, Layman, Patalano, Rigney)
12. "The Honey Trip" – 9:26
13. "Bloom" – 3:20

== Personnel ==
=== Mistle Thrush ===
- Todd Demma – Drums, percussion
- Valerie Forgione – Vocals, acoustic guitar, xylophone, drums ("The Sky and My Hands")
- Matthew Kattman – Electric and acoustic guitar, bass guitar ("The Sky and My Hands")
- Ruben Layman – Bass guitar
- Alice Lee Scott – Electric and acoustic guitar, drums ("The Sky and My Hands")

=== Additional musicians ===
- Mark White – Double bass ("Overpass")

=== Production ===
- Y. Mike – Producer, mixing
- Mistle Thrush – Producer, mixing
- Jon Williams – Assistant engineer
- Dan McLaughlin – Assistant engineer
- David Lefkowitz – Assistant engineer
- Marc LaFleur – Assistant engineer
- Mike Sielewicz – Engineer

== Additional credits ==
- Recorded at Fort Apache, Cambridge, Massachusetts and The Studio
- Mixed at Prophet Sound and The Studio
- Mastered at M Works
- Rebecca Fagan – Design
- Matthew Kattman – Illustration
- Petrina Katsikas – Manager
