= Opium Den =

Opium Den may refer to:

- Opium den, an establishment, common in the 19th century, where opium was sold and smoked
- Opium Den (band), a 1990s American gothic rock band
- The Opium Den, a 1947 Italian crime film
