= Open Hand (disambiguation) =

Open hand may refer to:

- Open Hand is an American rock band.
- Project Open Hand, a not-for-profit entity
- Open-handed drumming, a method of playing percussion

== See also ==
- "Hands Open", a song by Snow Patrol
