= Famularo =

Famularo is a surname. Notable people with the surname include:

- Alessandro Famularo (born 2003), Venezuelan racing driver
- Dom Famularo (1953–2023), American drummer
