= Clown Core =

American musical duo

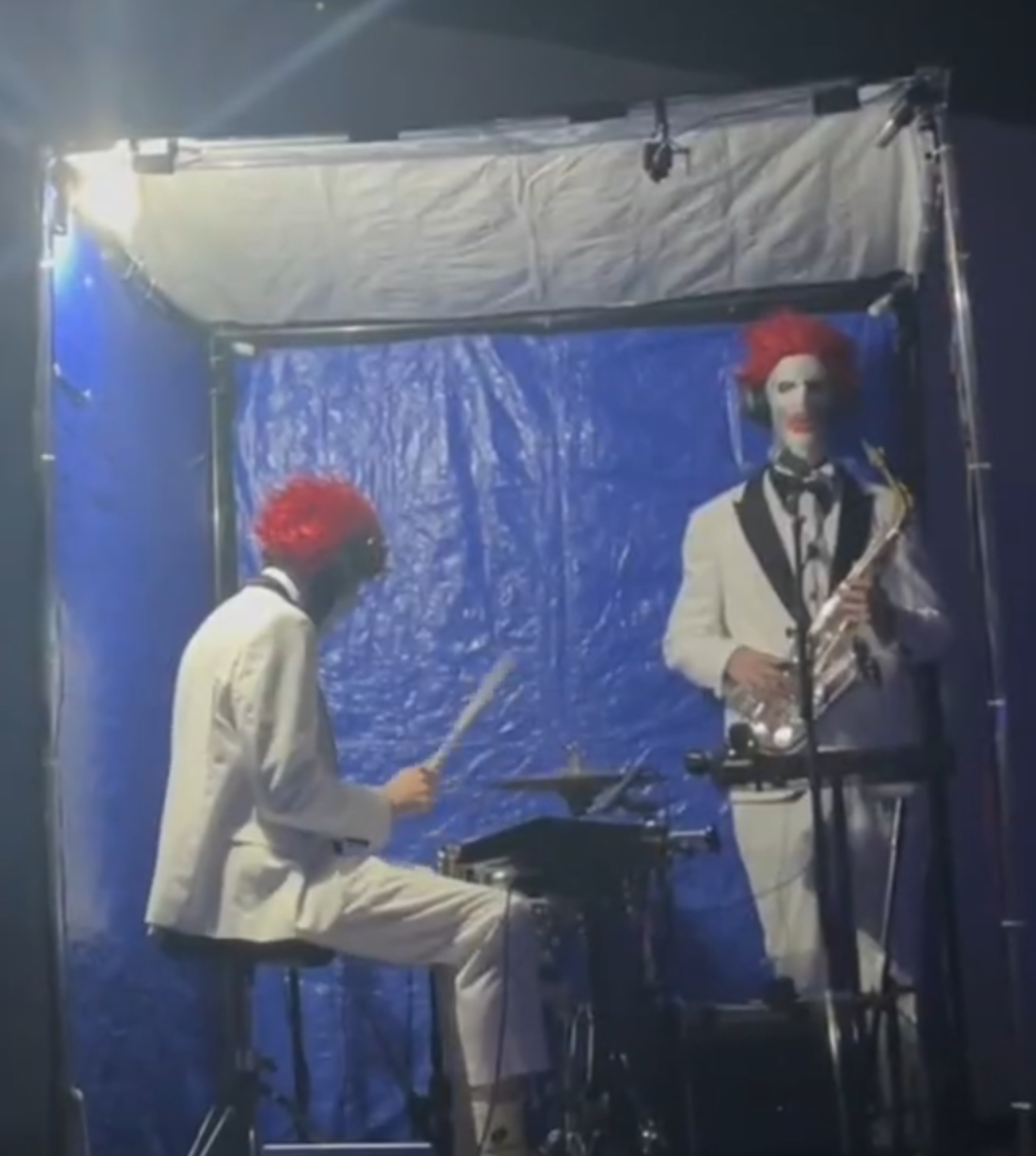
- Clown Core playing live in 2023

Background information
- Genres: Grindcore; jazz; electronica; avant-garde; extreme metal
- Years active: 2008–2011; 2017–present
- Members: Louis Cole (speculated); Sam Gendel (speculated)
- Website: clowncore.computer

Clown Core (stylized as ClownC0re) is an American experimental music duo. The band is composed of two anonymous artists who wear clown masks, speculated to be drummer Louis Cole of the indietronica and jazzfunk band Knower and Sam Gendel, a saxophonist and frequent Cole collaborator.

Clown Core's music has been described as avant-garde and difficult to categorize, incorporating a wide array of genres and styles including grindcore, jazz, noise music and extreme metal, often abruptly transitioning between styles within songs. Most of the band's songs are very short, with few lasting longer than two minutes. Their eponymous album Clown Core was released in 2010. After a seven-year hiatus, the band returned with second album Toilet in 2018, followed by third album Van in 2020. The EP 1234 released in 2021. Their projects are all self-released.

== History ==
Clown Core's YouTube channel was created in November 2008. Their first video is a performance of their song "Surreal Cereal" from their Clown Core album. They released their eponymous debut album Clown Core in March 2010.

After uploading on their channel semi-frequently, they disappeared completely in 2011. After three years of complete silence, they uploaded a video titled "?" that featured the question "What happened to Clowncore" in red text. They then disappeared again for another three years before returning with a video titled "º" which featured audio of a spectrogram featuring the clowns with bold text on the top that read "WE ARE IN A TOILET", along with morse code at the end which when decoded read "WE ARE STILL ALIVE". They uploaded two more teasers, videos titled "i" and "≈".

After eight years, their second album Toilet released in March 2018, accompanied by music videos of them performing the tracks in a portable toilet. These music videos were also shown on Adult Swim's Smalls program, exposing them to a wider audience. Celia Woitas of the German magazine Metal Hammer described the music as "far removed from any music genre". In his review of the song "Hell" (2018) and analysis of the accompanying music video, Axl Rosenberg of heavy metal news website MetalSucks called the project "a masterpiece of modern art" and described the song as "genre-defying". Mick R. of New Noise Magazine shared the latter view: "Clown Core simply defies categorization."

In August 2020, the duo uploaded a video titled "infinite realm of incomprehensible suffering", featuring new music and audio at the end which features another spectrogram that shows the clowns along with bold text at the top which reads "IT HAS BEGUN", teasing a new project. In September 2020, they released their third album Van, accompanied by music videos for all the tracks, showcasing them playing the music in a 1997 Toyota Previa minivan while an unknown driver wearing a balaclava mask drives them to various locations. Sarena Kuhn of The Daily Californian in her review of the album described the duo as "a talented duo of musicians with a gimmick or even your own worst nightmare, they are undeniably difficult to ignore."

On October 2, 2020, ClownCore released their website "clowncore.computer"

In April 2021, they released their first EP 1234.

On the July 1, 2022, a video titled "clown core tour" would be released to the clown core YouTube channel, announcing that they would be touring North America and Europe.

On September 24, a video titled "cc tour 2" would be released to the clown core YouTube channel, announcing that they would be touring North America and Europe again, while this time they would play in Japan as well.

Clown Core performing in 2025

On the February 15, 2024, the full London live show was uploaded to the clown core YouTube channel, although it had to be censored due to the visuals containing gore and pornographic content.

== Discography ==
- Clown Core (2010)
- Toilet (2018)
- Van (2020)
- 1234 (2021)
- Live (2024)
