= Knower Forever =

2023 studio album by Knower

Studio album by Knower
- Released: June 2, 2023
- Recorded: 2023
- Genres: Avant-pop; electronic; funk; jazz
- Length: 44:22 (45:33 with bonus track)
- Label: Self-released
- Producer: Louis Cole

Knower chronology
Life (2016)	Knower Forever (2023)

Singles from Knower Forever
- 1. "I'm the President" Released: May 1, 2023; 2. "The Abyss" Released: May 17, 2023; 3. "Crash the Car" Released: June 2, 2023

Knower Forever is the fifth studio album by American independent electronic jazz-funk duo Knower. Recording took place in 2023, with member Louis Cole handling production. Musically, the album features an experimental sound with avant-pop and jazz-funk whilst continuing their theme of humorous and vulgar lyrics. It was self-released on Bandcamp in June 2023 and promoted with a series of home-made videos, which preceded distribution onto streaming platforms in October 2023. The album positive reviews from critics, who highlighted its musicality and variety.

== Recording ==
After the independent electronic jazz-funk duo Knower released their fourth studio album Life (2016), they expanded their sound and began to perform as a live band with additional supporting musicians. Members Louis Cole and Genevieve Artadi enlisted musicians David Binney, Sam Gendel, Thom Gill, Dennis Hamm, Jacob Mann, Rai Thistlethwayte, and Sam Wilkes. Knower Forever was eventually conceived and recorded at Cole's house sometime in 2023. It features performances from dozens of musicians, creating a big band sound and contrasting the production process of the duo's previous efforts, which were performed exclusively by them.

== Release ==
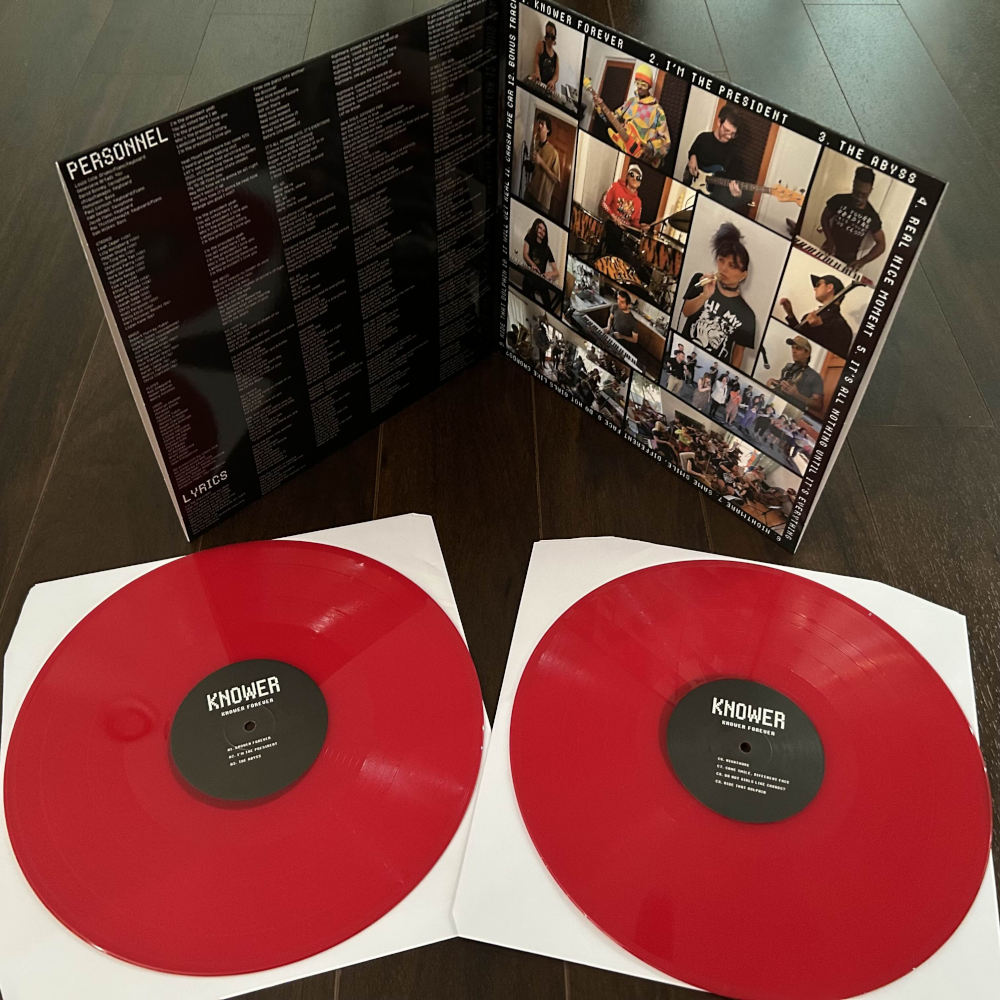
The success of Knower Forever led to a limited vinyl campaign.

Knower announced the release of Knower Forever in May 2023 as a Bandcamp exclusive, citing low payment from Spotify and other streaming services as their reason for doing so. "I'm the President", "The Abyss", and "Crash the Car" were released as singles that month to promote the album, alongside a series of music videos with a DIY style the band is known for. The album was released on June 2, 2023, followed by a vinyl campaign and distribution onto streaming platforms in October of that same year.

== Reception ==
Knower Forever received positive reviews from critics and, by Cole and Artadi's account, "made a shitload of money". Zoe Camp of Bandcamp Daily rated it as one of the best albums of 2023, believing the duo "are certainly at home basking in muzak's creature comforts, from the hermetically sealed vocals of city pop to the tonal warmth of smooth jazz." James Rettig of Stereogum praised its "alternately squelching and smooth" sound, instrumentation, and Artadi's confident vocal performances. James Sissler of Live for Live Music similarly highlighted its musical variety, observing switches from "aggressively funky and unashamedly silly" compositions to songs with "breathtaking melodies and epic orchestration". Writers of Song Bar summarized it as a "jazz-funk tour de force LP of outstanding musicianship, infinite energy, humour and invention".

Vocalist Tony Wolski of the Armed called Knower Forever one of his favorite albums of 2023, stating that "Louis Cole is an absolute force on drums. But Genevieve Artadi is the unsung MVP of this, making effortless melodies that get stuck in your head for days out of such unprecious, understated staccato utterances." Drummer Mike Portnoy of Dream Theater discovered the record in 2024, and remarked that it became an "absolute favorite" of his thereafter.

== Track listing ==
All tracks are written by Louis Cole and Genevieve Artadi.

No.	Title	Length
1.	"Knower Forever"	2:26
2.	"I'm the President"	4:07
3.	"The Abyss"	3:02
4.	"Real Nice Moment"	4:31
5.	"It's All Nothing Until It's Everything"	5:08
6.	"Nightmare"	5:50
7.	"Same Smile, Different Face"	2:15
8.	"Do Hot Girls Like Chords"	3:32
9.	"Ride That Dolphin"	3:28
10.	"It Will Get Real"	4:26
11.	"Crash the Car"	5:36
12.	"Bonus Track" (Bandcamp exclusive)	1:11
Total length:		45:33

== Personnel ==
Credits are adapted from the liner notes of Knower Forever.

Knower

- Louis Cole – drums, piano, keyboard, production, mixing, mastering
- Genevieve Artadi – vocals

Primary musicians

- David Binney – saxophone
- chiquitamagic – keyboard
- MonoNeon – bass
- Paul Cornish – keyboard, piano
- Sam Gendel – saxophone
- Jacob Mann – keyboard
- Rai Thistlethwayte – keyboard, piano
- Sam Wilkes – bass

Additional musicians

- Leah Zeger – violin
- Lily Honigberg – violin
- Megan Shung – violin
- Yu-Ting Wu – violin
- Chrysanthe Tan – violin
- Sabrina Parry – violin
- Nora Germain – violin
- Tylana Renga – violin
- Tom Lea – viola
- Ethan Moffitt – viola
- Daniel Jacobs – viola
- Lauren Baba – viola
- Isaiah Gage – cello
- Chris Votek – cello
- Niall Ferguson – cello
- Emily Elkin – cello
- Karl McComas-Reichl – bass
- Logan Kane – bass
- Robert Murray – tuba
- Corbin Jones – sousaphone
- Kyle Richter – sousaphone
- Jon Hatamiya – trombone
- Vikram Devasthali – trombone
- Mariel Austin – trombone
- Nick Platoff – bass trombone
- Aidan Lombard – trumpet
- Aaron Janik – trumpet
- Andris Mattson – trumpet
- Chris Clarkson – trumpet
- Rob Sheppard – flute
- Amber Navran – flute
- Henry Solomon – flute
- Kathryn Shuman – choir
- Mikaela Elson – choir
- Dyasono – choir
- Micaela Tobin – choir
- Jessica Freedman – choir
- Rayah Clarkson – choir
- Alexandra Domingo – choir
- Sharon Kim – choir
- Linnea Sablosky – choir
- Katharine Eames – choir
- Glynis Davies – choir
- Michael Kohl – choir
- Jeff Eames – choir
- VJ Rosales – choir
- Brett McDermid – choir
- Luc Kleiner – choir
- Sean Fitzpatrick – choir
