= Duncan Arsenault =

American musician (born 1974)

- Duncan Arsenault drumming with The Curtain Society, October 2006

Background information
- Born: August 28, 1974 (age 52)
- Origin: Worcester, Massachusetts, United States
- Genres: Rock, funk, pop, country, folk, electronic music, alternative
- Instruments: Drums, guitar, bass guitar, piano, electronic music
- Member of: The Curtain Society, The Marshall Pass, The Curtis Mayflower
- Website: www.duncanarsenault.com

Duncan Charles Arsenault (born August 28, 1974, in Worcester, Massachusetts, U.S.) is a multi-instrumentalist and the drummer for the American rock bands the Curtis Mayflower, the Curtain Society, Sam James, Big Eyed Rabbit, and Scott Ricciuti & Pistol Whipped. His solo electronic music project has been featured on the CBS television programs NCIS and The Young and the Restless. The Marshall Pass's music will appear in the independent film American Mongrel.

== Collaborations ==
Arsenault has played drums with Shana Morrison, daughter of Van Morrison, with author, poet, and musician Jim Carroll, and Mark Burgess from the Chameleons.

== Discography ==
=== Brooks Milgate and Duncan Arsenault ===
- Euphonium (single) - Sept 30 2026
- Panta Rhei (single) - August 28 2026
- Desire Path (single) - June 24 2026
- Mono No Aware (single) - May 27 2026

=== The Curtis Mayflower ===
- You Could be the Mountain (single) - August 2023
- Death Hoax - 2017
- Fourth Wall (single) - 2014
- King of the Fools (single) - 2014
- American Mongrel Soundtrack Album - 2014
- Everything Beautiful Is Under Attack - January 2014
- Live at The Dive EP February 2013

=== The Marshall Pass ===
- Wordless Prayer August 18, 2020
- Ghost Land September 15, 2019
- Angel Dream (Tom Petty cover) (single) February 2018
- No Second Thoughts (Tom Petty cover) (single) February 2018
- Maggie (single) April 2015
- Phantom Train December 2012

=== Trav & Sky ===
- Worse Day (single) - Austoberfest 2025 Compilation - Sept 2026

=== Ash & Eric ===
- Chasing the Light (single) - May 2024

=== Nicole Sutka ===
- Next - July 2023

=== Gracie Day ===
- Read The Room - June 2023

=== Cowboy & Lady ===
- Take Me To Town - April 2016

=== Sam James ===
- Fix This Mess (single) - November 2012

=== Big Eyed Rabbit ===
- Live At The Stomping Ground - November 2013
- Big Eyed Rabbit - August 2012

=== Scott Ricciuti & Pistol Whipped ===
- Like The Red Haunts The Wine - April 2012

=== Beg, Scream & Shout! ===
- No Amount of Alcohol and Beg Scream & Shout! - April 2011

=== James Keyes ===
- To The Earth (Volume IV, Estival) - 2017
- To The Earth (Volume III, Vernal) - 2017
- To The Earth (Volume II, Hibernal) - 2017
- To The Earth (Volume I, Autumnal) - 2017
- The Middle - 2013
- Devil Take The Hindmost - 2011

=== Zack Borer ===
- Home - May 2007

=== The Al Arsenault Blues Band ===
- Hat Full of Blues - 2007

=== The Curtain Society ===
==== Albums ====
- Every Corner of the Room - Orcaphat Records - 2005
- Life is Long, Still - Bedazzled Records - 1996
- Inertia - Bedazzled Records - 1995

==== EPs ====
- Volume, Tone, Tempo - Bedazzled Records - 2000

==== Singles, compilations ====
- Birds Fly Information, Boston Does Boston Vol 1&2, 2013
- Every Corner of the Room - Worcester Magazine Turtle Boy Music Awards CD 2008
- Sleigh Ride - A Very Local Christmas 2003, Bedazzled Records X-Mas Disc 1997
- No Wonder - It's Your Local Music 2002
- Plaster - Several Bands Galore - Claire Records 1998
- Swing/Evanston - Splashed with Many a Speck - Dewdrops Records 1997
- Riverful Losing Today Magazine 1997
- Mouthwithout (version 2) - Nigh - Castle von Buhler Records 1997
- Mouthwithout b/w Swamp Thing - 7" vinyl - Bedazzled Records 1997
- Ferris Wheel - Radio Hepcats Vol. 1 1996
- Gravity - Anon - Castle von Buhler Records 1995
- Cradle - Woke Up Smiling - Bedazzled Records 1995
- Love Ends - Soon - Castle von Buhler Records 1994

=== Other appearances ===
- Solo - God Rest Ye Merry Gentlemen A Very Local Christmas 2003
- Drums - Mike Duffy 'Destined to be a Rumor' (cd)
- Drums - Daniel Roughan (cd)
- Drums - Tim Hansen 'Bless My Soul' (cd)
- Drums - Denis Coughlan (cd)

== Additional information ==
- Voted 1 of the 26 people to watch in 2006 in The Pulse Magazine.
- Worcester Magazine Interview July 2010
