= Super Refraction =

Studio album by Mistle Thrush
- Released: 1997
- Genre: Alternative rock, Dream pop
- Label: Egg
- Producer: Kurt Ralske; Mistle Thrush

Mistle Thrush chronology
Silt (1995)	Super Refraction (1997)	Drunk With You (2002)

Professional ratings
Review scores
Source	Rating
Allmusic	link
Boston Herald	Favorable April 18, 1997
ARTISTdirect	link
Good Citizen	Favorable Issue 7

Super Refraction is the second full-length album by former Boston, Massachusetts band Mistle Thrush. It was released in 1997 by Egg Records (catalog #7001).

== Track listing ==
All songs written by Mistle Thrush

1. "Stupid Song" – 3:12
2. "Moth-Like" – 4:00
3. "It's All Like Today" – 5:00
4. "Yellow Day" – 4:25
5. "51 Pegasi: Rocketship V.2" – 2:39
6. "Do You Know This Bird?" – 3:06
7. "All Mirror Thing" – 3:39
8. "Train Song" – 4:53
9. "Escapades in Glass" – 4:23
10. "Sha Sha" – 5:55
11. "Making Salt With Sunshine" – 2:22

note: at the end of "Making Salt With Sunshine", there's 1:30 of silence followed by a 22:32 sound collage pieced together from samples of the singer's vocals, crafted by producer Kurt Ralske.

== Personnel ==
=== The band ===
- Todd Demma — Drums, percussion
- Valerie Forgione — Vocals, analog keyboards, Theremin, acoustic guitar
- Matthew Kattman — Electric and acoustic guitar, back-up vocals ("Moth Like")
- Ruben Layman — Bass guitar, back-up vocals ("Moth Like")
- Alice Lee Scott — Electric guitar, vocals ("All Mirror Thing")

=== Production ===
- Kurt Ralske — Producer, engineer, mixing
- Mistle Thrush — Producer
- Vaughan Merrick — Engineer, mixing
- Chris Athens — Mastering

== Additional credits ==
- Recorded at Zabriskie Point, New York City
- Mastered at Sony Music Studios, New York City
- Valerie Forgione — Artwork, design
- "Special thanks to Kurt for the secret track. Ssshhh…"
- C. Richard Kattman — Photography
- Matthew Kattman — Layout and design ("With a little help from Valerie")

== Sources ==
- CD liner notes
