= Drunk with You =

Studio album by Mistle Thrush
- Released: February 2002
- Genres: Alternative rock, Dream pop
- Label: Ecstatic
- Producers: Andrew Schneider; Mistle Thrush

Mistle Thrush chronology
Super Refraction (1997)	Drunk with You (2002)

Professional ratings
Review scores
Source	Rating
The Boston Globe	(favorable)
Splendid	(favorable)
PopMatters	(favorable)

Drunk with You is the third and final album by Boston's Mistle Thrush. It was released on the Los Angeles–based Ecstatic Records label (catalog #XTC 001) in 2002. In the 5-year interim between their previous album, Super Refraction, and this one, they lost their second guitarist and changed bassists.

== Track listing ==
All songs written by Mistle Thrush

1. "Small" – 3:34
2. "3 Girls Walking" – 3:23
3. "Fanfare Spark" – 3:25
4. "Enginehead" – 2:51
5. "Heavy-Set John" – 3:10
6. "Lillies" – 5:26
7. "Give a Little Love" – 3:20
8. "Jody Stone" – 4:02
9. "Neil Diamond" – 2:58
10. "Drowning for William" – 4:30
11. "Birdmouth" – 6:46
12. "God's Enemies" – 4:13

== Personnel ==
=== The band ===
- Todd Demma – Drums, percussion, loops, acoustic guitar ("Neil Diamond")
- Valerie Forgione – Vocals, keyboards, Theremin, acoustic guitar, Japanese watch
- Alice Lee Scott – Electric and acoustic guitar, keyboard ("Enginehead")
- Matt Klain – Bass guitar, trombone, jaw harp, acoustic guitar ("Drowning for William")

=== Production ===
- Andrew Schneider – Producer, mixing
- Mistle Thrush – Producer, additional engineering, overdubs, editing
- Matthew Klain – Additional engineering, overdubs, editing
- Bruce McFarlane – Engineer
- Colin Decker – Mastering
- Matthew Azevedo – Mastering assistance
- Bert Foster – Mastering assistance

== Additional credits ==
- Basic tracking at Q Division Studios, December 1998 – January 1999, June 2001
- Mixed at New Alliance Studios
- Mastered at M Works Mastering Studios
- Aaron Turner (for Hydra Head Industries) – Art, design

== Sources ==
- CD liner notes
