= Pollyn =

American electronic music group

- Origin: Los Angeles, California, USA
- Genres: Electronic music
- Years active: 1998-present
- Members: Adam Weissman; Genevieve Artadi; Anthony Cava

Pollyn is an American electronic music group, formed in 1998 in Los Angeles, California. The band consists of Adam Weissman (production, samples, percussion, synth), Genevieve Artadi (lead vocals, bass, keyboard), and Anthony Cava (guitar).

Pollyn's debut EP Songs for Sale was released in 2003. Their first full-length album This Little Night was self-released in 2009. This Little Night produced subsequent remix records that included French dubstep producer Débruit, local Low End Theorist Nosaj Thing, grimy hip-hop producer Sid Roams, and Stones Throw-signed funkster James Pants. Pollyn's sophomore album Living in Patterns was released in 2011. The album garnered attention from local radio and news outlets such as KCRW and the Los Angeles Times for its strong afro-beat influences as well as drawing comparisons to groups such as Portishead, Blonde Redhead, and Gorillaz. The group has cited Talking Heads as a major influence.

== History ==
Pollyn was founded by Adam Weissman in 1998 alongside Genevieve Artadi and Anthony Cava in Los Angeles, California.

== Remixes ==
During the course of producing their debut album, Pollyn began making remixes for groups such as Gorillaz, Liquid Liquid, Buffalo Daughter, and Death from Above. Pollyn has since then remixed tracks for HEALTH and Belleruch. Pollyn's own material has also been the subject of extensive remixes by artists such as Moodymann, DJ Harvey, Larry Gus, Nosaj Thing, Sid Roams, Them Jeans, Alchemist, Matthew Herbert, Peter Visti, and Exile.

== Collaborators ==
Pollyn has collaborated in the past with artists such as Roc Marciano and Freddie Gibbs.

== Discography ==
- Songs for Sale (2003)
- This Little Night (2009)
- Living in Patterns (2011)
- Distress Signals (2016)
