= The Curtis Mayflower =

American rock band

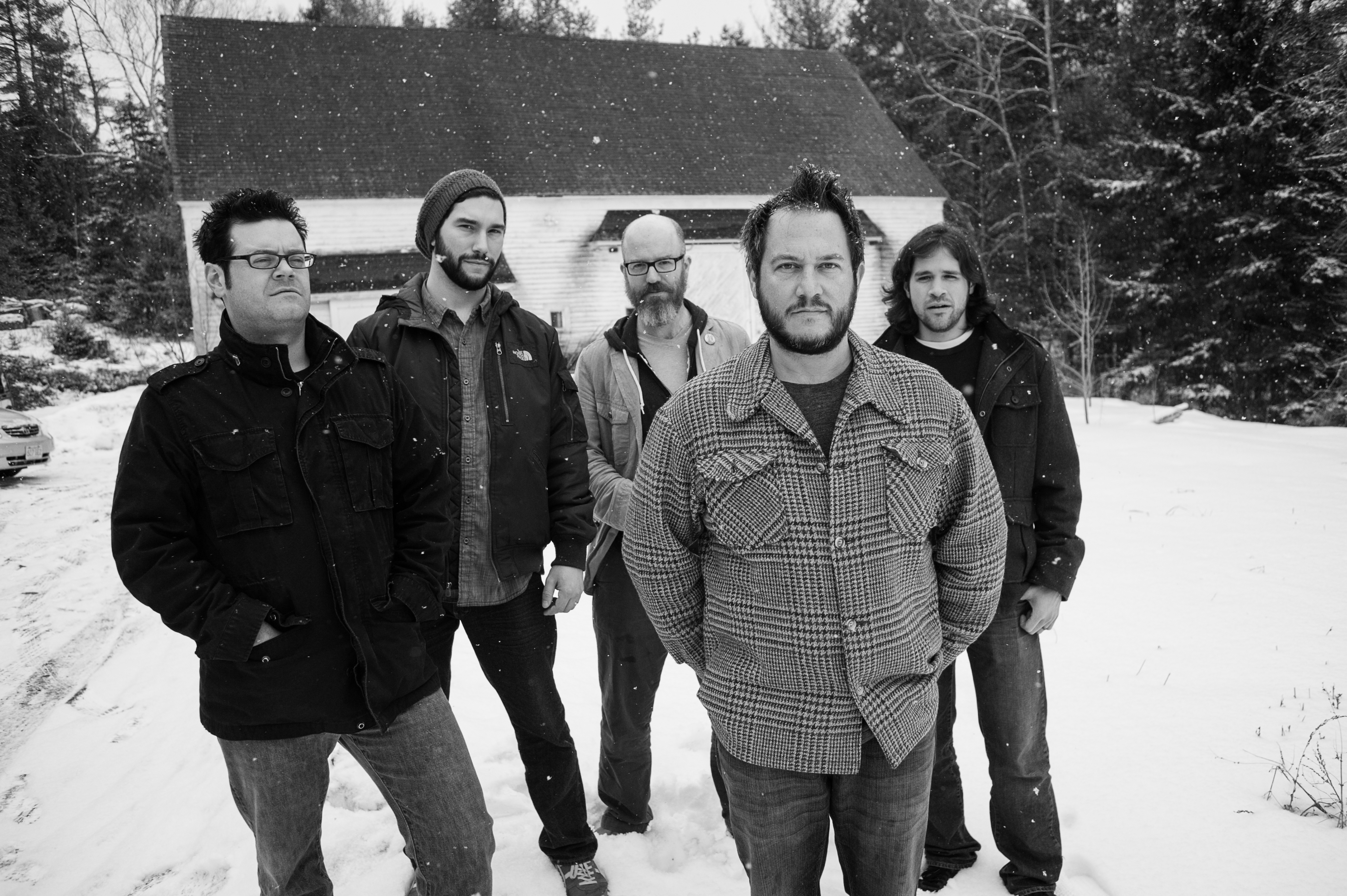
- The Curtis Mayflower in Lamoine, ME 2013

Background information
- Origin: Worcester, MA, US
- Genres: rock, blues rock, soul music
- Years active: 2012–present
- Members: Jeremy Moses Curtis; Duncan Arsenault; Pete Aleksi; Brooks Milgate; Craig Rawding
- Website: www.thecurtismayflower.com

The Curtis Mayflower is an American rock band formed in Worcester, Massachusetts in 2013. The group consists of lead singer Craig Rawding, guitarist Pete Aleksi, bassist Jeremy Moses Curtis, keyboard player Brooks Milgate, and drummer Duncan Arsenault.

The group's debut album "Everything Beautiful Is Under Attack" was released on January 28, 2014. In March 2017 the band released their sophomore album "Death Hoax" to positive reviews.

== History ==
Before starting The Curtis Mayflower, Brooks Milgate, Duncan Arsenault and Jeremy Moses Curtis played together in The Howl with The Fabulous Thunderbirds guitarist Troy Gonyea. While playing The Howl, Curtis and Gonyea began touring with Booker T. Jones. Curtis also toured internationally as the bassist for Howie Day and has also performed with Levon Helm and Ringo Starr. Duncan Arsenault played drums with Jim Carroll for a series of performances as The Catholic Boys. He has also performed with singer Mark Burgess from The Chameleons UK and is the drummer for The Curtain Society. Craig Rawding also sings in the duo The Marshall Pass with Duncan Arsenault.

The band was formed in Worcester, MA while playing at a local bar's weekly music series. All five band members have played together in various incarnations but it wasn't until 2012 that this lineup solidified and began playing together as a group. After a few shows playing old soul and blues, the group began writing original material. This led to the self-released EP "Live at The Dive", recorded at the bar they formed at.

In February 2013 the band rented a farmhouse in Lamoine, ME and hired engineer Dave Westner to record their debut album. The music was recorded live in a room with little to no separation among the instruments and minimal overdubs.

In 2014, they recorded the soundtrack for the film American Mongrel. Joining the group for these sessions was saxophonist Dana Colley of the band Morphine.

== Members ==
- Craig Rawding - vocals, harmonica
- Duncan Arsenault - drums
- Jeremy Moses Curtis - bass, vocals
- Pete Aleksi - guitar, vocals
- Brooks Milgate - keyboards, vocals

== Discography ==
- Death Hoax (2017)
- "Fourth Wall (single)" (2014)
- "King of the Fools (single)" (2014)
- Everything Beautiful Is Under Attack (2014)
- Live at The Dive EP (2013)

== Videography ==
Year	Title	Album
2017	"Ghost Town"	'Death Hoax'
2017	"The Killer Inside Me"	'Death Hoax'
2014	"Fourth Wall"	'Fourth Wall' (single)
2014	"King of the Fools"	'King of the Fools' (single)
2014	"Paraselene"	Everything Beautiful is Under Attack (LP)
2014	"Everything Beautiful Is Under Attack"	American Mongrel Soundtrack (LP)
