= Mistle Thrush (band) =

American rock band

- Origin: Boston, Massachusetts, U.S.
- Genres: Alternative rock, ethereal wave, gothic rock
- Years active: 1993–2002
- Labels: Bedazzled, Egg, Ecstatic, Underground, Inc.
- Members: Todd Demma: Drums, percussion Valerie Forgione: Vocals, acoustic guitar, keyboards, Theremin; Alice Lee Scott: Acoustic and electric guitar
- Past members: Matthew Kattman: Guitar; Matthew Klain: Bass guitar Ruben Layman: Bass guitar Brad Rigney: Guitar
- Website: mistlethrush.com

Mistle Thrush was a female-fronted 1990s alternative rock band based in Boston, Massachusetts. They've been described by the Boston Herald as The Cure-meets-Fairport Convention. Steve Morse of The Boston Globe wrote that Valerie Forgione, the band's singer, has "some of the most versatile pipes since the dream-pop heyday of Kate Bush" and that the "band remains a local treasure". During the band's heyday, their songs frequently charted in CMJ's Top 200. According to the band's website, they're on hiatus but their last album was released in February 2002. In January 2011, they reunited to play their first concert since 2003. Forgione's current project is called Lovina Falls.

== History ==
Formed in 1993 by guitarists Alice Lee Scott and Brad Rigney, bassist Ruben Layman, drummer Todd Demma and Forgione (ex-Funeral Party, Twelve Tone Failure), Mistle Thrush took their name from a bird that eats the poisonous-to-most berries of the mistletoe plant. Generally identified as goth—although the term, as The Phoenix's Brett Milano later put it, "never quite suited them"—quickly found a home at Washington, D.C.'s Bedazzled Records, who released the band's debut 7" in 1994. Later that same year, they released a 5-song CD entitled Agus Amàrach.

In May 1995 they advanced as far as the semi-finals of the 17th annual WBCN Rock & Roll Rumble; by the time they put out their full-length debut (1995's Silt), Rigney had been replaced by former teenage Boston hardcore semi-star Matthew Kattman (ex-Funny Wagon, Kingpin).

Two years later, they released Super Refraction on the "fake" indie label, Egg Records (bankrolled by major label Elektra). The album landed them on the Boston Herald's "Local Best of 1997" list, with music critic Tristram Lozaw declaring it to be "[s]ilky smart pop with sublime sonics". The album was nominated for a Boston Music Award for Indie Label Album of the Year, with Forgione also being nominated for Outstanding Local Female Vocalist.

Signing a publishing deal with Warner-Chappell Music, they ultimately used most of the advance money buying out the remainder of their 5-album contract with Egg, with whom they'd become increasingly disillusioned.

During this time-period, band members involved themselves with other creative outlets since the band's recording career was effectively on hold. Forgione received positive reviews for her turn as Mary Magdalene in the Boston Rock Opera's 2000 production of Jesus Christ Superstar. Jim Sullivan noted in the Boston Globe that Forgione "shines during her featured numbers" and that she "belt[s] out... [the] songs in a manner far from her work with... Mistle Thrush."

All of the legal wrangling involved in extracting themselves from their contract took its toll on the band and Kattman and Layman both left the band. Matthew Klain was recruited to take over on bass, and the band decided they could make do with just one guitarist. In early 2002 the band released what would be their final album, Drunk with You on new Los Angeles indie label, Ecstatic. The album was recognized by the Boston Music Awards with a nominations for Local Album of the Year, and Local Song of the Year (for the song "Small").

== Discography ==
=== Singles and EPs ===
- "Beside" 7" single (1994, Bedazzled)
- Agus Amàrach (1994, Bedazzled)

=== Albums ===
- Silt (1995, Bedazzled)
- Super Refraction (1997, Egg)
- Drunk with You (2002, Ecstatic)

=== Compilation appearances ===
- Kindred Spirits CD (1994, Bedazzled) (song: "Whispers")
- Soon CD (1994, Castle von Buhler) (song: "Beyond Reach")
- Woke Up Smiling CD (1995, Bedazzled) (song: "She Is a Flower")
- Wicked Deluxe CD (1996, Wicked Disc) (song: "51 Pegasi: Rocket Song, V.1")
- Spring Fling CD (1996, Pulp Magazine) (song: "Flowereyed" (demo version))
- No Secrets CD (1998, Big Heavy World) (song: "51 Pegasi: Rocket Song, V.2")
- Notes from thee Real Underground Vol.1 3xCD, 2001, Underground, Inc./Invisible) (songs: "Heavy-Set John", "Jody Stone")
- Maximum Wage, A Bureau of Dissonant Culture Compilation CD (2001, Bureau of Dissonant Culture) (song: "Drowning For William")

== Noteworthy bands they've played with ==
Aerosmith, Black Rebel Motorcycle Club, The Boo Radleys, The Brian Jonestown Massacre, The Candy Butchers, Cranes, Cindytalk, David J, The Fixx, Garbage, Gigolo Aunts, Helium, Ivy, Love and Rockets, Love Spit Love, Lush, Mercury Rev, Morphine, My Own Worst Enemy, Amanda Palmer, The Push Stars, Rockets burst from the Streetlamps, Seven Mary Three, Slowdive, Sonic Youth, Splashdown, Spiritualized, The Strokes, Jen Trynin, Steve Wynn.
