= Time (Louis Cole album) =

Studio album by Louis Cole
- Released: August 10, 2018
- Genre: Funk
- Length: 45:14
- Label: Brainfeeder

Louis Cole chronology
Album 2 (2011)	Time (2018)	Live Sesh and Xtra Songs (2019)

Singles from Time
- 1. "Weird Part of the Night" Released: August 22, 2016; 2. "Things" Released: July 25, 2018

Time is the third studio album by American musician Louis Cole. It was released on August 10, 2018, on Brainfeeder.

== Background and release ==
Time was Louis Cole's first album released through Brainfeeder, and his first studio album since his 2011 release Album 2. He was signed to Brainfeeder by the label's founder Flying Lotus, another collaborator of Thundercat, who co-wrote and featured on Time track "Tunnels in the Air".

In an interview with Gigwise, Cole said his influences for the album ranged from the score of 2001: A Space Odyssey to soundtracks of video games such as Star Fox and Super Mario Kart. Cole wrote, recorded, and mixed the album himself in his Los Angeles garage over the course of two and a half years.

In 2016, Cole released a music video for the album's lead single "Weird Part of the Night" on YouTube. In the lead-up to the album's release in 2018, he also released music videos for "When You're Ugly", "Things", and "Phone".

In 2022, "Weird Part of the Night" was included on the soundtrack of the video game NBA 2K22.

== Critical reception ==
Professional ratings
Aggregate scores
Source	Rating
Metacritic	81/100
Review scores
Source	Rating
AllMusic	4/5 stars
The Line of Best Fit	6/10
Pitchfork	7.6/10
Uncut	8/10

Time was met with critical acclaim. At Metacritic, the album received an aggregate score of 81 based on 6 reviews, indicating "universal acclaim".

In a positive review for AllMusic, reviewer Andy Kellman called Time Louis Cole's "most refined batch of animated pop yet," praising the album's varied combination of "hyperactive and robust numbers" and "elegant, heartfelt material with an equal level of skill." Writing for Pitchfork, reviewer Philip Sherburne also praised the album, stating "Louis Cole's sidelong blend of hard funk and soft pop—aided by guest spots from Thundercat and Brad Mehldau—remains delightfully sly and off-kilter." In a review for the Los Angeles Times, staff writer Randall Roberts praised the "chops and wit" of the album, writing that its "14 tracks merge synthetic funk, hip-hop, indie soul and a love of life." In a mostly positive review for The Line of Best Fit, contributor Simon Edwards called Time "imperfect but refreshing," describing the album as "funny, funky, and unconcerned by looking like a bit-of-a-dick on the dancefloor."

== Track listing ==
No.	Title	Length
1.	"Weird Part of the Night"	4:20
2.	"When You're Ugly" (feat. Genevieve Artadi)	3:10
3.	"Everytime"	2:50
4.	"Phone"	2:50
5.	"Real Life" (feat. Brad Mehldau)	2:44
6.	"More Love Less Hate"	1:00
7.	"Tunnels in the Air" (feat. Thundercat)	3:24
8.	"Last Time You Went Away"	2:00
9.	"Freaky Times"	3:17
10.	"After the Load Is Blown"	3:03
11.	"A Little Bit More Time"	2:39
12.	"Trying Not to Die" (feat. Dennis Hamm)	4:02
13.	"Things"	4:48
14.	"Night"	5:07
Total length:		45:14
