= Genevieve Artadi =

American singer-songwriter and musician (born 1982)

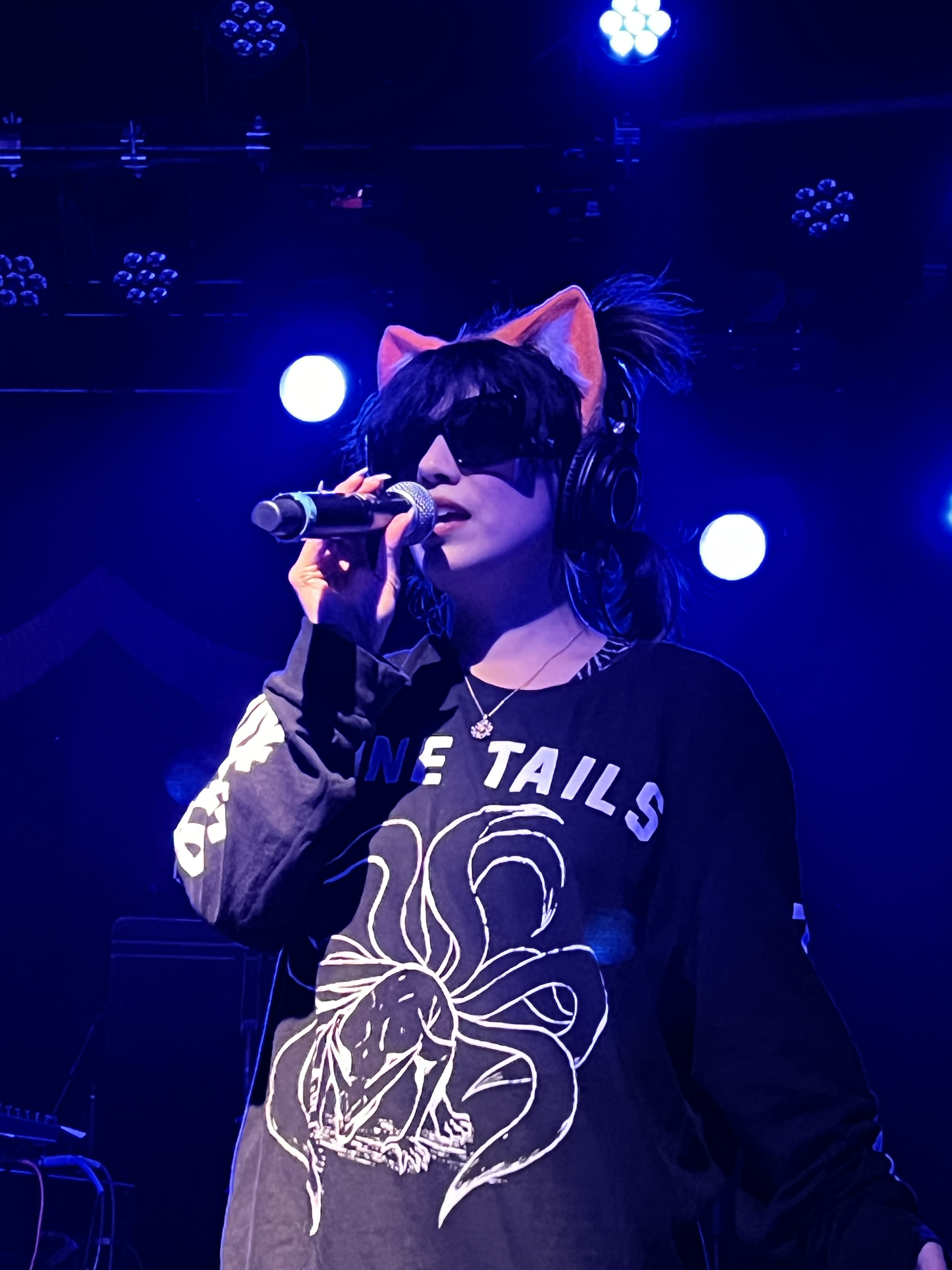
- Artadi in 2024

Background information
- Born: July 1, 1982 (age 44); Los Angeles, California, US
- Genres: Jazz; funk; pop; trip hop
- Occupations: Singer; songwriter; musician; video producer
- Instruments: Vocals; keyboard; bass
- Years active: 1998–present
- Label: Brainfeeder
- Member of: Knower
- Formerly of: Pollyn

Genevieve Veronica Artadi (born July 1, 1982) is an American singer-songwriter, musician, and video producer who is the lead vocalist of the independent electronic jazz-funk duo Knower. She was previously the lead vocalist of the electropop band Pollyn.

Artadi has released five albums with Knower beginning in 2010. She has released four solo studio albums and two collaborative albums, and has worked with artists such as Snarky Puppy and Thundercat.

== Early life ==
Artadi was born on July 1, 1982, in Los Angeles. Her parents, who had immigrated to the United States from the Philippines, were both musicians who toured in rock bands when Artadi was a child. As a result, Artadi had an unanchored childhood, moving every two or three years.

As a student, Artadi took classical piano lessons and Polynesian dance classes. Her first exposure to jazz came in seventh grade, when she listened to Natalie Cole's 1991 album Unforgettable... with Love. She attended California State University, Northridge, where she received a degree in jazz studies, before continuing her studies at California State University, Long Beach.

== Career ==
Artadi first performed as lead singer, bassist, and keyboardist of the indie electro-pop trio Pollyn, which formed in Los Angeles in 1998 and released their first EP in 2003. Her primary influences for the band included Portishead and Massive Attack.

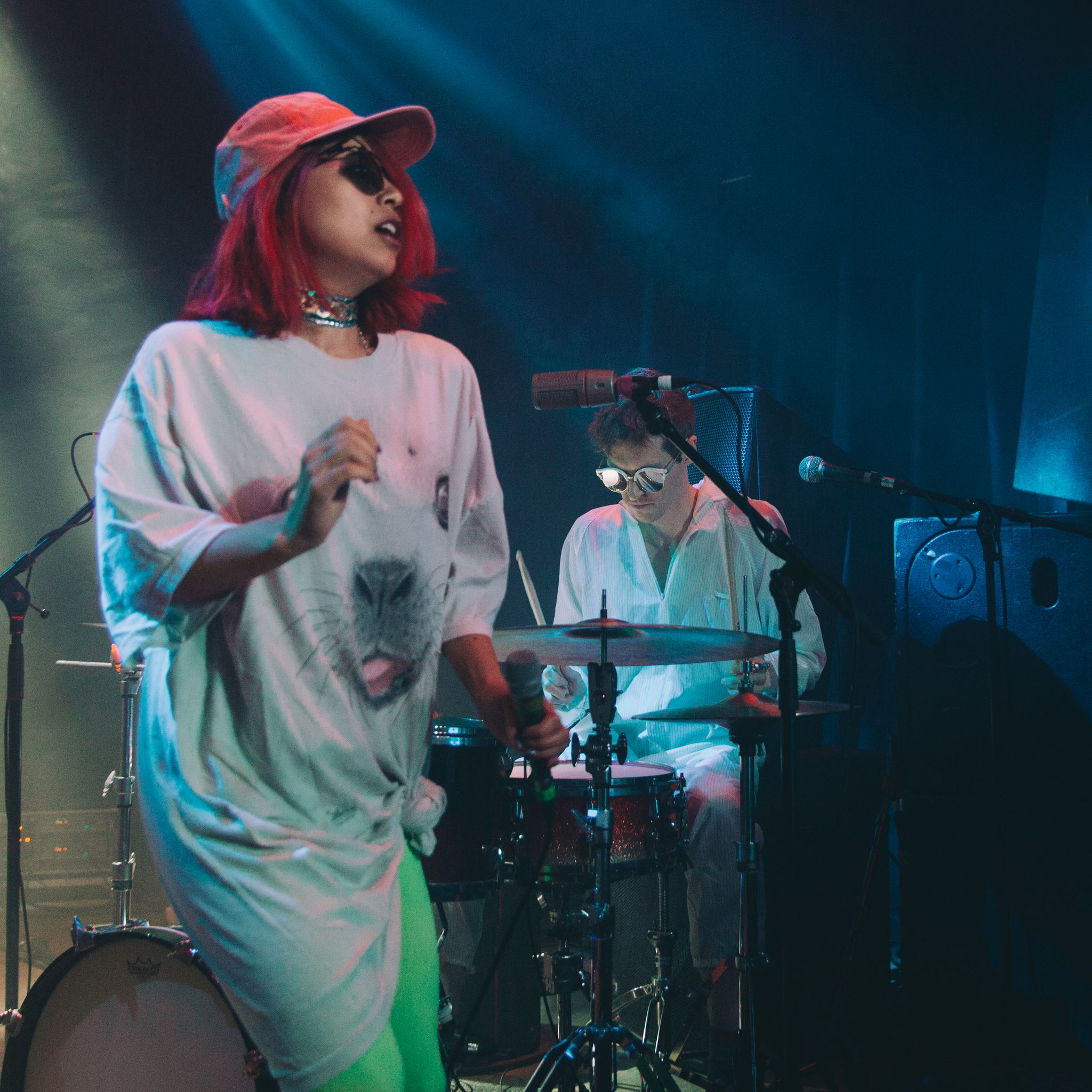
Artadi performing with Knower in 2018

In 2009, Artadi met multi-instrumentalist Louis Cole through saxophonist Robby Marshall. Artadi and Cole soon began making music together, forming the jazz-funk duo Knower. They began releasing covers of pop songs online before releasing their first album of original music as a duo, Louis Cole and Genevieve Artadi, in October 2010.

In 2015, Artadi self-released her debut solo album Genevieve Lalala, which she fully produced herself. The following year, Artadi and Cole performed on Snarky Puppy's live album Family Dinner – Volume 2, featuring on two songs as Knower. Artadi later featured on the song "When You're Ugly" on Cole's 2018 album Time.

Artadi's second solo album, Dizzy Strange Summer, which she completed in 2020, was originally planned to be self-released, but Louis Cole brought the album to Brainfeeder, who immediately signed Artadi and released the album under the label later that year. The album, which also features Cole on the track "Edge of the Cliff," was mostly recorded between 2016 and 2017, and features elements of jazz, pop, and trip hop.

In 2021, Artadi appeared on the fifth season soundtrack for the HBO series Insecure, featuring on the track "Satellite" with Cole and Thundercat.

In March 2023, Artadi released her third solo album Forever Forever, her second Brainfeeder release. The album was recorded at El Desierto Studio in Mexico and features Cole, guitarist Pedro Martins, keyboardist and vocalist Chiquita Magic, and pianist Chris Fishman. Artadi said the theme of the album is love, partially inspired by her on-and-off relationship with Martins at the time. Half of the album's tracks were originally written for big band, following Artadi's collaborations with the Norrbotten Big Band from Sweden. AllMusic's Paul Simpson awarded Forever Forever an Album Pick, praising it as "a kaleidoscopic, highly disciplined sound filled with knotty arrangements and detailed solos that always seem to fit naturally and logically within the songs." Pitchfork included the album on a 2023 "Great Records You May Have Missed" list, noting its "mathy full-band chops and psychedelic giddiness of the highest order."

Following Forever Forever, Artadi began working on her fourth solo album, which she said would be inspired by anime rock. In 2025, she announced a collaborative album with Norrbotten Big Band titled Another Leaf, which was released on April 7, 2025.

On October 30, 2026, Artadi released her fourth solo studio album, GVA!!!!!. The 15-track album was inspired by anime, with all music written and produced by Artadi and mastered by Louis Cole.

== Discography ==
=== Studio albums ===
Solo

Title	Album details
Genevieve Lalala	Released: March 6, 2015; Label: Self-released; Format: CD, digital download, streaming
Dizzy Strange Summer	Released: July 17, 2020; Label: Brainfeeder; Format: CD, digital download, streaming
Forever Forever	Released: March 17, 2023; Label: Brainfeeder; Format: CD, digital download, streaming
GVA!!!!!	Released: October 30, 2026; Label: Self-released; Format: Digital download, streaming

Collaborative

Title	Album details
Another Leaf (with Norrbotten Big Band)	Released: April 7, 2025; Label: Self-released; Format: CD, digital download, streaming
Everything Is Under Control (with Real Bad Man)	Released: October 3, 2025; Label: Self-released; Format: CD, digital download, streaming

With Knower

- Louis Cole and Genevieve Artadi (2010)
- Think Thoughts (2011)
- Let Go (2013)
- Life (2016)
- Knower Forever (2023)

With Pollyn

- Songs for Sale (2003)
- This Little Night (2009)
- Living in Patterns (2011)
- Distress Signals (2016)
