= Grant Collins =

- Origin: Australian
- Occupations: Performer, composer, teacher
- Instruments: Drums, percussion
- Website: www.grantcollins.com

Grant Collins is an Australian professional drummer and drum clinician.

== Early life and career ==
Grant Collins began playing drums in his late teens. He spent several years performing in a 90s cover band, before he returned to studying drums.

He toured the world with his One Man Percussion Orchestra, performing solo on a drum kit made up of 26 drums, 34 cymbals, and 18 foot pedals. In 1999 he released his debut album Primal Instinct recorded solo with no overdubs, with Modern Drummer writing "What sounds like three or four players is only him. But it’s not until you see Grant play live that you really comprehend what he does." Later, in 2006, Collins released a DVD of one of his performances, which Modern Drummer called "Collins' drumming skills are world-class...It's hard to imagine a human acoustic drumkit performer advancing much beyond this level." They noted he played on ""the largest drumkit in the Southern Hemisphere."

Collins has also performed as part of groups Topology, The Trevor Hart Quartet, and as The Collins/Wardingham Project with Paul Wardingham.

== Teaching ==
Outside of performing, Collins is known for his work as an educator.

He received his Doctorate of Musical Arts from the Queensland Conservatorium Griffith University in 2014.

== Discography ==
- Primal Instinct (1999)
- Dogboy (2001)
- Interactive, as The Collins/Wardingham Project (2007)

== Videography ==
- Live at the Tivoli – The Official Bootleg (2006)
- Live at the Powerhouse (2015)
