= Louis Cole =

American multi-instrumentalist

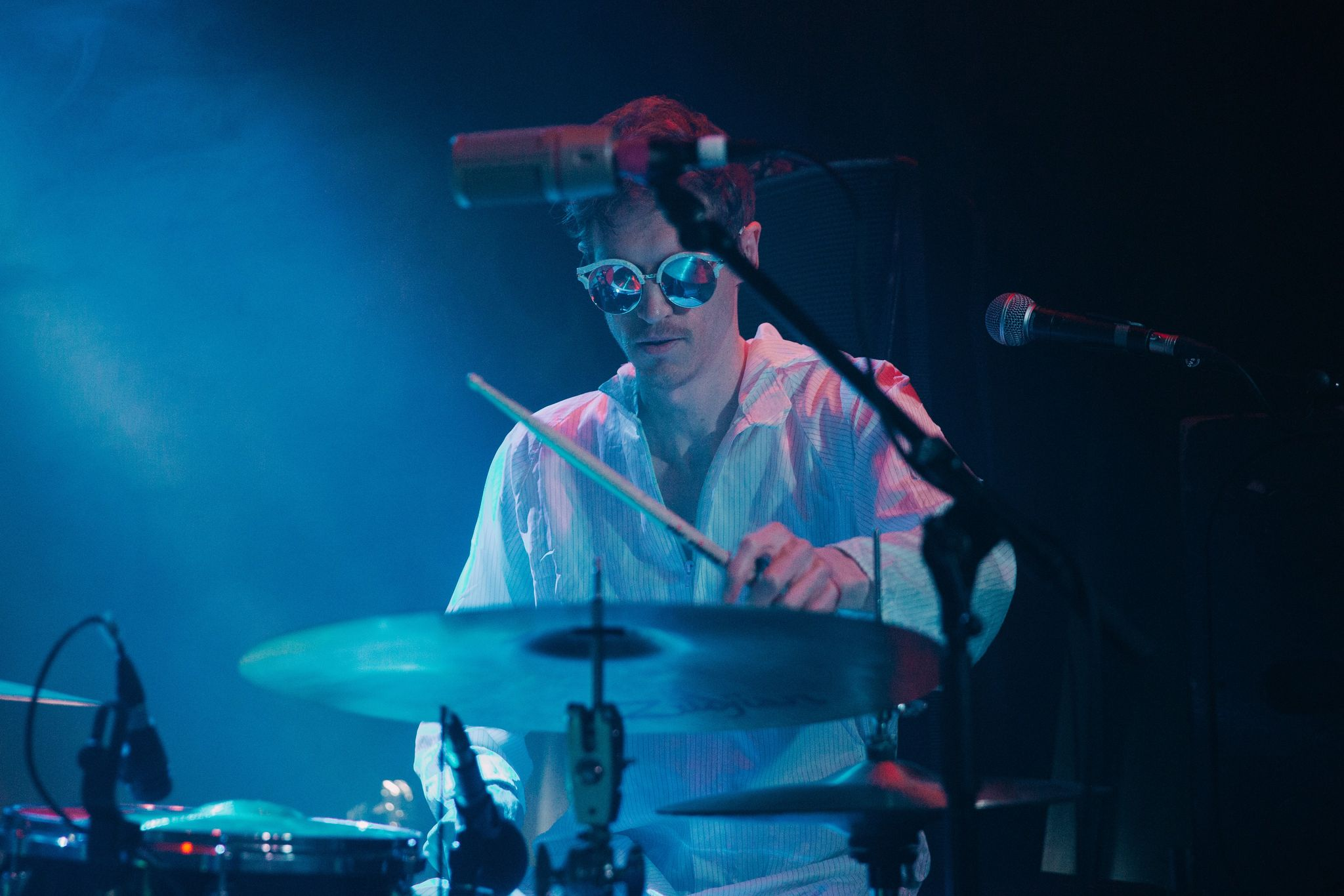
- Cole performing with Knower at The Haunt, Brighton, England, 2018

Background information
- Born: Louis Maxwell Cole; December 4, 1986 (age 39); Los Angeles, California, US
- Genres: Jazz; funk; avant-pop; electronic; indie; lo-fi
- Occupations: Musician; singer; songwriter; video producer
- Instruments: Bass; drums; guitar; keyboards; vocals
- Years active: 2008–present
- Labels: Brainfeeder; Ninja Tune
- Member of: Knower; Clown Core (speculated)

Louis Maxwell Cole (born December 4, 1986) is an American musician, singer-songwriter, and video producer who is the drummer, keyboardist, and bassist of the independent electronic jazz-funk duo Knower. He is speculated to be a member of the avant-garde musical duo Clown Core.

Cole has released five albums with Knower and four albums with Clown Core, beginning in 2010. As a solo artist, he self-released two albums before signing with Brainfeeder and releasing his third album, Time (2018). His fourth album, Quality Over Opinion (2022), was nominated for the Grammy Award for Best Alternative Jazz Album.

== Early life ==
Louis Cole was born in Los Angeles to a family with musical roots. His father plays jazz piano, while his mother played bass. Cole started drumming when he was 8. He graduated in jazz studies at the USC Thornton School of Music in 2009.

== Career ==
After graduating from USC in 2009, Cole was encouraged by his friend Jack Conte to put music videos on YouTube, including one called "Bank Account", which showcased a split-screen of him playing keyboards, drums, and singing. This video catapulted him into the public awareness, as it was posted on social media by various celebrities and musicians such as John Mayer, Charlie Day, and Björk.

After doing several other short songs and uploading them to YouTube, Cole wanted to focus more on writing longer material. He co-founded Knower with another jazz studies graduate, Genevieve Artadi. In 2010, he released both his self-titled solo album and the debut album for Knower. After releasing his second solo album, he focused more on Knower, producing three other albums. In the meantime, Cole co-wrote "Padded Cell" for Seal's 2015 album 7, and together with Artadi, got featured on Snarky Puppy's Family Dinner – Volume 2. In 2017, he co-wrote two songs for Thundercat's album Drunk. This led to signing a contract with Flying Lotus' label Brainfeeder and releasing his third solo album through the label in 2018. The album featured appearances by Artadi, Thundercat, Dennis Hamm and Brad Mehldau. Cole also appeared on Thundercat's 2020 Grammy Award winning album It Is What It Is, performing on a song called "I Love Louis Cole", which was dedicated to him.

In 2019, Cole's "Doing the Thing" was the 80th-best-performing single on the Tokio Hot 100. In 2020, Cole wrote an exclusive song for Grand Theft Auto Online called "Planet X", which was added to the FlyLo FM radio station through The Cayo Perico Heist update. Knower's song "Fuck the Makeup, Skip the Shower" was previously featured on the same radio station. "Planet X" was later included in Cole's fourth studio album Quality Over Opinion, which was released on October 14, 2022 via Brainfeeder. Another single from the album, "Let it Happen", was nominated for the Grammy Award for Best Arrangement, Instrumental and Vocals in 2023, and the album as a whole was nominated for Best Alternative Jazz Album the following year.

It is speculated that Cole and saxophonist Sam Gendel are behind Clown Core, a surrealist musical duo of two anonymous clowns who blend grindcore, jazz, and electronic music.

== Artistry ==
=== Style and writing ===
Cole is a classically trained jazz musician and multi-instrumentalist who plays drums, keyboards, guitar and bass, sings, and produces his material. His work contains elements from a diverse range of music genres such as jazz, funk, pop, avant-garde, electronic, lo-fi (early) and grindcore (with Clown Core). Cole is a "bedroom" musician who does not like working in a professional recording studio. He practices drums for four hours a day, and writes music for seven hours a day. Cole feels his mission is to write his own favorite music, and he "never [tries] to make [his] music accessible to anyone." He is known for using strange and counterintuitive chord progressions. His lyrics often include humor and vulgarity, and his music features home-made videos. Cole is more creative during the early hours of the day, and documents this phenomenon on his song, "The Weird Part of the Night".

=== Influences ===
Cole's influences include his father, Stevie Wonder, James Brown, Aretha Franklin, The Beach Boys, Boards of Canada, Nate Wood, The Beatles, and Skrillex, among others. Cole is also influenced by science fiction and video game sounds and visuals, and notes that the music of classic Nintendo games and Tron shaped Knower's aesthetic:

"That music really dug its way deep into my developing brain. There are a lot of imaginative chord changes, pretty melodies, heavy funk grooves, modulations, insane synth trumpet hits and really cool sounds in those games. I still, to this day, strive to include those kinds of things in my music."

— Louis Cole

Cole is best friends with Thundercat, who has called him "one of Los Angeles's greatest musicians". Flying Lotus has also expressed admiration for Cole on Twitter, calling him "super inspirational" during the writing of his album Flamagra.

== Reception ==
Bob Mintzer has described Cole as "the paradigm for today's musician". Will Schube of Passion of the Weiss has compared Cole's "auteur approach" to that of another Los Angeles musician, Ariel Pink. Emma Roller of The Brick House Cooperative has described Cole as "a dopey yet cerebral jazz composer and percussionist who whaps out brain-meltingly complex beats with Terminator-like precision".

== Discography ==
=== Studio albums ===
Solo albums

Title	Album details
Louis Cole	Released: February 10, 2010; Label: Self-released; Format: CD, digital download
Album 2	Released: March 22, 2011; Label: Self-released; Format: CD, digital download
Time	Released: August 10, 2018; Label: Brainfeeder; Format: CD, vinyl, digital download, streaming
Quality Over Opinion	Released: October 14, 2022; Label: Brainfeeder; Format: CD, vinyl, digital download, streaming
Some Unused Songs	Released: May 11, 2023; Label: Brainfeeder; Format: digital download, streaming
Nothing (with Metropole Orkest)	Released: August 9, 2024; Label: Brainfeeder; Format: CD, vinyl, digital download, streaming

With Knower

- Louis Cole and Genevieve Artadi (2010)
- Think Thoughts (2011)
- Let Go (2013)
- Life (2016)
- Knower Forever (2023)

With Clown Core

- Clown Core (2010)
- Toilet (2018)
- Van (2020)
- 1234 (2021)

=== Live albums ===
Title	Album details
LIVE 2019	Released: July 6, 2020; Label: Brainfeeder; Format: Digital download, streaming

=== Extended plays ===
Title	Details
Live Sesh and Xtra Songs	Released: April 5, 2019; Label: Brainfeeder; Format: Digital download, streaming

=== Singles ===
As lead artist

Title	Year	Album
"Weird Part of the Night"	2016	Time
"Bank Account"	2017	Non-album singles
"Thinking"	2017	Non-album singles
"Blimp"	2017	Non-album singles
"Things"	2018	Time
"Doing the Things"	2019	Non-album single
"Let It Happen"	2022	Quality Over Opinion
"I'm Tight"	2022	Quality Over Opinion
"Not Needed Anymore"	2022	Quality Over Opinion
"Dead Inside Shuffle"	2022	Quality Over Opinion
"Things Will Fall Apart"	2024	Nothing
"Life"	2024	Nothing
"These Dreams are Killing Me"	2024	Nothing
"nothing"	2024	Nothing

As featured artist

Title	Year	Album
"The Grid Generation" (Cory Wong featuring Louis Cole)	2023	The Lucky One

=== Production and songwriting ===
These are writing and production credits for music outside of Knower, Clown Core, or his own solo work.

Title	Year	Artist	Album	Notes
"Padded Cell"	2015	Seal	7	Co-writer
—N/a	2020	Jacob Mann	106	Mastered

=== Other appearances ===
Title	Year	Credited artist(s)	Album
"Bus in These Streets"	2016	Thundercat	Drunk
"Jameel's Space Ride"	2016	Thundercat	Drunk
—N/a	2018	Jacob Mann Big Band	Greatest Hits, Vol 2
"Tonight"	2018	Sam Wilkes	Wilkes
"Descending"	2018	Sam Wilkes	Wilkes
"It Gets Funkier IV"	2018	Vulfpeck (featuring Louis Cole)	Hill Climber
"Edge of the Cliff"	2020	Genevieve Artadi	Dizzy Strange Summer
"Hope Song"	2020	Genevieve Artadi	Dizzy Strange Summer
"Hits!"	2020	Henry Solomon and Logan Kane	
—N/a	2023	Genevieve Artadi	Forever Forever
"Mad Hope"	2023	Gen Hoshino	Lighthouse
"The End of Time"	2025	Darren Korb	Hades II Original Soundtrack
"—" denotes he wasn't on one song, but an entire album.
