= Opium Den (band) =

American gothic rock band

- Origin: Boston, Massachusetts, USA
- Genres: Gothic rock; ethereal wave; psychedelic rock; art rock
- Years active: 1992–1997
- Labels: Hereafter Records, Persephone Records
- Past members: Christian Gilbert; Mike Dema; Annette Farrington; John DeGregorio

Opium Den was an American 1990s gothic rock/ethereal wave band from Boston, Massachusetts, acclaimed for Christian Gilbert's Spanish/classical-influenced guitar playing and Annette Farrington's poetic lyrics. They also described their music as psychedelic rock and art rock.

The band released three albums: Diary of a Drunken Sun (1993), Secret Sky (1994) and the posthumous Clandestine (2005).

== History ==
Opium Den was formed in the early 1990s by guitarist Gilbert and drummer Mike Demma, who were looking for a singer for a psychedelic band they wanted to form. Farrington (then known as Annette Kramer), previously of the Lemmings, had been touring with a Boston theater company, and soon joined them on vocals. Farrington said, "I felt theater was a dinosaur. I wanted to create something that was creatively stimulating and cutting edge. I was auditioning guitar players. Christian and Mike saw my ad and we got together. It was instant synergy". The quartet was completed with the addition of John DeGregorio on bass, acoustic guitar and flute.

Farrington explained the genesis of the band's name: "The name invokes a multilayered meaning the social context and the literal meaning of an opium den. I wanted to invoke the state of where I thought the social consciousness lay. As a nation we are asleep in an Opium Den, asleep to consciousness and clarity. The drug being, materialism, greed, lack of connection to spirit. But we also wanted to invoke the transformative nature of being in a state of altered consciousness. We grew up in an apocalyptic society. There was so much fear, internal and outer. We felt a need to express the emotional struggle of finding a way to maintain a sense of purpose and hope in our lives".

Opium Den released their debut album, Diary of a Drunken Sun, in 1993 by Hereafter Records. A review in the October 1993 issue of The New Review of Records said, "Dramatic female vocals and chorus-tinged guitar arabesques magically recall Kaleidoscope-era Banshees, early Cocteau Twins and on the closing masterpiece 'The Wishing Tree', the haunting stillness of the Cure's Seventeen Seconds.

It was followed by Secret Sky in 1994, which AllMusic called a "compelling, brooding record".

Their third and final release, the six-song mini album Clandestine, was recorded in 1997, but remained unreleased until 2005.

== Other projects ==
Farrington later collaborated with producer Anthony J. Resta (Collective Soul, Shawn Mullins), releasing her debut solo album, Azure Wonder & Lust, in 2001 on Castle von Buhler Records.

In the late 1990s, DeGregorio (switching to guitar) formed Amber Spyglass with vocalist Kelly Godshall. They released their eponymous debut EP in 2001, followed by the album Accelerating Parcae (2004) and Breathing in Essence EP (2012), before they ended in 2013.

== Band members ==
Former members

- Christian Gilbert – guitar, recorder
- Mike Dema: drums, percussion
- Annette Farrington: vocals, guitar, recorder
- John DeGregorio: bass guitar, flute

== Discography ==
=== Studio albums ===
- Diary of a Drunken Sun (1993, Hereafter Records)
- Secret Sky (1994, Hereafter Records)
- Clandestine (2005, Persephone Records)

=== Compilation appearances ===
- "Dead Shall Rise" on Buy This Used Compact Disc (1993, Dutch East India Trading)
- "Blackwell Road" on Kindred Spirits (1994, Bedazzled Records)
- "Man on a Bicycle " on Soon (1994, Castle von Buhler Records)
- "Love Will Tear Us Apart" (Joy Division cover) on Ceremonial: A Tribute to Joy Division (1995, Mere Mortal Productions)
