= Knower =

American independent electronic music duo

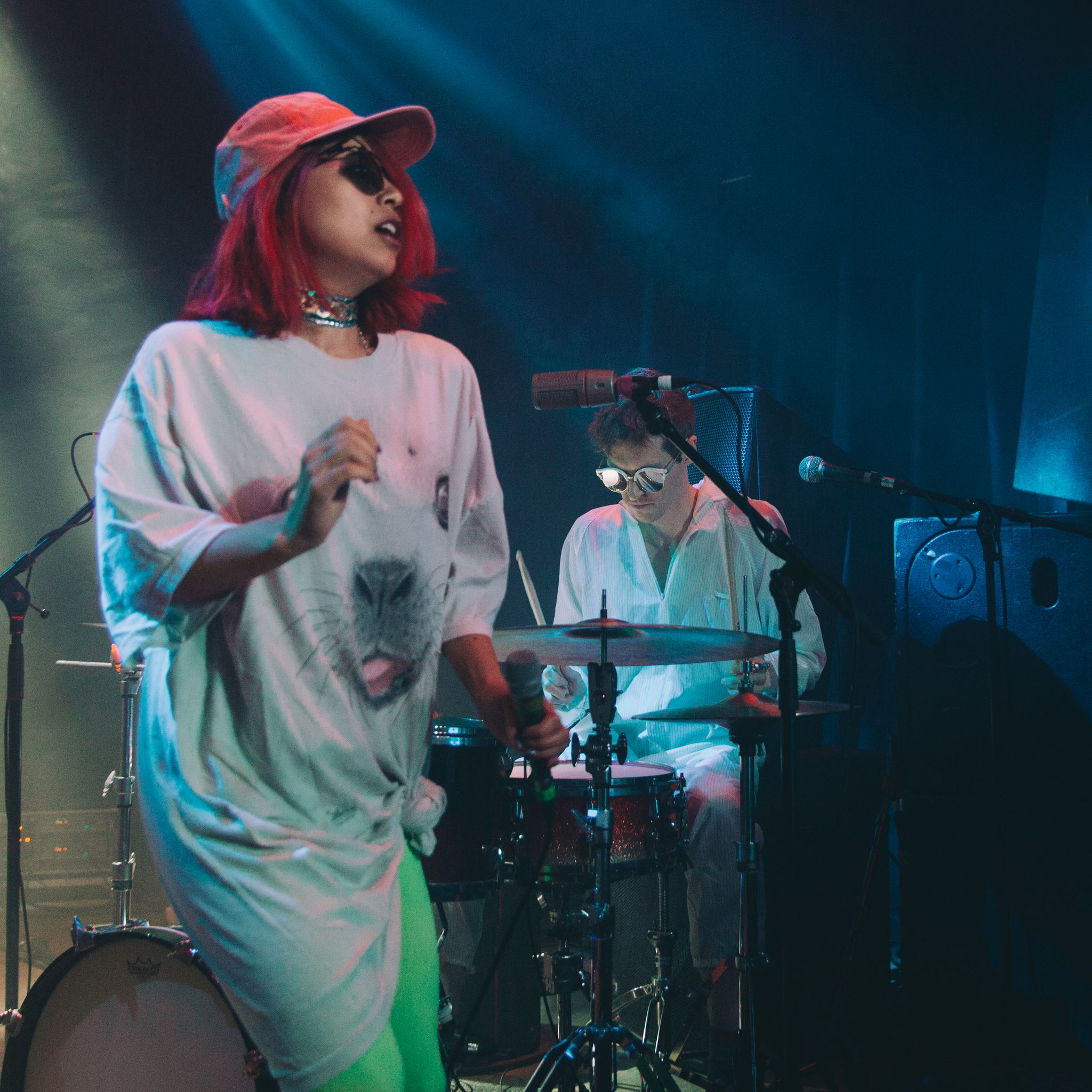
- Knower performing at The Haunt, Brighton, England, 2018

Background information
- Also known as: Louis Cole and Genevieve Artadi (2009-2013)
- Origin: Los Angeles, California, United States
- Genres: Indietronica, acid jazz, jazz-funk, avant-pop, dubstep
- Years active: 2009–present
- Members: Genevieve Artadi; Louis Cole

Knower, also stylized as KNOWER, is an American independent electronic jazz-funk duo. The group primarily consists of Louis Cole (bass, drums, guitars, keyboards, vocals) and Genevieve Artadi (bass, keyboards, vocals); their full band includes saxophone, bass and keyboard players. They have gained success releasing music online.

== History ==
=== Early years and formation ===
Louis Cole studied music in Los Angeles, California, graduating from the jazz studies program at USC Thornton in 2009. He became good friends with fellow musician Jack Conte in 2006. Both composed and recorded some songs, which are present on Conte's YouTube channel. Conte suggested Cole start releasing his music online. Genevieve Artadi also studied music in Los Angeles. She received her bachelor's degree in jazz studies at California State University (CSU) Northridge and did post-graduate studies at CSU Long Beach.

Cole and Artadi met through the LA-based saxophonist Robby Marshall. In 2009 Cole and Artadi joined forces.

=== Career ===
In early 2010, the group began to upload their music to YouTube. Their first video, a cover of Britney Spears's song "3" got a lot of hits quickly thanks to Jack Conte promoting it on YouTube. Another early video release, "Window Shop" (originally recorded on Louis Cole's first album) also got a lot of hits thanks to a front page YouTube feature. In this same year, they released their debut album, Louis Cole and Genevieve Artadi.

In 2011, their second album Think Thoughts was released. Songs such as "Around" and "I Remember" presented some heavy funk grooves. Soon after the release of this album, the group collaborated with Pomplamoose to release a single, "It Goes On." Sporting the group's distinctive electro-funk sound, the single brought increased visibility to the duo.

In early 2013, they changed the group's name to Knower. Let Go, Knower's third album, was released in April 2013. They followed the release of Let Go with a performance at Bonnaroo Festival with Soul Khan, Jenny Suk, and Black Violin. Knower also went on a tour of the east coast United States with duo WeYou, consisting of Nate Wood and Jesske Hume.

In 2014, Knower released the non-album single "I Must Be Dreaming", and toured the East Coast and the South. They were also presented by Quincy Jones in a new artist concert series in Los Angeles. Their song "Fuck the Makeup, Skip the Shower" was featured on FlyLo FM (hosted by Flying Lotus) on the next-gen version of Grand Theft Auto V.

In 2015, Knower recorded with Snarky Puppy on their Family Dinner – Volume 2.

In 2016 they released their fourth album, Life, and formed a 5-piece live band as an alternative lineup. Apart from the core members, the band at various points included Tim Lefebvre, Dennis Hamm, Sam Wilkes, Sam Gendel, Nate Wood and Jonah Nilsson. Their European tour of 2016, as well as parts of the US tour, featured the live band.

In July 2017, Knower opened for the Red Hot Chili Peppers in four major European cities, and since that year they have performed in many European cities with the Norrbotten Big Band of Sweden.

In 2018, Knower toured Europe, China, Japan, and the US, continuing the live band formation and also unveiling a renovated duo set with Artadi and Cole.

In 2019, Knower collaborated with Bob Mintzer and the WDR Big Band for a performance at JazzFest Bonn while also releasing videos of rehearsal sessions in studio in Cologne. They also expanded their touring that year, travelling to South Africa and South America, including Rapa Nui.

In 2020, during the COVID-19 pandemic, the pair released a "living room power set" onto their YouTube Channel, which included live performances of "Overtime", "Time Traveler", "Pizza", and "It's Time", among other songs.

Their fifth album, Knower Forever, was released exclusively on Bandcamp as a paid digital download and physical LP in June 2023, along with three free songs publicly available on YouTube; "I'm The President", "The Abyss" and "Crash The Car", to commercial success. Knower also included a choir, along with strings and brass sections on a lot of the songs on this album. The album was later released across other streaming platforms in October 2023.

== Members ==
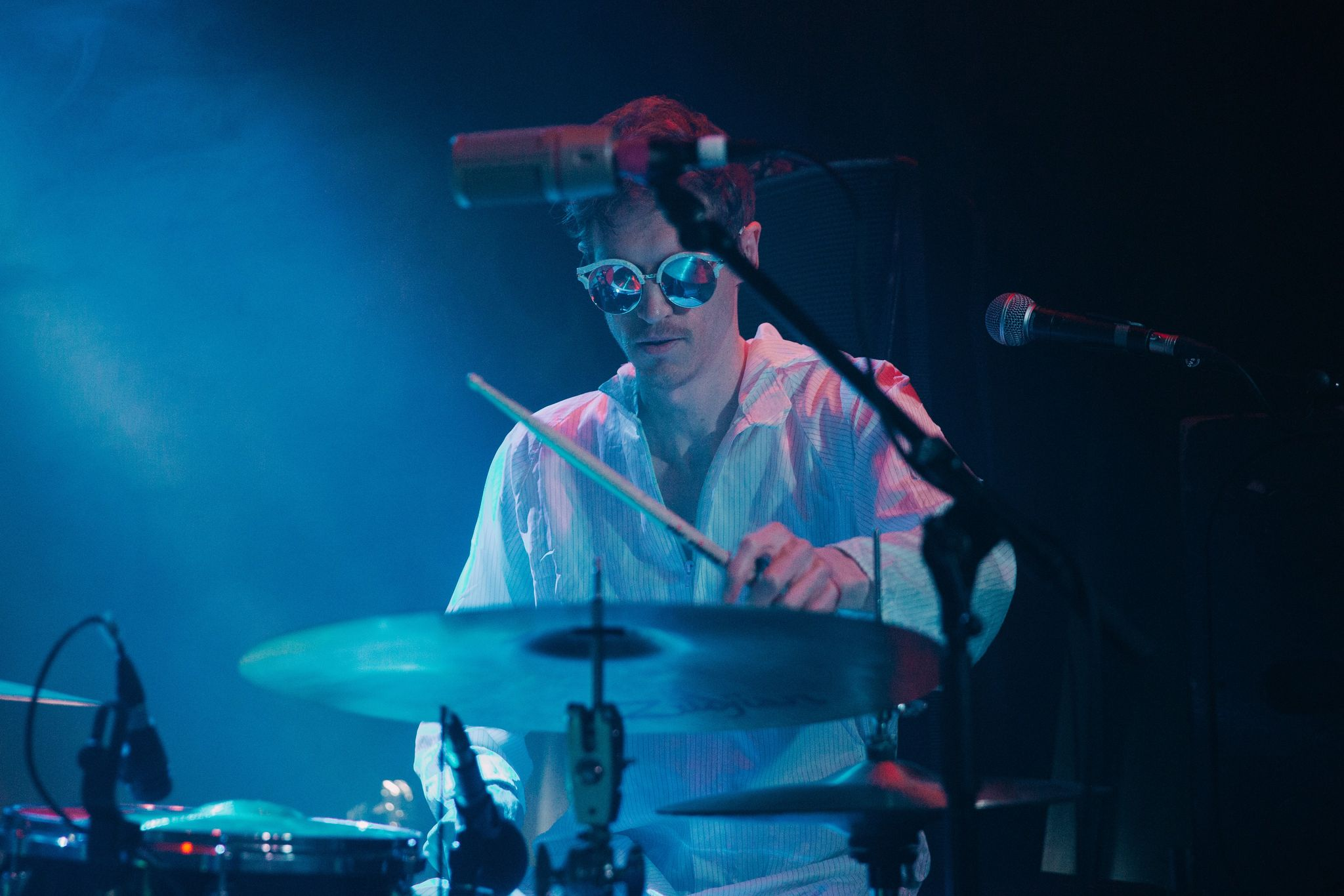
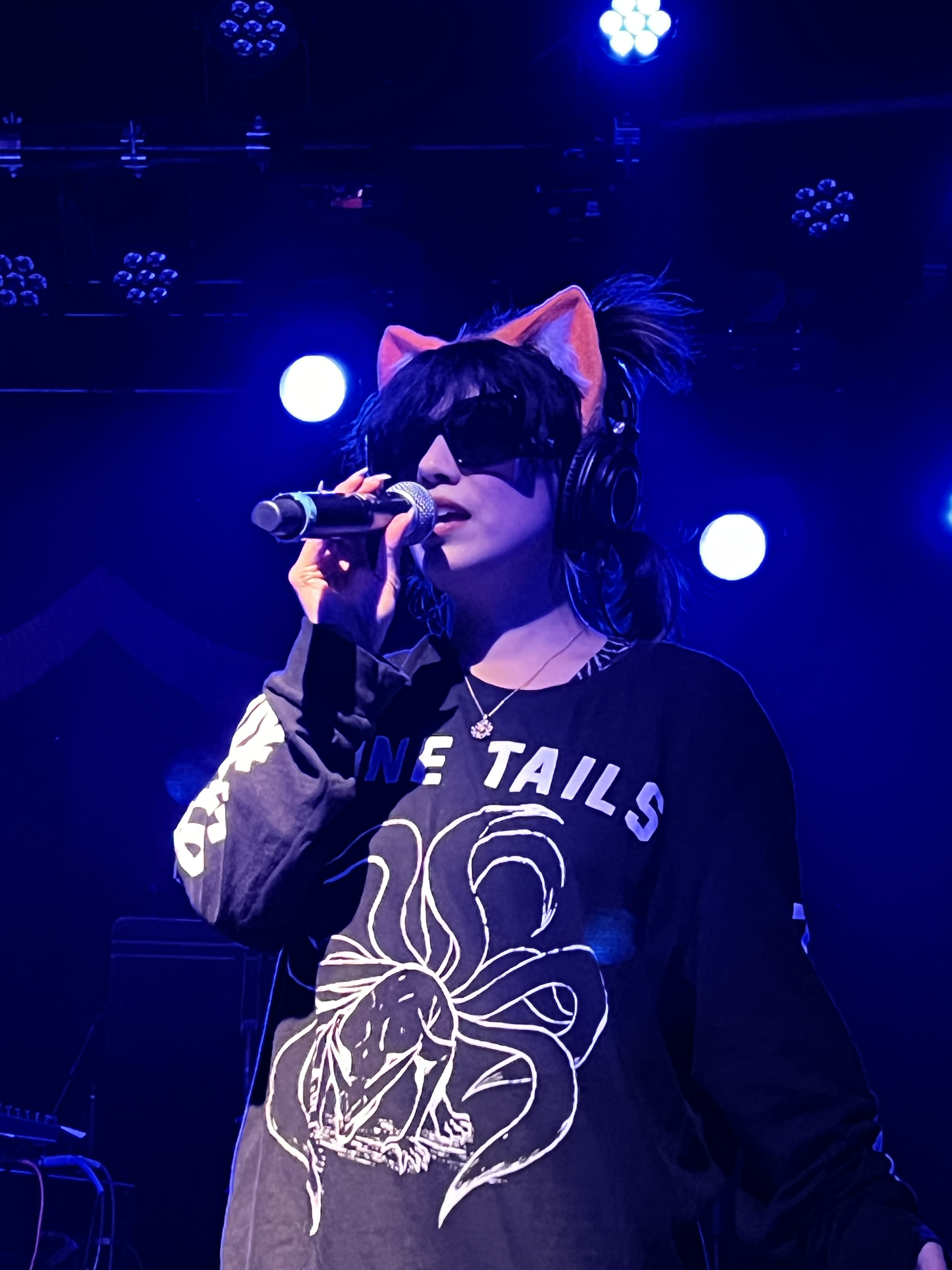
Core members Louis Cole (left) and Genevieve Artadi (right)

Core members

- Genevieve Artadi – vocals, keyboards, bass (2009–present)
- Louis Cole – drums, keyboards, guitar, bass, vocals (2009–present)

Additional and former additional members

- Adam Ratner – guitar
- Amber Navran – flute
- Aya Toyoshima – trombone
- Blaine McGurty – keyboards
- Chiquita Magic – keyboards, backing vocals
- Cory Wong – guitar
- Danielle Firouzi – piano
- David Binney – saxophone
- Dennis Hamm – keyboards
- Eldar Djangirov – keyboards
- Israel Strom – keyboards
- Jack Conte – keyboards, drums
- Jacob Mann – keyboards
- John Escreet – piano
- Jonah Nilsson – keyboards
- Jonathan Berroa – keyboards
- MonoNeon – bass
- Nataly Dawn – bass, vocals
- Nicholas Semrad – keyboards
- Rai Thistlethwayte – keyboards
- Paul Cornish – keyboards
- Pera Krstajic – bass
- Petter Olofsson – bass
- Sam Gendel – saxophone
- Sam Wilkes – bass
- Sammy Stephens – vocals
- Thom Gill – guitar, backing vocals
- Tim Lefebvre – bass
- Vikram Devasthali – rapping, trombone

== Discography ==
Knower discography
- Studio albums: 5
- EPs: 1
- Singles: 10
- Music videos: 44

=== Studio albums ===
Title	Details
Louis Cole and Genevieve Artadi	Released: October 1, 2010; Label: Self-released; Format: Digital download
Think Thoughts	Released: November 28, 2011; Label: Self-released; Format: Digital download
Let Go	Released: April 29, 2013; Label: Self-released; Format: Digital download
Life	Released: February 5, 2016; Label: Self-released; Format: CD, digital download
Knower Forever	Released: June 2, 2023; Label: Self-released; Format: CD, LP, digital download,

=== Extended plays ===
Title	Details
Some Thingies	Released: February 5, 2025; Label: Self-released; Format: Digital download, streaming

=== Singles ===
Title	Year	Album
"It Goes On" (featuring Pomplamoose)	2011	Non-album singles
"Burn"	2013	Non-album singles
"I Must Be Dreaming"	2014	Non-album singles
"Hanging On"	2015	Life
"Pizza"	2016	Life
"One Hope" (featuring David Binney)	2018	Non-album singles
"Different Lives"	2020	Non-album singles
"I'm The President"	2023	Knower Forever
"The Abyss"	2023	Knower Forever
"Crash The Car"	2023	Knower Forever

=== Music videos ===
Year	Title	Album
2010	"3"	—N/a
2010	"Baby"	—N/a
2010	"Window Shop"	Louis Cole and Genevieve Artadi
2010	"Cloudwalker"	—N/a
2010	"Like a Storm"	Louis Cole and Genevieve Artadi
2010	"The Mystery of a Burning Fire" (featuring Sam Gendel)	Louis Cole and Genevieve Artadi
2010	"All I Want"	Louis Cole and Genevieve Artadi
2010	"Trust the Light"	Louis Cole and Genevieve Artadi
2011	"It Goes On" (featuring Pomplamoose)	—N/a
2011	"Say What You Say"	Louis Cole and Genevieve Artadi
2011	"E.T."	—N/a
2011	"Before"	Let Go
2011	"Blow"	—N/a
2011	"Gotta be Another Way"	Think Thoughts
2011	"Around"	Think Thoughts
2011	"I Remember"	Think Thoughts
2011	"Promises"	—N/a
2012	"Paying the Price" (featuring Tim Lefebvre)	Think Thoughts
2012	"Things About You"	Think Thoughts
2012	"That's Where You Are"	Think Thoughts
2012	"Till the World Ends"	—N/a
2012	"Dreaming on Forever"	Let Go
2013	"What's In Your Heart"	Let Go
2013	"Stay"	—N/a
2013	"P.Y.T."	—N/a
2013	"Time Traveler"	Let Go
2013	"Get Lucky"	—N/a
2013	"Burn"	—N/a
2014	"Lady Gaga"	—N/a
2014	"I Must Be Dreaming"	—N/a
2014	"Fuck the Makeup, Skip the Shower"	Louis Cole and Genevieve Artadi
2015	"Hanging On"	Life
2016	"The Government Knows"	Life
2016	"Butts Tits Money"	Life
2016	"More Than Just Another Try"	Life
2017	"Overtime"	Life
2017	"Time Traveler"	Let Go
2020	"Different Lives"	—N/a
2023	"I'm The President"	Knower Forever
2023	"The Abyss"	Knower Forever
2023	"Crash The Car"	Knower Forever
2023	"Do Hot Girls Like Chords?"	Knower Forever
2023	"Real Nice Moment"	Knower Forever
2023	"It's All Nothing Until It's Everything"	Knower Forever
2024	"Same Smile, Different Face"	Knower Forever
