= Dom Famularo =

American drummer (1953–2023)

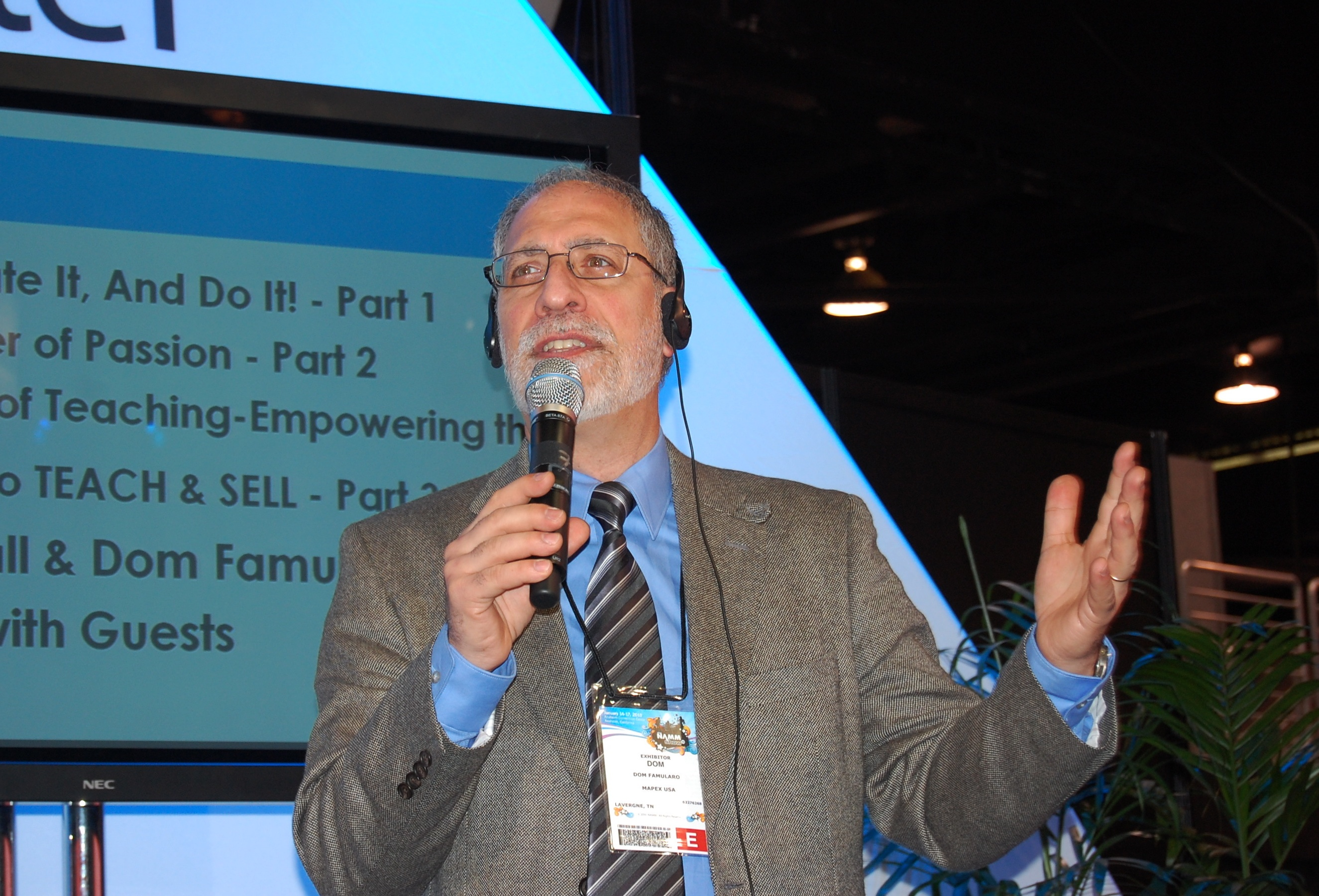
- Famularo in 2010

Background information
- Born: Dominick Salvatore Famularo; August 26, 1953; Long Island, New York, U.S.
- Died: September 27, 2023 (aged 70)
- Instrument: Drums
- Years active: 1966–2023
- Website: domfamularo.com

Dominick Salvatore "Dom" Famularo (August 26, 1953 – September 27, 2023) was an American drummer, drum teacher, author, clinician, and motivational speaker.

== Biography ==
Dominick Salvatore Famularo was born on Long Island, New York. He started playing the drums when he was 11 and became a professional at the age of 12. He began his career as a performing jazz drummer. He studied under some of the greatest drummers of the 20th century, including Jim Chapin and Joe Morello. With a passion for jazz and inspiring others, he began a successful drum teaching career, becoming one of the most sought-after clinicians of his time. Some of the most successful jazz and rock drummers had instruction from him.

Famularo was called "Drumming's Global Ambassador" due to the many places he visited and vast number of people that heard him speak each year. He was known for his open handed playing style and was the first Western drummer to perform clinics in China.

Famularo presented masterclasses and clinics around the globe in United States, Canada, Colombia, Mexico, Brazil, Chile, Argentina, Uruguay, Peru, England, Ireland, Scotland, France, Germany, Belgium, the Netherlands, Luxembourg, Austria, Switzerland, Portugal, Spain, Norway, Sweden, Poland, Serbia, Greece, Italy, Hungary, Costa Rica, Honduras, Puerto Rico, China, Hong Kong, Japan, Taiwan, Philippines, Malaysia, Indonesia, Singapore, Australia, New Zealand, Turkey, Israel, Canary Islands, South Africa, Ukraine, Latvia and Botswana.

Famularo directed and emceed major drumming expos around the world, and was one of drumming's most sought-after private instructors for over 40 years. He taught many of today's leading drummers, and students regularly flew in from around the globe for intensive study with him. He acted as education director and consultant for several leading drum companies.

Famularo used Mapex drums and Sabian cymbals. He shared the stage with many famous musicians—some include Steve Gadd, Terry Bozzio, B.B. King, Thomas Lang, Tommy Igoe, Will Calhoun and Chad Smith. He was also a motivational speaker and the author of "Cycle of Self-Empowerment."

Famularo was voted Best Clinician by the readers of Modern Drummer magazine in 2005 and 2006, and by the readers of DRUM! in 2006. He was the author of It's Your Move and The Cycle of Self-Empowerment, and co-author of The Weaker Side and Drumset Duets (with Stephane Chamberland), Open-Handed Playing (with Claus Hessler), Eighth-Note Rock and Beyond (with Glenn Ceglia), Pedal Control (with Joe Bergamini and Stephane Chamberland) and Groove Facility (with Rob Hirons).

On December 21, 2012, Famularo appeared on the national Fox TV show The Real Winning Edge. Famularo was involved in developing online teaching methods using websites, including Drumeo, and SABIAN Educators Network (SEN). He resided on Long Island with his wife and three sons.

Famularo created the first Wizdom Drumshed School in the world on Long Island (NY) many years ago ("Wizdom" being a mix of the words wizard and Dom). These schools took place across the globe in collaboration with Famularo; in Quebec City, Canada run by Stephane Chamberland, in Marseille, France run by Rob Hirons, in Paris run by Frederick Rimbert and in Italy run by Massimo Russo.

=== Death and legacy ===
Famularo died of pancreatic cancer on September 27, 2023, at the age of 70. Just three weeks before he passed, the Sabian Education Network (SEN), announced the newly created "Dom Famularo Mentorship Award". This is an annual award that is given to one winner, who will receive a $2,500 grant and personal mentorship from several industry professionals, including Sabian president Andy Zildjian, drummers David Garibaldi, Jim Toscano, Stephane Chamberland, and Sabian artist relations director Chris Stankee. The very first drummer to win this award was Ukrainian drummer Maksym Logosha.
