= The Curtain Society =

American rock band

- Origin: United States
- Genres: Alternative rock, shoegaze, dream pop
- Years active: 1988–present
- Labels: Orcaphat, Bedazzled
- Members: Roger Lavallee; Ron Mominee; Duncan Arsenault
- Past members: Jeff Paul

The Curtain Society is an American band which formed in Southbridge, Massachusetts in 1988, and consists of singer/guitarist Roger Lavallee, Ron Mominee and Duncan Arsenault. Their stylistic influences include pop, shoegazing, Dream pop and alternative rock & roll.

Their first releases were a series of EPs and cassettes through Apostrophe Records, a label directed by Lavallee. In 1993 the band signed with Washington, DC–based label Bedazzled Records. Their first release with Bedazzled was the limited-edition 7" record "Chelsea", backed with "All Over You". Inertia, the band's first full-length record, appeared in 1995. The band then appeared on various compilations, including the series of art/music compilations from Boston's Castle von Buhler, before releasing their second album, Life Is Long, Still, in 1996. New songs were featured on the four song EP titled Volume, Tone, Tempo in 1999, which was also Bedazzled's final release before ceasing operations in 2000.

In 2005, the full length CD Every Corner of the Room was released on Orcaphat Records. The album was featured on multiple episodes of the soap operas One Life to Live and The Young and the Restless, on The Rachel Zoe Project on Bravo and in the movie Still Green.

Together with Scott Ricciuti (Huck, Childhood, Pistol Whipped), the band has also performed as a backing band for Jim Carroll (as "The Catholic Boys"), and for Shana Morrison. The Curtain Society has also performed with Mark Burgess from The Chameleons.

They celebrated their 30th anniversary with a performance in their hometown of Worcester Massachusetts in December 2018. The show was recorded with the intention of a future release.

== Discography ==
=== Albums ===
- Where Are You?, Apostrophe Records, 1992 (cassette)
- Inertia, Bedazzled Records, 1995 (CD)
- Life is Long, Still, Bedazzled Records, 1996 (CD)
- 10th Anniversary Celebration, 1998 (4 song CD)
- Volume, Tone, Tempo, Bedazzled Records, 2000 (EP)
- Every Corner of the Room, Orcaphat Records, 2005 (CD)

=== Singles and compilations ===
- "Birds Fly Information", Boston Does Boston Vol 1&2, 2013
- "Sleigh Ride", A Very Local Christmas 2003, Bedazzled Records, 1997
- "No Wonder", It's Your Local Music, 2002
- "Plaster", Several Bands Galore, Claire Records, 1998
- "Swing/Evanston", Splashed with Many a Speck, Dewdrops Records, 1997
- "Riverful", Losing Today Magazine, 1997
- "Mouthwithout (version 2)", Nigh, Castle von Buhler Records, 1997
- "Mouthwithout", Bedazzled Records, 1997 (7" vinyl) (backed with "Swamp Thing," a cover of The Chameleons)
- "Ferris Wheel", Radio Hepcats Vol. 1, Antarctic Press, 1996
- "Gravity", Anon, Castle von Buhler Records, 1995
- "Cradle", Woke Up Smiling, Bedazzled Records, 1995
- "Love Ends", Soon, Castle von Buhler Records, 1994
- "Adrenaline", Kindred Spirits, Bedazzled Records, 1994
- "Chelsea", Bedazzled Records, 1993 (backed with "All Over You 7")

== See also ==
- Shoegazing
- List of shoegazing musicians
- Dream pop
- Alternative rock
