= Bedazzled Records =

- Founded: 1989
- Country of origin: United States
- Location: Washington, D.C.

Bedazzled Records was an American record label, based in Washington, D.C., which existed from 1989 to 2000. It primarily featured ethereal wave, goth rock, dream pop and shoegaze bands. The label was known for its intricate packaging/graphic design.

Bands that recorded for the label include Strange Boutique, Siddal, An April March, Ultracherry Violet, The Curtain Society, Mistle Thrush, The Freed Unit, and Halou.

The name of the label was taken from the movie of the same name (starring Peter Cook and Dudley Moore), and started by the members of Strange Boutique.

== See also ==
- Lists of record labels
