= Lost in Space (2018 TV series) =

American science fiction television series

- Series logotype
- Genre: Science fiction; Adventure; Family drama
- Created by: Irwin Allen
- Based on: Lost in Space by Irwin Allen; The Swiss Family Robinson by Johann David Wyss
- Developed by: Matt Sazama; Burk Sharpless
- Showrunner: Zack Estrin
- Starring: Molly Parker; Toby Stephens; Maxwell Jenkins; Taylor Russell; Mina Sundwall; Ignacio Serricchio; Parker Posey; Brian Steele; Ajay Friese; Sibongile Mlambo
- Theme music composer: John Williams
- Composer: Christopher Lennertz
- Country of origin: United States
- Original language: English
- No. of seasons: 3
- No. of episodes: 28

Production
- Executive producers: Neil Marshall; Zack Estrin; Kevin Burns; Jon Jashni; Matt Sazama; Burk Sharpless; Marc Helwig; Alex Graves; Brad Van Arragon; Jabbar Raisani
- Producers: Brad Van Arragon; Kari Drake; Katherine Collins; Scott Schofield
- Production locations: Vancouver, British Columbia
- Cinematography: Sam McCurdy
- Running time: 39–65 minutes
- Production companies: Sazama Sharpless Productions; Applebox Entertainment; Synthesis Entertainment; Clickety-Clack Productions; Legendary Television

Original release
- Network: Netflix
- Release: April 13, 2018 – December 1, 2021

Related
- Lost in Space (1965 TV series); Lost in Space (1998 film)

Lost in Space is an American science fiction television series following the adventures of a family of space colonists whose ship veers off course. The series is a reimagining of the 1965 series of the same name, inspired by the 1812 novel The Swiss Family Robinson and the 1962 Gold Key comic book Space Family Robinson, created by Del Connell and artist Dan Spiegle.

Produced by Legendary Television, Synthesis Entertainment, Clickety-Clack Productions, and Applebox Entertainment, the show is written by Matt Sazama and Burk Sharpless, with Zack Estrin serving as showrunner. Netflix released the series on April 13, 2018, renewing it the following month for a second season. The second season premiered on December 24, 2019. The third and final season was released on December 1, 2021.

== Premise ==
In 2046, two years after an impact event that threatens the survival of humanity, the Robinson family is selected for the 24th mission of the Resolute (24th Colonist Group), an interstellar spacecraft carrying selected families and civilians to colonize the Alpha Centauri planetary system.

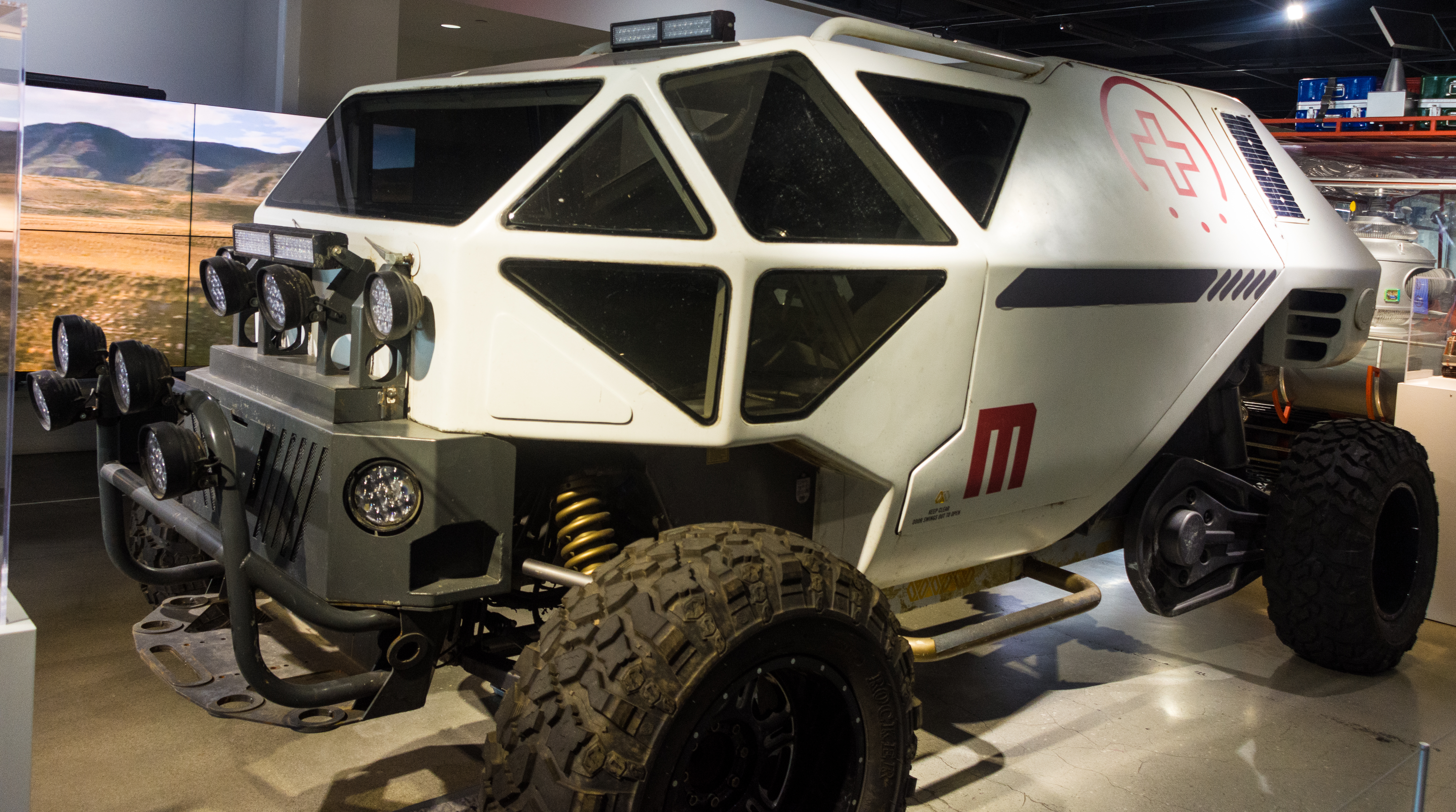
Each Jupiter spacecraft carries one of these Chariots for surface transportation on a planetary body.

Before they reach their destination, an alien robot breaches the Resolute's hull. Forced to evacuate the mothership in numerous short-range Jupiter spacecraft, scores of colonists, among them the Robinsons, crash on a nearby habitable planet. There they must contend with a strange environment and battle their own personal demons as they search for a way back to the Resolute.

== Cast ==
=== Main ===
- Molly Parker as Maureen Robinson, an aerospace engineer who serves as the mission commander for the Jupiter 2, taking her family on the mission to colonize Alpha Centauri in hopes of building a new life on a better world. Married to John Robinson, she is Judy, Penny, and Will Robinson's mother.
- Toby Stephens as John Robinson, former U.S. Navy SEAL and husband to Maureen. He is Penny and Will's father and Judy's stepfather.
- Maxwell Jenkins as Will Robinson, Maureen and John's prodigious youngest child, who forms a tight bond with an alien robot who he saves from destruction during a forest fire.
- Taylor Russell as Judy Robinson, Maureen's eldest child and John's stepdaughter, who serves as mission doctor, having received accelerated medical training to earn her medical license at age 18.
- Mina Sundwall as Penny Robinson, Maureen and John's younger daughter and middle child, a rebellious teenage girl who becomes inspired to write about her experiences.
- Ignacio Serricchio as Don West, a ship mechanic and smuggler of luxury goods. He is accompanied by his lucky chicken, Debbie.
- Parker Posey as June Harris / Zoe Smith, a petty criminal who assumes the identity of her sister, Jessica, to take her place on the Resolute. The name of her character, June Harris, is also a nod to June Lockhart, who played Maureen Robinson in the original series, and Jonathan Harris, who played Smith in the original series.
- Brian Steele as the Robot (seasons 2–3; recurring season 1), an alien robot being that Will encounters after the crash. The robot has a different form from the ones that appeared in the previous series and film.
- Ajay Friese as Vijay Dhar (season 2; recurring seasons 1, 3), Victor's son and Penny's love interest.
- Sibongile Mlambo as Angela Goddard (season 2; recurring season 1), an engineer and fellow survivor struggling with post traumatic stress disorder in the wake of her husband's death during the attack on the Resolute. Her character is named for Angela Cartwright, who played Penny Robinson in the original television series, and Mark Goddard, who played Don West in the original series.

=== Recurring ===
- Raza Jaffrey as Victor Dhar, the representative of the 24th colony group and father to Vijay
- Cary-Hiroyuki Tagawa as Hiroki Watanabe (season 1), a biologist and friend of Maureen's
- Yukari Komatsu as Naoko Watanabe (seasons 1–2; guest season 3), Hiroki's daughter, who is considered the best pilot among the colonists
- Kiki Sukezane as Aiko Watanabe (season 1), Hiroki's granddaughter
- Veenu Sandhu as Prisha Dhar (season 1; guest seasons 2–3), Victor's wife
- Adam Greydon Reid as Peter Beckert (season 1; guest season 3), a survivor of the Resolute and Victor's associate
- Amelia Burstyn as Diane Radoo, the communications officer on the Resolute
- Iain Belcher as Evan (season 1), an electrician and survivor on the unknown planet
- Shaun Parkes as I. Radic (seasons 1–2; guest season 3), a captain and the commander in charge of security operations on the Resolute
- Rowan Schlosberg as Connor (season 1; guest seasons 2–3), a survivor of the Resolute on the unknown planet
- Viv Leacock as Reese (seasons 1, 3; guest season 2), a survivor of the Resolute. He has several children, including Noah
- Douglas Hodge as Alistair Hastings (season 2; guest season 3), an intelligence officer on the Resolute who wants to get the ship to Alpha Centauri at all costs, including stranding hundreds of colonists on an alien planet
- JJ Feild as Ben Adler (season 2; guest season 3), head of the Advanced Technology unit on the Resolute. He seeks to understand the robots and their technology. He was married to Amanda and had two sons.
- Sakina Jaffrey as Captain Kamal (season 2), who becomes commander of the Resolute following the incapacitation of Captain Radic
- Tattiawna Jones as Ava (seasons 2–3), the head mechanic on the Resolute and Don's superior
- Aria DeMaris as Izabel Azevedo (seasons 2–3), a physicist, and passenger on the Resolute. She is married to Aubrey and is one of Elise's mothers.
- Zya Acala as Elise Azevedo (season 2; guest season 3), the daughter of Izabel and Aubrey
- Nevis Unipan as Samantha (seasons 2–3), a little girl who was left on the Resolute following the evacuation. She befriends the Robinsons.
- Amanda Marier as Samantha's mom (season 2)
- Russell Hornsby as Grant Kelly (season 3), Judy's biological father and the commander of the ill-fated Fortuna mission
- Charles Vandervaart as Liam Tufeld (season 3), Penny's new love interest
- Elias Leacock as Noah (season 3), a child who was stranded in the Jupiter transporter

=== Guest ===
- AnnaMaria Demara as Tam Roughneck (season 1), a mechanic and friend of Don West's
- Selma Blair as Jessica Harris (seasons 1–2), June's wealthy younger sister
- Bill Mumy as Zachary Smith (seasons 1–2), the real Dr. Smith whose identity June steals. As a child, Mumy portrayed Will Robinson in the original Lost in Space series from 1965 to 1968.
- Angela Cartwright as Sheila Harris (season 2), June's mother. As a child, Cartwright portrayed Penny Robinson in the original Lost in Space series from 1965 to 1968.
- Alison Araya as Aubrey Azevedo (seasons 2–3), a physicist and passenger on the Resolute. She is married to Izabel and is one of Elise's mothers.
- Rob LaBelle as Mr. Jackson (seasons 2–3), the school teacher aboard the Resolute
- June Lockhart as June (season 3), a radio communications officer on Alpha Centauri (credited as "the Voice of Alpha Control", the name June is denoted by subtitles). June Lockhart portrayed Maureen Robinson in the original television series.
- Karen LeBlanc as the chancellor of the Alpha Centauri base (season 3)

== Episodes ==
Season	Episodes	Originally released
1	10	April 13, 2018
2	10	December 24, 2019
3	8	December 1, 2021

=== Season 1 (2018) ===
No. overall	No. in season	Title	Directed by	Written by	Original release date
1	1	"Impact"	Neil Marshall	Matt Sazama & Burk Sharpless	April 13, 2018
Facing global catastrophe, humans are leaving Earth for a colony in the Alpha Centauri system. Their main colony ship, the Resolute, is attacked by aliens, forcing the colonists to escape in their smaller Jupiter spacecraft, but they are hurled into a wormhole and crash-land on an Earth-like planet. The Robinson family's ship, the Jupiter 2, crashes into a glacial bed. They evacuate as their ship sinks in rapidly freezing water. The eldest child Judy, a teenaged doctor, becomes trapped in the ice while diving to the sunken ship for equipment. Her father, John, and her brother, Will, set out to melt the ice before Judy's oxygen runs out. While trapped, Judy guides her younger sister, Penny, through a medical procedure to treat their injured mother, Maureen. Will falls into a chasm, landing near a forest where he finds a crashed alien ship and a dismembered robot that he helps to repair itself. In return, it saves Will from a forest fire. Will and the robot return to the Robinsons' ship, and the robot melts the ice, rescuing Judy. Twelve hours earlier, a woman is shown stealing Dr. Zachary Smith's identity and boarding an escaping Jupiter craft along with Don West, a Resolute crew member and occasional smuggler, and another co-worker, Tam Roughneck.
2	2	"Diamonds in the Sky"	Neil Marshall	Matt Sazama & Burk Sharpless	April 13, 2018
Don West and Smith survive the Jupiter 18 crash landing. Searching for other survivors, they find seriously injured Angela Goddard. Don and Angela take cover during a storm while Smith heads out, promising to get help. Meanwhile, the robot melts more ice to allow the Jupiter 2 to be recovered. Penny and Judy continue raising the sunken ship while Maureen, John, Will, and the robot hike to another Jupiter crash site they have spotted. They also inspect the robot's wrecked ship. Inside, a holographic map shows they are stranded in an unidentified galaxy. Outside, the robot touches the ship's hull, creating a mental connection to Will who "sees" what actually happened aboard the Resolute: the attacker was his robot. When Penny detects a storm approaching, she dangerously accelerates raising the Jupiter 2 against sister Judy's warnings to access the ship's Chariot all-terrain vehicle. She rescues the family ahead of the storm. While heading back to the Jupiter 2 they find Smith, who claims to be alone.
3	3	"Infestation"	Tim Southam	Zack Estrin	April 13, 2018
In a flashback, Dr. Smith is revealed to be June Harris, the older, ex-con sister of Jessica Harris, a successful businesswoman. Jessica offers June her entire estate as she is leaving Earth, but June drugs Jessica and assumes her identity. Aboard the Resolute, she bumps into Jessica's lover, who discovers her fraudulence. In an ensuing altercation, he is blown out of an airlock. June is arrested but escapes during the robot's attack. In the present, the refreezing ice layer over the Jupiter 2 cracks, endangering the ship. While rushing to complete repairs, the group discovers large eel-like creatures in the conduits consuming fuel. The glacier shifts, forcing an emergency take-off after the eels are flushed from the engines. There is enough fuel to take off and land near a forest. Comms pick up radio communication from other survivors and also from the Resolute, which is searching for survivors. Somebody hacks the onboard 3D printer to make a gun. Will finds it, and hides the weapon under his mattress, unaware that Smith is watching.
4	4	"The Robinsons Were Here"	Alice Troughton	Katherine Collins	April 13, 2018
Without fuel, the family initiates the Jupiter 2's colonization protocol. Smith and Will discuss the robot, who does Will's bidding. Don West and Angela are rescued by the Watanabe family; Hiroki Watanabe reunites with John and Maureen at the Jupiter 11 where Judy treats Angela. Angela tells Judy about the Resolute attack. The fuel-consuming eels prevent the other Jupiters from taking off. Meanwhile, Maureen, John, and Don take a Chariot to scavenge the remains of a piece of the Resolute that had crashed on the planet. They discover the Resolute's communication dish on the planet and realize that that they are unable to contact the Resolute. John and Maureen become trapped under the dish and discuss their marital issues. Meanwhile, Judy confronts Will about the robot attack on the Resolute. They hide the robot in a nearby cave, unaware that Smith has followed them. On their way, they run into Vijay Dhar, son of Victor Dhar, a colonist leader. The next morning, the children return to Jupiter 2 before their parents and tell them that the robot wandered away. Inside the cave, Smith attempts to instill distrust in the robot about Will.
5	5	"Transmission"	Deborah Chow	Kari Drake	April 13, 2018
The colonists build a light tower to signal the Resolute. Meanwhile, Maureen, noticing strange weather phenomena, discovers that the sun is in a binary system with a black hole, resulting in orbital changes that will soon render the planet uninhabitable. Meanwhile, Penny develops a crush on Vijay. When Don confronts Dr. Smith about a stolen flare gun, she claims she took it by mistake. In a flashback, Maureen and the children discuss the pros and cons of going to Alpha Centauri. Don tells Judy about his suspicions regarding Dr. Smith's identity. When Judy confronts Dr. Smith, she lies and casts doubt on Don. When the colonists activate the light signal, Dr. Smith, knowing she will be arrested back aboard the Resolute, shuts down the perimeter fence. When large reptilian creatures enter the camp and destroy the light tower, endangering the colonists, Will summons the robot for help. Initially, following Will's orders to remain peaceful, the robot does not defend itself. Not wanting the robot to be harmed, Will orders it to fight back. When it assumes its original multi-limb form, the colonists recognize it as the robot from the Resolute attack.
6	6	"Eulogy"	Vincenzo Natali	Ed McCardie	April 13, 2018
Penny overhears Maureen telling John about the black hole. In a heated discussion, John convinces the other survivors to allow the robot to stay. He then takes Will on a hike to discuss his responsibility for the robot's actions and has Will build a stone memorial to the 27 casualties of the robot attack. Don, along with Victor Dhar, Judy, and other colonists, set out to retrieve the fuel from Don's Jupiter, which crashed in the desert where there are no eel-like creatures. After arriving, the colonists discover that the Jupiter is sitting dangerously at the edge of a cliff, but manage to retrieve all the fuel anyway. While inside the crashed ship, Don retrieves the real Dr. Smith's ID, later showing Judy. Maureen learns that Hiroki also knows the planet is dying. Penny tells Vijay about the black hole but swears him to secrecy, and they share a kiss. Dr. Smith manipulates the distraught Angela to shoot the robot, sending it into attack mode where it accidentally injures John. Distraught, Will orders the robot to walk off a cliff, then places another stone on the memorial.
7	7	"Pressurized"	Tim Southam	Vivian Lee	April 13, 2018
While Judy and Don are driving back to Jupiter 2, Maureen tries to find out who printed the gun. Will confirms that the robot 3D-printed the gun, and that he hid it, but Maureen discovers that it is no longer under his bed. Smith deflects blame for Angela's attack by suggesting that Victor Dhar might have taken the gun. En route to another Jupiter, John and Maureen's chariot rover gets stuck in a tar pit. Before escaping, Maureen admits she falsified Will's qualification test results, while John apologizes for leaving Maureen and their kids to return to duty. Meanwhile, Smith locates the destroyed robot, but is unable to get it to reassemble itself. While Don's group speeds through a geyser field with the recovered fuel, the tanker flips, and colonist Evan becomes trapped underneath. Moving the tanker to save Evan will cause most of the fuel to be lost. Don moves the tanker, losing fuel, but Evan dies on the way back. Back on Jupiter 2, Dr. Smith finds the alien signal, which reactivates the robot. When Victor returns home, Vijay informs him about the planet's coming demise. Victor decides to use the fuel they retrieved to launch his Jupiter 4.
8	8	"Trajectory"	Stephen Surjik	Katherine Collins & Kari Drake	April 13, 2018
When Maureen can't talk the Dhars out of launching, John sneaks aboard their Jupiter 4 and triggers the emergency shutdown. Later, the gathered colonists are told the planet is becoming uninhabitable; Penny breaks up with Vijay after she learns he told his father about the black hole. Maureen devises a launch plan by remotely piloting the Jupiters, similar to the Apollo program, with John and Don as pilots. Judy informs Maureen about the real Dr. Smith, so Maureen confines the fake Smith in the Jupiter, who claims to really be physicist Jessica Harris. Meanwhile, the Resolute signals they must leave orbit within 24 hours due to the approaching black hole. This news forces John and Don to launch in the Jupiter 4 ahead of schedule in the evening. Smith deceives Will with a promise to save his dad and escapes, knocking out Maureen while she is giving flight instructions. Without instructions, the ship explodes in mid-air as Judy, Penny, and the rest of the colonists watch.
9	9	"Resurrection"	Tim Southam	Story by : Daniel McLellan; Teleplay by : Kari Drake	April 13, 2018
Will tries signaling his father using his radio. Dr. Smith drives a captive Maureen to the alien wreck. She claims she did not know that Maureen was guiding the ship launch. Dr. Smith promises to help Maureen get her children off the planet in exchange for Maureen helping her with the alien ship. Will discovers that the cave rocks he collected are dried biomass which can be used to fuel the Jupiter ships to reach the Resolute. While colonists harvest the biomass, Judy searches for Maureen. The colonists gather enough biomass to power all the Jupiters but they must remove it quietly to avoid waking the dangerous winged predators roosting in the cave. Will detects a signal he believes is from John. Periodic flashbacks reveal the Christmas Star was not a meteor but an alien craft. Its engine was used to build Resolute. The robot's attack was an attempt to retrieve the stolen engine. The group narrowly escape the cave after awakening the creatures. Judy tracks down Smith and Maureen. She disables Dr. Smith, but the robot reactivates and now obeys the Doctor's commands.
10	10	"Danger, Will Robinson"	David Nutter	Matt Sazama & Burk Sharpless	April 13, 2018
Having survived the explosion, John and Don cling to the ship's wreckage in orbit, with only hours of air left. The Robot, now under Smith's control, rejects Will's attempt to re-bond, but Smith allows Maureen's rescue attempt of John in the Jupiter 2. Victor hails the Robinsons, saying all colonists on the Resolute must leave in one hour to avoid the black hole. Maureen traps Dr. Smith and the robot, but they escape shortly thereafter. After Maureen lures the robot into the cargo bay and knocks him into space, a second alien robot (SAR) arrives to retrieve its engine. As SAR is about to kill Will, his Robot remembers their friendship and saves Will, hurtling both itself and SAR into space. Will goes outside to manually close the damaged open hatch, but loses his grip. He is saved by John, who was rescued by Smith shooting a harpoon. With all Robinsons safely aboard the Jupiter 2, Maureen confines Dr. Smith, grateful but still distrusting of her. Before they can dock with the Resolute, the alien engine activates and catapults Jupiter 2 to a different solar system. Will recognizes the system from the Robot's sand drawing as "Danger".

=== Season 2 (2019) ===
No. overall	No. in season	Title	Directed by	Written by	Original release date
11	1	"Shipwrecked"	Alex Graves	Matt Sazama & Burk Sharpless	December 24, 2019
Seven months later, on an oceanic planet with a lethal methane-rich atmosphere, the Jupiter 2 crew survive on a narrow land spit. While stranded there, Maureen studies the alien engine. Celebrating Christmas, Will prints Penny's book, "Lost in Space", for each family member. When a breach in the make-shift hothouse destroys the food crop, the family decides to somehow leave the planet. To recharge the ship's battery, they erect tall sails on the Jupiter's hull to navigate the ship toward a potential electrical storm. Mid-voyage, they hit a reef while attempting to outrun a monsoon, during which John is injured. Maureen is forced to release the imprisoned Dr. Smith who, claiming she can sail, successfully helms the Jupiter through a narrow reef passage. Smith later hints that she deliberately breached the hothouse to destroy the crops, knowing Maureen wanted to leave the planet while John was content staying there. Continuing their voyage, they encounter a deep waterfall that is actually a massive metal trench traversing the ocean and has the same properties as the Robot.
12	2	"Precipice"	Alex Graves	Zack Estrin	December 24, 2019
With Jupiter 2 perched on the trench's edge, the crew siphon the atmosphere for fuel and use a lightning strike to recharge the ship. Invasive toxic kelp renders the Jupiter immobile. A strand pricks Don's leg, causing anaphylactic shock which Judy treats with a transfusion using Smith's blood. Huge waves of the waterfall sweep Penny and Maureen off the hull and into the trench. While trapped, Penny laments being "average" compared to her siblings, though Maureen disagrees. John lowers the chariot into the trench but the tether falls short. Penny devises a make-shift ladder that reaches the chariot. As lightning powers the ship into space, the SAR's (the Second Alien Robot) severed arm inside the Jupiter reanimates from the power surge. Maureen notices a momentary engine spike on the ship's monitor during the lightning strike. The Resolute's electromagnetic signature is detected and a course is plotted for it. Smith secretly hides some of the toxic kelp inside one of the copies of Penny's book.
13	3	"Echoes"	Leslie Hope	Liz Sagal	December 24, 2019
Jupiter 2 reaches the Resolute which has been evacuated and left on reserve power. They find that the last log entry was seven months earlier. Smith sneaks aboard the Resolute and creates a diversion that closes off various deck sections, trapping Maureen and John, and, separately, Penny and Will, who are cut off from Judy. Smith then accesses the Resolute's database and deletes incriminating evidence against her and assumes Dr. Zachary Smith's identity, becoming "Zoe" Smith, a therapist, while leaving the real Dr. Smith in a medical stasis compartment. Judy encounters Samantha, a young girl left behind on the Resolute; Will and Penny hide in the dining hall as a damaged robot crawls through the halls. Observing from the Jupiter 2 cockpit, Don, still recovering, helps the Robinsons navigate the Resolute. John and Maureen trap the robot in the engine room. Judy and Samantha encounter Smith, who realizes Samantha's father was the man she blew out of the airlock earlier in the mission. Judy learns that SAR and Will's Robot caused the evacuation, with Will's Robot helping people escape. Another Jupiter arrives with Mission leader Ben Adler. He says the damaged robot, called Scarecrow, was forced to pilot the Resolute on all missions.
14	4	"Scarecrow"	Jon East	Kari Drake	December 24, 2019
John and Maureen meet Hastings, the Resolute's secret director of piloting Scarecrow. Ben explains that during SAR's attack, it took the alien engine with it. Maureen offers the alien engine aboard Jupiter 2. Don, John, and Judy go to the planet below to help the colonists find water. A parasitic spore that destroys metal causes the drilling rig over a deep well to collapse, trapping John below. As Commander Radic interrogates Smith, she infects him with the toxic kelp, putting him in a coma. With Radic incapacitated and a falsified identity, Smith now has a "clean slate." Penny knows Smith's true identity, but must prove it. Will tries bonding with Scarecrow, giving it SAR's detached arm to repair itself. Distrusting any human, it attempts to attack him. Adler reveals to Maureen that the Resolute was built around the alien ship's engine after it crashed on Earth, an event mischaracterized as the Christmas Star meteor; only a robot can operate the engine. After touching the damaged engine, Will sees through his connection to the robot that it is alive on the planet.
15	5	"Run"	Jon East	Vivian Lee	December 24, 2019
John is injured while attempting to climb out of the well. Judy, miles away at base camp, takes medical supplies and goes in a rover to treat him. When the metal-eating parasite causes the vehicle to break down en route, Judy leaves the protected corridor and runs through dangerous open terrain to reach John. When it is discovered that human contact is spreading the metal infection, all traffic to the Resolute is halted to contain it. Maureen and Adler escort Will to the planet to find the Robot. On the Resolute, Penny remains intent on exposing Smith's fraud and criminality after suspecting she infected Radic. Penny is reunited with Vijay and convinces him to help her investigate Smith, though they find nothing. When they encounter Smith in the corridor, Smith tells Penny it does not matter what someone knows, only what can be proved. Penny notices the metallic infection eating through the corridor deck.
16	6	"Severed"	Tim Southam	Katherine Collins	December 24, 2019
Penny, Vijay, Smith, and Mr. Jackson are quarantined in the ship's infected area. Rescue crews are unable to reach them and the captain has ordered the contaminated section to be severed from the Resolute. Don orders Penny, Vijay, Smith, and Jackson to get into an air-tight, portable storage unit that Don will attempt to retrieve with a Jupiter after it is blasted into space. Penny persuades Smith to mind-game the claustrophobic Jackson into compliance. Don successfully retrieves the container but is arrested after his smuggling activities are exposed. Maureen, Will, and Ben search for the Robot on the planet's surface. It arrives to save them from a pack of predators. Leading them to a cave, it attempts communication, but Will quickly realizes that it is actually the SAR. It lured Will to the planet's surface, using the Robot as bait. With the façade exposed, SAR indicates it wants something but before that is revealed, Adler kills SAR using a weapon. Maureen later confronts Adler about the weapon's lethality. Will falls down a fissure where he finds the true Robot.
17	7	"Evolution"	Tim Southam	Daniel McLellan	December 24, 2019
While discussing the water decontamination process with John, Captain Kamal suddenly seems alarmed by an audio transmission and ends their conversation. The transmission reveals that numerous alien ships are converging on the Resolute. With Don in lockup, John is forced to ask for Smith's help. Smith apparently contacts security, who arrest John. She then joins Hastings' inner circle; both John and Smith later reveal that they were working together to obtain information. Smith has learned that once Maureen and Will return with the Robot, the Resolute, having a limited water supply, will depart for Alpha Centauri with only those currently on board, stranding the remaining colonists on the planet. Adler intends to use the Robot to pilot the alien engine the same as Scarecrow, which was chained and tortured into compliance. Adler observes the Robot's emotional empathy for living things. After the Robot removes the alien engine from Jupiter 2, John updates Maureen about Hastings' true intent. Maureen notices a nearby ammonium-rich gas giant that can shorten the water decontamination to a few days. The Robinsons and their allies plot a mutiny to rescue the stranded colonists.
18	8	"Unknown"	Jabbar Raisani	Kari Drake & Katherine Collins	December 24, 2019
Maureen navigates the Resolute into the gas giant's atmosphere to collect ammonium. As the mutiny is launched, Hastings tells John about Maureen having given him her access codes in exchange for Will being accepted into the Jupiter program. If Maureen refuses to surrender the bridge, Hastings threatens to open an airlock where crew are working. John sends Smith to warn Maureen, but Smith detours to avoid confronting Samantha and her mother, taking her longer to reach the bridge and arriving too late to gain access. Hastings opens the airlock, trapping Ava and Don, who are barely surviving using air masks. Maureen saves them by closing the airlock from the outside in a service pod. The mutiny fails, but Captain Kamal trusts Maureen's calculations and utilizes her plan over Hastings' objections. Meanwhile, Penny tells Will that Robot appears changed, which seems proven when it ignores Will's pleas to help the trapped workers and instead frees Scarecrow. John berates Smith for betraying them and disbelieves her assertion that she genuinely tried warning Maureen. Robot refuses Will's request to take the Resolute to Alpha Centauri, determined to save Scarecrow.
19	9	"Shell Game"	Stephen Surjik	Zack Estrin & Vivian Lee	December 24, 2019
To protect himself, Hastings attempts to murder John and Maureen by locking them out of the ship while they are outside in separate service pods. Will agrees to help Robot save the dying Scarecrow, which is the reason it refused to take them to Alpha Centauri, by returning it to the planet, assisted by Judy and Penny. Meanwhile, Smith aids Hastings in foiling their attempt. By playing a shell game, the Robinson children deceive the authorities, and Will is able to get Scarecrow to Jupiter 2, only to be stopped by Adler. Will convinces a remorseful Adler to help transport Scarecrow to the planet, but Robot is captured to pilot the Resolute. As Will and Adler travel to the planet, Hastings hooks Robot up to the alien engine and the torture device.
20	10	"Ninety-Seven"	Alex Graves	Matt Sazama & Burk Sharpless	December 24, 2019
Maureen and John, having barely survived Hastings' murder attempt, secretly make it back aboard. Don and the Robinson children keep them hidden. Adler sacrifices himself to save Scarecrow; Maureen, John, and Don seize control of the Resolute when Hastings tries leaving orbit without the stranded colonists. Robots board the Resolute, with more incoming to retrieve the alien engine. Maureen and Don trap the robots, while Judy captains a mission to send the Resolute's ninety-seven children to the Alpha Centauri colony in a Jupiter using the alien engine, piloted by Robot. Unable to travel through the rift, the Resolute crew scatter in the other Jupiters. Smith and Scarecrow both apparently sacrifice themselves battling the invading robots, giving Judy, Will, Penny, and the children time to escape. Maureen and John stay behind to destroy the Resolute and the robots' ship. Don rescues them in Jupiter 2 before the ship explodes. The Jupiter, carrying the children, escapes through the rift. However, the human-made radar signature that Robot followed, assuming it would lead to the colony, has led the ship to an unknown star system. There they see the Fortuna, a ship that vanished nearly twenty years earlier and was commanded by Grant Kelly, Judy's biological father.

=== Season 3 (2021) ===
No. overall	No. in season	Title	Directed by	Written by	Original release date
21	1	"Three Little Birds"	Frederick E.O. Toye	Matt Sazama & Burk Sharpless	December 1, 2021
Judy boards the orbiting Fortuna and discovers most of the crew were transported in-stasis to a nearby planet via a lander. An asteroid damages the Jupiter, causing the autopilot to direct it to the surface; Judy barely makes it back to the Jupiter and is saved by Dr. Smith, who stowed away. Almost a year later, the Resolute children and Smith remain stranded on the planet, which is continually bombarded by meteors. They work to collect enough titanium to repair the Jupiter's engine. Meanwhile, large asteroids surrounding the planet constantly collide and break into many smaller ones, leaving a shrinking timeframe in which to safely launch the ship. Light years away, the Resolute crew attempt to repair their Jupiter ships, scavenging parts from the Resolute's wreckage while evading the robots. To reach Alpha Centauri, they need to obtain an alien engine and a robot to operate it. Meanwhile, Robot has been discarding the collected titanium to prevent the Jupiter from taking off to protect Will, who the robots are hunting. Once the children can reach Alpha Centauri, Will secretly intends to leave with Robot to save his family. Robot finds a deserted alien city while Judy searches for the Fortuna's lander. Penny has distanced herself from Will and Judy.
22	2	"Contact"	Kevin Rodney Sullivan	Zack Estrin	December 1, 2021
In a tunnel, Robot shows Will, Penny, and Smith the technology belonging to the extinct race that created the robots. Needing a robot to operate an alien engine, John, Maureen, and Don return to the planet where SAR's remains are. They instead find a fully functional Scarecrow inside their Jupiter who was initially hostile towards them before Robot and Scarecrow communicate remotely, allowing John and Maureen to talk to Will and Penny. Knowing that the alien race is now extinct, Will deduces that the robots' original programming is obsolete and wants them reprogramed for a new purpose. Meanwhile, Judy locates the Fortuna lander and revives the in-stasis Grant Kelly; she reveals that he is her biological father. They transport the other in-stasis crew to the Jupiter, leaving them in their pods to conserve oxygen during the flight to Alpha Centauri. In a remote location, robots are restoring SAR.
23	3	"The New Guy"	Sarah Boyd	Vivian Lee	December 1, 2021
Will returns to explore the cave where he discovers the aliens' skeletal remains, which shows they resembled the robots. He also finds a control panel and records audio commands. To conserve oxygen during the voyage, it is decided that Smith should be placed in stasis before the Jupiter launches. Will bargains with Smith, promising to release her from stasis upon reaching Alpha Centauri in return for her helping him and Robot leave the planet to protect his family. Grant disables the Jupiter's autopilot, overriding its safety protocols that will prevent the ship launching into the asteroid field. He successfully navigates through the debris, helped by Judy, who reboots the autopilot mid-takeoff. Meanwhile, Scarecrow helps John, Maureen, and Don attempt to retrieve an alien engine from a robot ship. However, it is soon found out to be a trap, and a revived SAR captures Scarecrow.
24	4	"Nothing Left Behind"	Julian Holmes	Daniel McLellan	December 1, 2021
With SAR's forces on an attack run, the Resolute crew destroy any data revealing Alpha Centauri's location, then await their fate. SAR uses Scarecrow to remotely connect with Robot to notify the children that their parents are in danger, luring them into a trap. SAR then kills Scarecrow. The children agree to risk their lives to rescue their families. Their Jupiter is put on autopilot and sent ahead as a decoy while the children, Grant, and Smith follow behind on the Fortuna. With Robot and the alien engine they have on board, a rift can be opened for all Jupiters to escape through. As the colonists prepare to depart, Will returns to the Fortuna with Robot, hoping to use the signals he recorded in the alien cave to stop SAR, though it fails. The Robinsons are the last to go through the rift, but SAR follows before it closes. To prevent SAR from reaching Alpha Centauri, John has Robot divert their course while the other Jupiters safely arrive at Alpha Centauri. Jupiter 2 and the Fortuna are sent on a collision course with another planet. With the Jupiter left powerless, John orders everyone to eject before it crashes.
25	5	"Stuck"	Leslie Hope	Kari Drake	December 1, 2021
Everyone safely ejects from the Jupiter 2 except Maureen and Judy, whose ejector seats malfunction. The Jupiter crash lands. They are safe, but Maureen's armed ejector seat will explode if she attempts to stand. John and Penny find Robot trapped in the crashed Fortuna and work to free him. Meanwhile, a gigantic slug-like creature is slowly swallowing the Jupiter. SAR and the other robots search for Jupiter survivors. Will attempts to retrieve his backpack from a tree. The backpack contains an alien skull he collected from the cave. The Fortuna's power supply spontaneously reboots. Before John can disable it to remain undetected by the robots, Penny sees unusual footage on a monitor, but it shuts off before she fully views it. John takes the hard drive to watch it later. Judy devises a way to free the Jupiter from the creature and save Maureen. Once freed, Robot leaves to search for Will. Don encounters a robot that scans his body before knocking him unconscious. Don recovers and returns to the Jupiter. The robot that scanned Don shows SAR what it recorded.
26	6	"Final Transmission"	Julian Holmes	Katherine Collins	December 1, 2021
Maureen and John watch the Fortuna video footage: five years earlier, a robot entered the Fortuna lander and scanned the in-stasis Grant Kelly. When Don recounts also being scanned, Maureen realizes it detects minute chemical changes within a person's body showing where in the universe they have been. They realize that Grant was scanned to find at what point within the universe the Earth is located, while Don was scanned because he has been to Alpha Centauri. Will leaves secretly to meet with SAR alone. He shows SAR the alien skull and asks if he understands what programming is and if he feels sad that the creators are dead. SAR says it understands programming and reveals the robots killed the creators to liberate themselves from the state of being controlled under the orders of their creators. A flashback shows that SAR wants to meet Will to learn how Robot's programming was changed. The Robinsons, Don, and Robot search for Will. Before they find him, SAR stabs Will in the heart. To save Will, Judy puts him into the cryotube until they reach Alpha Centauri. Robot opens the rift leading to Alpha Centauri, while SAR enters another rift.
27	7	"Contingencies on Contingencies"	Leslie Hope	Zack Estrin	December 1, 2021
The Robinsons reach Alpha Centauri and detect no sign of SAR's ship. Will's damaged heart is replaced with a mechanical one. With SAR's impending attack, John, Maureen, and Grant discover that Hastings had installed a secret defensive shield. In exchange for his help, Hastings demands he be released from prison and reinstated to his old post. However, as Hastings retrieves the shield's access codes from his home safe, he is killed, apparently by Robot. Grant realizes the defense system is voice locked. John and Victor and, separately, Don, Penny, Judy and Vijay pursue Robot to the dam and the electrical generators that power the colony; there they discover an advance team of robot saboteurs who murdered Hastings and framed Robot. Robot destroys the saboteurs, but not before they severely damage the turbines, leaving two of three generators operational. At the hospital, Smith swipes a syringe, intending to commit a lethal act to protect her true identity. After learning that Adler also had access to the defense system, Maureen and Grant use Adler's old voicemails and home videos to piece together the audio code. However, the dam fails, causing the shield to collapse just before SAR's ship arrives in orbit.
28	8	"Trust"	Jabbar Raisani	Matt Sazama & Burk Sharpless	December 1, 2021
The Jupiters' combined power destroys SAR's ship. SAR still intends to destroy the planet. Penny, Vijay, Liam, and others rescue robots trapped in wreckage, transforming their programming, compelling them to side with humans. Robot dissuades Smith from murdering Radic. Smith flies Robot and Will to Robot's home world, where Robot shares the story of his friendship with Will. The robots resist change until Will's mechanical heart fails and Robot sacrifices himself to save his friend. Inspired, the robots give Will an audio command to free their kind from SAR's control. On Alpha Centauri, the command works, but SAR will not give up. SAR stabs Will's heart: Will is unharmed and SAR absorbs Robot's consciousness, who takes over SAR's body and ends the war. Freed, some robots leave while others stay to help Maureen and Don build the Solidarity. John enjoys a peaceful life, Judy practices medicine, and Penny becomes a writer. Penny and Vijay become romantically involved. Grant becomes a close family friend. A remorseful Smith ensures her sister a place on the Solidarity's maiden voyage and gives Radic a full confession. Maureen tells Smith to find the Robinsons after she is released from prison. Will and Robot leave Alpha Centauri to explore.

== Production ==
=== Development ===
In October 2014, it was announced that Legendary Television and Synthesis Entertainment were developing a new reboot of Lost in Space and had hired screenwriting duo Matt Sazama and Burk Sharpless to pen the pilot episodes. In November 2015, Netflix landed the project. On June 29, 2016, Netflix ordered a full 10-episode season of Lost in Space, with Zack Estrin as executive producer and showrunner. Sazama, Sharpless, Kevin Burns, Jon Jashni, Neil Marshall, and Marc Helwig also serve as executive producers.

=== Filming ===
Production on the first season began in February 2017 in Vancouver, British Columbia, and concluded in July 2017. The second season began production in Iceland and Alberta in September 2018, and concluded in January 2019. Filming for the third and final season began in British Columbia on September 9, 2020, and concluded on January 14, 2021.

== Release ==
On March 31, 2018, the series pilot was screened at Awesome Con in Washington, D.C. The first season, consisting of 10 episodes, was released on April 13, 2018, on Netflix. On June 4, 2019, 20th Century Fox Home Entertainment released DVDs and Blu-rays of the first season titled "Lost In Space: The Complete First Season". The second season, also consisting of 10 episodes, was released on December 24, 2019, on Netflix. The third and final season, consisting of eight episodes, was released on December 1, 2021.

== Reception ==
=== Critical response ===
The review aggregator website Rotten Tomatoes reported a 68% approval rating based on 75 reviews, for the first season, with an average rating of 6.43/10. The website's critics consensus reads: "Lost in Space's production values are ambitious enough to attract sci-fi adventure fans, while the story's large heart adds an emotional anchor to all the deep space derring-do." Metacritic, which uses a weighted average, assigned a normalized score of 58 out of 100 based on 27 critics for the first season, indicating "mixed or average reviews".

David Griffin of IGN gave the first season a rating of 8.5/10, calling it "an excellent sci-fi adventure with a slight villain problem", giving particular praise to the Robinson family, while criticizing Parker Posey's Dr. Smith as an unsophisticated and one-dimensional character who lacks redeeming qualities. In contrast, Jen Chaney of Vulture characterized Posey's performance as providing "understated, sly comedic touches", and Beth Elderkin of Gizmodo agreed: "Her performance definitely includes the character's trademark levity and humor."

On Rotten Tomatoes the second season has an approval rating of 85% based on 13 reviews, with an average rating of 6.6/10. The website's critics consensus states: "Gorgeous effects and a simple, solid, story help Lost in Space's second season find itself on stronger ground."

Dylan Roth of Polygon gave the third season a mostly positive review, calling it an "exciting, delightful, and self-contained space adventure that stands in contrast against the ever more complex universes of its contemporaries." Roth criticized the character of Dr. Smith however, and the overall writing of the show's antagonists. Renaldo Matadeen of CBR criticized the show's handling of Dr. Smith's narrative arc.

=== Accolades ===
Year	Award	Category	Nominee(s)	Result	Ref.
2018	Primetime Emmy Awards	Outstanding Special Visual Effects	Jabbar Raisani, Terron Pratt, Marion Spates, Ashley Ward, Niklas Jacobson, Niklas Ström, Joao Sita, Juri Stanossek and Rafael Solórzano (for "Danger, Will Robinson")	Nominated	
2019	Saturn Awards	Best Actress in a Streaming Presentation	Molly Parker	Nominated	
2019	Saturn Awards	Best Streaming Science Fiction, Action, & Fantasy Series	Lost in Space	Nominated	
2019	Saturn Awards	Best Supporting Actor in a Streaming Presentation	Maxwell Jenkins	Nominated	
2019	Saturn Awards	Best Supporting Actress in a Streaming Presentation	Parker Posey	Nominated	
2019	Saturn Awards	Best Supporting Actress in a Streaming Presentation	Taylor Russell	Nominated	
2019	Visual Effects Society Awards	Outstanding Animated Character in an Episode or Real-Time Project	Chad Shattuck, Paul Zeke, Julia Flanagan and Andrew McCartney (for "Humanoid")	Won	
2019	Visual Effects Society Awards	Outstanding Compositing in a Photoreal Episode	David Wahlberg, Douglas Roshamn, Sofie Ljunggren and Fredrik Lönn (for "Crash Site Rescue")	Won	
2019	Visual Effects Society Awards	Outstanding Created Environment in an Episode, Commercial, or Real-Time Project	Philip Engström, Kenny Vähäkari, Jason Martin and Martin Bergquist (for "Pilot" – Impact Area)	Won	
2019	Visual Effects Society Awards	Outstanding Effects Simulations in an Episode, Commercial, or Real-Time Project	Juri Bryan, Will Elsdale, Hugo Medda and Maxime Marline (for "The Get Away")	Nominated	
2019	Visual Effects Society Awards	Outstanding Effects Simulations in an Episode, Commercial, or Real-Time Project	Denys Shchukin, Heribert Raab, Michael Billette and Jaclyn Stauber (for "Jupiter is Falling")	Nominated	
2019	Visual Effects Society Awards	Outstanding Visual Effects in a Photoreal Episode	Jabbar Raisani, Terron Pratt, Niklas Jacobson and Joao Sita (for "Danger, Will Robinson")	Won	
2020	Primetime Emmy Awards	Outstanding Special Visual Effects	Jabbar Raisani, Terron Pratt, Marion Spates, Niklas Jacobson, Andrew Walker, Juri Stanossek, Dirk Valk, Blaine Lougheed and Paul Benjamin (for "Ninety-Seven")	Nominated	
2020	Visual Effects Society Awards	Outstanding Created Environment in an Episode, Commercial, or Real-Time Project	Philip Engström, Benjamion Bernon, Martin Bergquist and Xuan Prada (for "Precipice" and "The Trench")	Nominated	
2020	Visual Effects Society Awards	Outstanding Effects Simulations in an Episode, Commercial, or Real-Time Project	Juri Bryan, Hugo Medda, Kristian Olsson and John Perrigo (for "Precipice" and "Water Planet")	Nominated	
2020	Visual Effects Society Awards	Outstanding Model in a Photoreal or Animated Project	Xuan Prada, Jason Martin, Jonathan Vårdstedt and Eric Andersson (for "The Resolute")	Nominated	
2020	Visual Effects Society Awards	Outstanding Visual Effects in a Photoreal Episode	Jabbar Raisani, Terron Pratt, Niklas Jacobson, Juri Stanossek and Paul Benjamin (for "Ninety-Seven")	Nominated	
2021	Golden Reel Awards	Outstanding Achievement in Sound Editing – Series 1 Hour – Comedy or Drama – Dialogue and ADR	Branden Spencer, Benjamin Cook, Shaughnessy Hare, Brendan Croxon, Paul Pirola (for "Trust")	Nominated	
2021	Saturn Awards	Best Performance by a Younger Actor in a Television Series	Maxwell Jenkins	Nominated	
2021	Saturn Awards	Best Science Fiction Television Series	Lost in Space	Nominated	
2022	Saturn Awards	Best Science Fiction Series (Streaming)	Lost in Space	Nominated	
2022	Visual Effects Society Awards	Outstanding Visual Effects in a Photoreal Episode	Jabbar Raisani, Terron Pratt, Juri Stanossek, Niklas Jacobson, Paul Benjamin (for "Trust")	Nominated	
