= Marta Kristen =

American actress (born 1945)

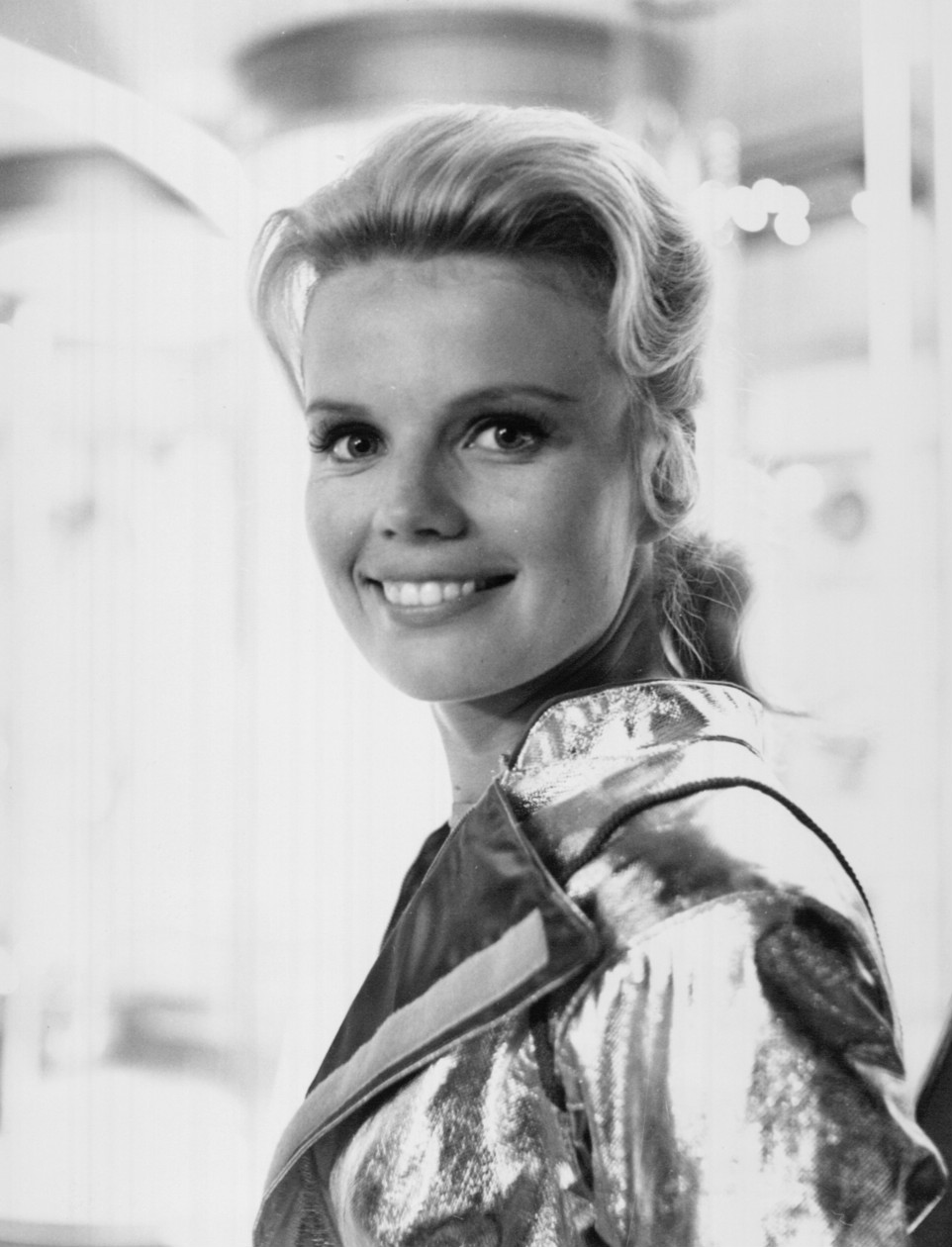
- Kristen as Judy Robinson in Lost in Space 1965
- Born: Birgit Annalisa Rusanen; 26 February 1945 (age 81); Oslo, Norway
- Other name: Martha Annalise Soderquist
- Occupation: Actress
- Years active: 1960–present
- Spouses: Terry Treadwell (m. 1964; div. 1973); Kevin P. Kane (m. 1978; died 2016)
- Children: 1

Martha Annalise Soderquist (born 26 February 1945), known by her stage name Marta Kristen, is an American actress. Born as Birgit Annalisa Rusanen in Norway to a Finnish mother and a German father, she was adopted by an American couple in 1949.

Kristen is best known for her role as Judy Robinson, the oldest child of Professor John Robinson and his wife, Maureen, in the television series Lost in Space (1965–1968). Her character was a young adult, around 20 years of age.

== Early life ==
Kristen was born Birgit Annalisa Rusanen in Oslo, Norway, as a war child to a Finnish mother and a German soldier father during the Lapland War that was fought between Finland and Nazi Germany. Her father was killed during World War II, and her mother gave up little Birgit to save her the pain of growing up knowing her real parents were part of the Nazi regime or Third Reich. Birgit spent her first years in an orphanage in Norway, and was then adopted in 1949 by a couple from Detroit, Michigan, Harold Oliver Soderquist and his wife, Bertha, who renamed her Martha Annalise Soderquist. Her adoptive father was a professor of education at Wayne State University, also in Detroit. Kristen has one brother, whom her parents also adopted.

In 1959, Kristen moved to the Los Angeles area while her father was on sabbatical leave from his professorship. She remained there with a guardian and graduated from Santa Monica High School.

== Career ==
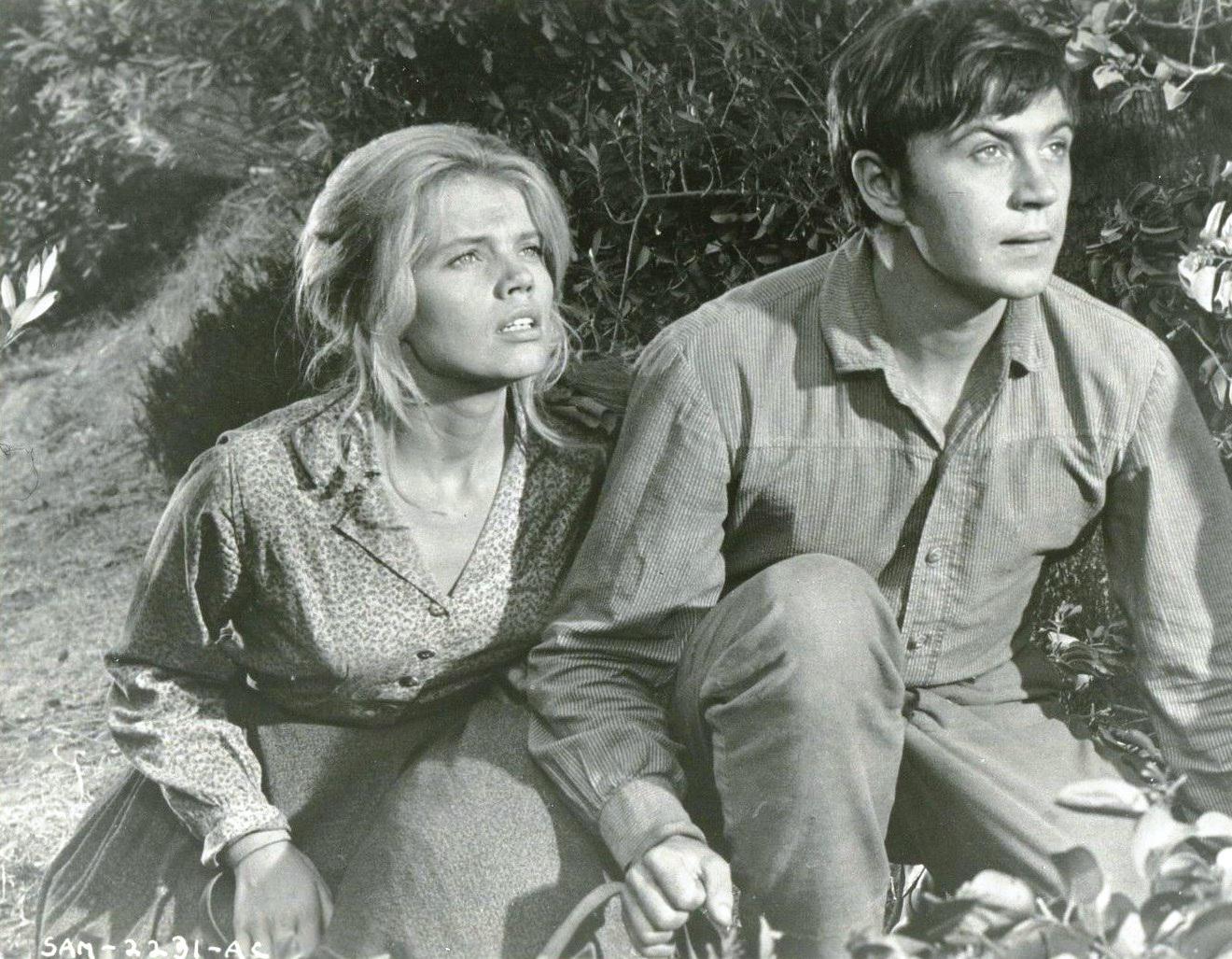
Kristen and Tommy Kirk in Savage Sam

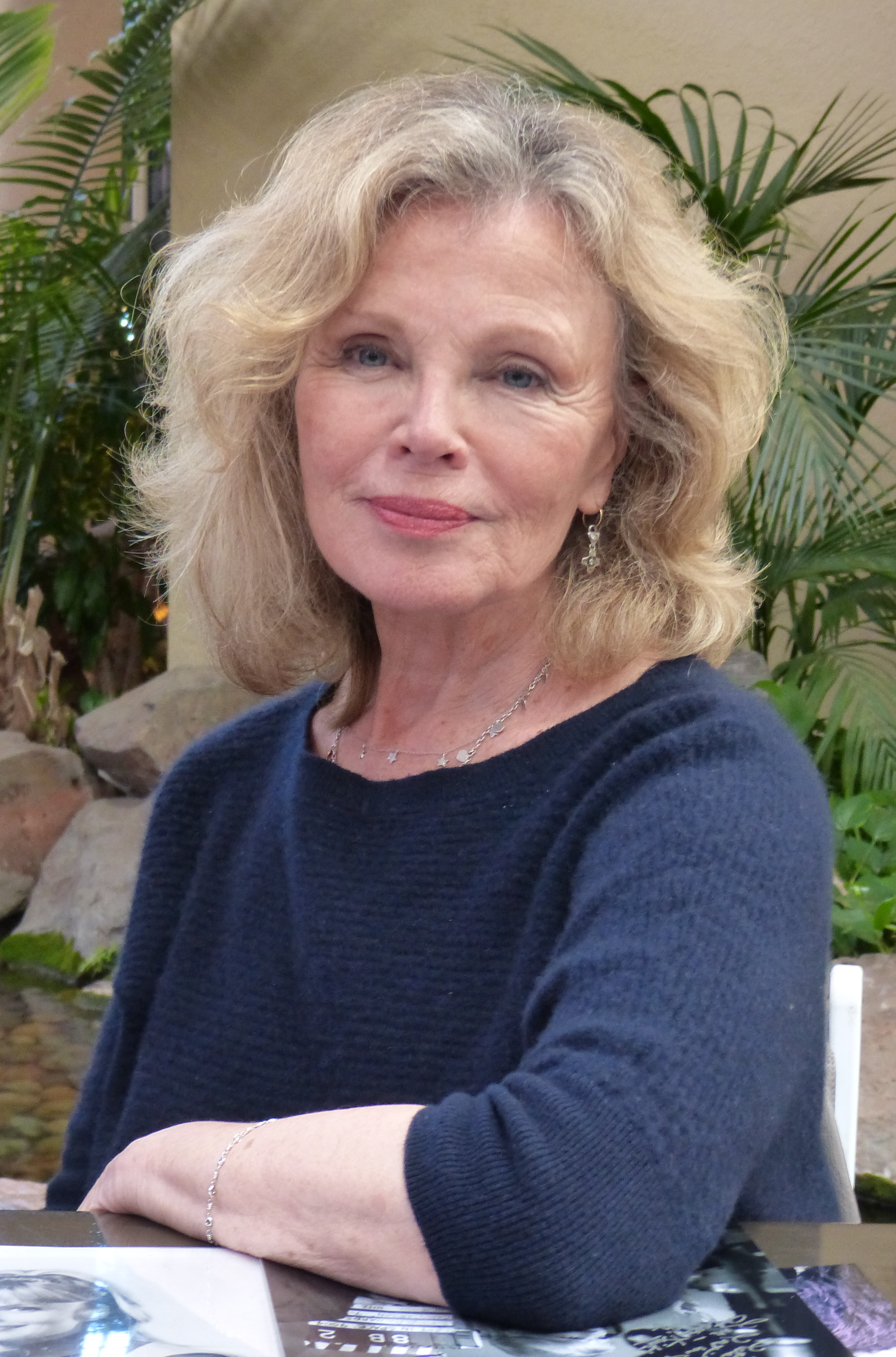
Marta Kristen in 2018

Reflecting her Nordic heritage, Kristen adopted the more European-sounding "Marta" and used Marta Kristen as her stage name. She first appeared in a 1961 episode of Alfred Hitchcock Presents, "Bang! You're Dead", alongside Billy Mumy, who later co-starred with Kristen in Lost in Space. In 1963, she starred with Tony Dow in "Four Feet in the Morning," an episode of The Eleventh Hour, and as Peggy Meredith on My Three Sons.

Kristen's first film role was in the 1963 Walt Disney production of Savage Sam. She played the role of Lorelei in the 1965 movie Beach Blanket Bingo.

Kristen starred in Lost in Space from its beginning in 1965 until its cancellation in 1968. Afterwards, she had a daughter, born in 1969, and appeared in more than forty television commercials as well as making numerous guest appearances on television shows. She also appeared in the A&E biography Jonathan Harris: Never Fear, Smith Is Here in 2002.

She also made the occasional film appearance in movies such as Terminal Island (1973), Once in 1974, appearing as a bare breasted 'Humanity', and the science-fiction film Battle Beyond the Stars (1980); and had a cameo role in the 1998 movie Lost in Space. Kristen also provided voice work for the 2009 animated theatrical short "The Bolt Who Screwed Christmas" which also included voice work from her Lost in Space co-stars Harris, Mumy, and Angela Cartwright.

== Personal life ==
Kristen has been married twice. Her first marriage was to Terry Treadwell, a psychologist. She met her second husband, Kevin P. Kane, in 1974 and they married on 18 November 1978. They lived in Santa Monica, California, with two rescue dogs until 2016, when Kristen announced on her Facebook page that Kane had died.

== Selected filmography ==
- The Loretta Young Show (1960) (Season 8 Episode 7: The Glass Cage) as Bonnie
- My Three Sons (1960) (Season 1 Episode 11: The Mechanic) as Peggy Meredith (Pig) Robbie’s love interest
- Leave It to Beaver (1961) (Season 4 Episode 25: "Wally and Dudley") as Christine Staples
- Alfred Hitchcock Presents (1961) (Season 6 Episode 31: "The Gloating Place") as Marjorie Stone
- Alfred Hitchcock Presents (1961) (Season 7 Episode 2: "Bang! You're Dead") as Jiffy Snack Girl
- My Three Sons (1962) (Season 3 Episode 14: "Going Steady") as Linda Francis
- The Dick Powell Show (1963) (Season 2 Episode 26: "The Third Side of a Coin") as Joan Kent
- Two-part crossover:
  - Dr. Kildare (1963) (Season 3 Episode 9: "Four Feet in the Morning") as Darleen Landon
  - The Eleventh Hour (1963) (Season 2 Episode 9: "Four Feet in the Morning") as Darleen Landon
- My Three Sons (1964) (Season 5 Episode 2: "A Serious Girl") as Lorraine Pendleton
- The Man from U.N.C.L.E. (1964) (Season 1 Episode 11: "The Neptune Affair") as Felicia Lavimore
- The Greatest Show on Earth (1964) (Season 1 Episode 21: "Clancy") as Billie Jo
- Mr. Novak (1964) (Season 1 Episode 30: "The Senior Prom") as Gail Andrews
- Wagon Train (1965) (Season 8 Episode 16: "The Wanda Snow Story") as Wanda Snow
- Beach Blanket Bingo (1965) (Feature Film Unrated 1h 38m) as Lorelei
- Lost in Space (1965 - 1968) (3 Seasons 84 Episodes) as Judy Robinson
- Insight (1969) (Season 1 Episode 317: "Is the 11:59 Late This Year?") as Chick
- The Mephisto Waltz (1971) (Feature Film R 1h 55m) as Party Guest (uncredited)
- Mannix (1965) (Season 6 Episode 15: "A Game of Shadows") as Aileen
- Terminal Island (1973) (Feature Film R 1h 28m) as Lee Phillips
- Once (1973) (Feature Film R 1h 40m) as Humanity
- Gemini Affair (1975) (Feature Film X 1h 32m) as Julie
- Project U.F.O. (1978) (Season 1 Episode 11: "Sighting 4011: The Dollhouse Incident") as Anita
- Battle Beyond the Stars (1980) (Feature Film PG 1h 44m) as Lux
- Remington Steele (1982) (Season 1 Episode 4: "Signed, Steeled and Delivered") as Blonde
- Fame (1985) (Season 4 Episode 17: "Danny De Bergerac") as Dede Callahan
- Trapper John, M.D. (1985) (Season 6 Episode 20: "In the Eyes of the Beholder") as Mrs. Christopher
- Wildside (1985) (Season 1 Episode 3: "The Crimea of the Century") as Ellen Jonsen
- Scarecrow and Mrs. King (1987) (Season 4 Episode 14: "Rumors of My Death") as Lena Spickens
- Strange Voices (1987) (TV Movie Not Rated 1h 40m) as Mona
- Murphy Brown (1994) (Season 6 Episode 18: "Fjord Eyes Only") as Norwegian Mom
- Panic in the Park (1995) (Video Game) as Annabelle Lee
- Harvest of Fire (1996) (TV Movie PG 1h 39m) as Martha Troyer
- Below Utopia (1997) (Feature Film R 1h 28m) as Marilyn Beckett
- Lost in Space (1998) (Feature Film PG-13 2h 10m) as Reporter #1
- The Bolt Who Screwed Christmas (2009) (Short Film 7m) as Mrs. Ratchet(voice)
- Lost in Space: The Epilogue (2015) (Video) as Judy Robinson
- Ageless (2016) (TV Short 18m) as Phyllis
- Breaking Point (2018) (Short) as Debby
- The Vamps Next Door (2019) (Season 6 Episode 1: "Party in the Cul-De-Sac") as Astrid
- The Vamps Next Door (2019) (Season 6 Episode 2: "Chaos in the Cul-De-Sac") as Astrid
- The Vamps Next Door (2019) (Season 6 Episode ?: "Beverly's Birthday Bash") as Astrid
- Last Day (2021) (Short 16m) as Mila
- Brenda & Oliver (2022) (Short) as Brenda
- A Reluctant Heart (2022) (Feature Film - Original title: A Bachelor's Valentine) as Inez Burr
- Benny the Barnacle (2022) (Animation - Believing is Seeing Episode aired Dec 23, 2022) as Serenity Seahorse
