= Falling You =

US musical group

- Origin: San Francisco, California, U.S.
- Genres: Ambient; Ethereal wave Dream pop
- Years active: 1998 - Present
- Labels: Fossil Dungeon; Magnatune; Projekt
- Members: John Michael Zorko
- Website: www.fallingyou.com I

Falling You is an American ambient/electronic project based in San Francisco, California, United States. The band was founded by composer and musician, John Michael Zorko, with then-partner, Jennifer McPeak, serving as lyricist and vocalist. After their 1998 debut album, Mercy, the couple broke up and the band seemed to go on hiatus. In the early 2000s Zorko began collaborating with a rotating roster of female vocalists on new music, though McPeak continued to contribute sporadically to subsequent albums. Notable guest vocalists include Dru Allen (This Ascension, Mirabilis), Victoria Lloyd (Claire Voyant), Suzanne Perry (Love Spirals Downwards), Anji Bee (Lovespirals), Monica Richards (Faith and the Muse), Amanda Kramer (Golden Palominos), Shikhee (Android Lust), Kirsty Hawkshaw (Delerium), Aimee Page, Sara Ayers, and Erica Mulkey (Unwoman).

The work of Falling You tends to center thematically on some core part of the human condition. As a general rule the song lyrics and vocal melodies are written by the vocalist, working in collaboration with Zorko to fit his composition and album theme. Over the years, the musical project has explored and combined genres including ambient electronica, ethereal darkwave, melodic space-rock, and dream-pop centered largely on Heavenly Voices style vocals. For many years the band used the tagline “the beauty of the female voice,” in their promotional materials.

== Discography ==
=== Albums ===
- Mercy (CD) - 1998
- Touch (CD) - 2005
- Human (CD) - 2006
- Faith (CD) - 2008
- Adore (CD/Download) - 2011
- Blush (CD/Download) - 2013
- Shine (CD/Download) - 2017
- Metanoia (Download) - 2025

== See also ==
- List of ambient music artists
