= Anti-M =

Anti-M is a Santa Barbara based mostly electronic rock band. The band had the fortune of working with Ronnie Montrose, who played guitar as a guest on Anti-M's second album, Positively Negative.

== History and description ==
The band's discography includes No Waves in Hell, Positively Negative, and It H-Hurts, the Instrumentals. A remastered version of Positively Negative features two bonus track instrumentals that include guitarist Ronnie Montrose who formed the band Montrose and starting the career of singer Sammy Hagar. The album Damage was released in 2008. It features a guest performance by bassist Tim Landers who has played with various talent including Tori Amos, Vince Neil, Stevie Nicks, Al Di Meola and Billy Cobham. Landers can be heard during the guitar solo on the title track. The style of the album is dark and gothic with a mix of influences from bands like Within Temptation, Evanescence and electronica like Depeche Mode. In 2010 the band released the EP Damaged Little Things, an album of alternate takes and unreleased songs and demos

Anti-M have provided music for several films. They include You Only Die Once, a direct-to-video James Bond spoof, Hawaiian Surf Stories (a series of surf films from North Shore Oahu), and "The Bolt Who Screwed Christmas", an award-winning animated short written and directed by Anti-M founding member John "Wedge" Wardlaw.

A covers album titled Pieces was released in 2019. Like Damage the cover art is by surreal artist Ora Tamir. The album features guest musicians and vocalists including Dru Allen, Mirabilis, and Todd Simpson. Artists covered include Depeche Mode, Garbage, King Crimson, Delain, The Gathering, 'Til Tuesday, Berlin, and Fur Patrol.

== Members ==
- John "Wedge" Wardlaw (1986— ): keyboards, vocals, guitar, bass
- Mark Rumer (1986–1995): keyboards, programming, voice
- Ruston (1992—2009): keyboards, vocals, bass
- Steve "Salty" Weber (1992–1995): guitar
- Jon (2005—2019): guitarist
- Barbara (1995—2019): vocals, guitar, bass
- Derek Poultney (2005— ): drums, drum programming

== Guest performers ==
- Ronnie Montrose (1995): guitars on "Positively Negative"
- Tim Landers (2008): bass on "Damage"
- Nan Avant: piano on unreleased version of Love Reign O'er Me (The Who Cover)
- Dru Allen: (vocalist for Mercury's Antennae, This Ascension; Mirabilis) sings on "Nighttime Birds" - The Gathering Cover, "Milk" - Garbage cover, "In Your Room" - Depeche Mode cover; on album "Pieces"
- Alexa: Vocals on "See Me In Shadow" - Delain cover; on album "Pieces"
- Todd Simpson: Various guitars on album "Pieces"
- Marcus Baertschi: Bass guitar on album "Pieces"

== Discography ==
=== Albums ===
Year	Title
1992	No Waves in Hell
1995	Positively Negative
2000	It H-Hurts the Instrumentals
2008	Damage
2009	Damage — Instrumental Version
2009	Positively Negative — Instrumental Version
2010	Damaged Little Things EP
2019	Pieces
