= The Bolt Who Screwed Christmas =

2009 short film directed by John Wardlaw

- Directed by: John Wardlaw
- Written by: John Wardlaw
- Starring: Jonathan Harris; Tress MacNeille; Bill Mumy; Angela Cartwright; Marta Kristen
- Music by: Gary Stockdale; Anti-m
- Release dates: 2009 (Los Angeles Reel Film Festival); 2010 (Santa Barbara International Film Festival)
- Running time: 8 minutes
- Country: United States
- Language: English

The Bolt Who Screwed Christmas is a 2009 independent animated short film parody of How the Grinch Stole Christmas! written and directed by John Wardlaw and animated by Andy Angrand. The film features the final performance of actor Jonathan Harris and co-stars Tress MacNeille. The film also features an original score by Gary Stockdale and music by director John Wardlaw's band, Anti-m.

== Jonathan Harris ==
Written in 1997, the script was presented to Jonathan Harris in 1998 and his voice work was actually recorded in 2000. He died on November 3, 2002, making it his last film. In 2006 an additional scene was added to the film and Jonathan Harris' former Lost In Space co-stars Bill Mumy, Angela Cartwright and Marta Kristen added their voices to the film. The film was dedicated to his memory.

== Production and release ==
Completed in 2009, the film first appeared at the non-theatrical 2009 Los Angeles Reel Film Festival where it was honored with three awards. In 2010 it made its theatrical world premier in film-maker John Wardlaw's home town at the 25th Annual Santa Barbara International Film Festival (SBIFF). Between December 2009 and December 2011, it played in 30 film festivals, winning 13 awards. Its final theatrical appearance was at L’hybride in Lille France.

In 2011 it was released on DVD as part of a collection of short films and music videos by Wardlaw. The DVD bonus features include early animations and audio outtakes. The film was licensed to ShortsHD and ShortsTV in 2014.

== Reception ==
"It had a great animation style, clever and slightly naughty story (well put together) and was totally enjoyable!" claimed D. C. Fontana;

"I laughed my nuts off," stated David Gerrold.

=== Awards ===
Award	Festival / Year
2nd Place Best Animation	LARFF Los Angeles Reel Film Festival 2009
Best Animated Characters	LARFF Los Angeles Reel Film Festival 2009
Best Animation Story	LARFF Los Angeles Reel Film Festival 2009
VSM Excellence Award For Animation	VSM (Very Short Movie) Film Festival 2010
Accolade Award Of Merit for Animation	Accolade Film Awards 2010
Best Animated Comedy	Dragon Con 2010
Silver Telly Awards: Non-Broadcast Productions - Use of Humor; Use of Animation; Entertainment	The Telly Awards 2010
Best Animation	The Ventura Film Festival 2010
Best Animated Film	The Nevada Film Festival 2010
Best Animated Short Comedy	The Indie Gathering 2011
Best Of Faux Audience Choice Award	Faux Film Fest 2011
Nomination Best Animated Visuals	Los Angeles Reel Film Festival 2009
Nomination Best Animation Sound Design	Los Angeles Reel Film Festival 2009
Nomination Best Voice Over Jonathan Harris	Los Angeles Reel Film Festival 2009
Nomination Best Voice Over Tress MacNeille	Los Angeles Reel Film Festival 2009
Nomination Best Original Score	Los Angeles Reel Film Festival 2009

== See also ==
- List of Christmas films
