= Bill Mumy =

American actor (born 1954)

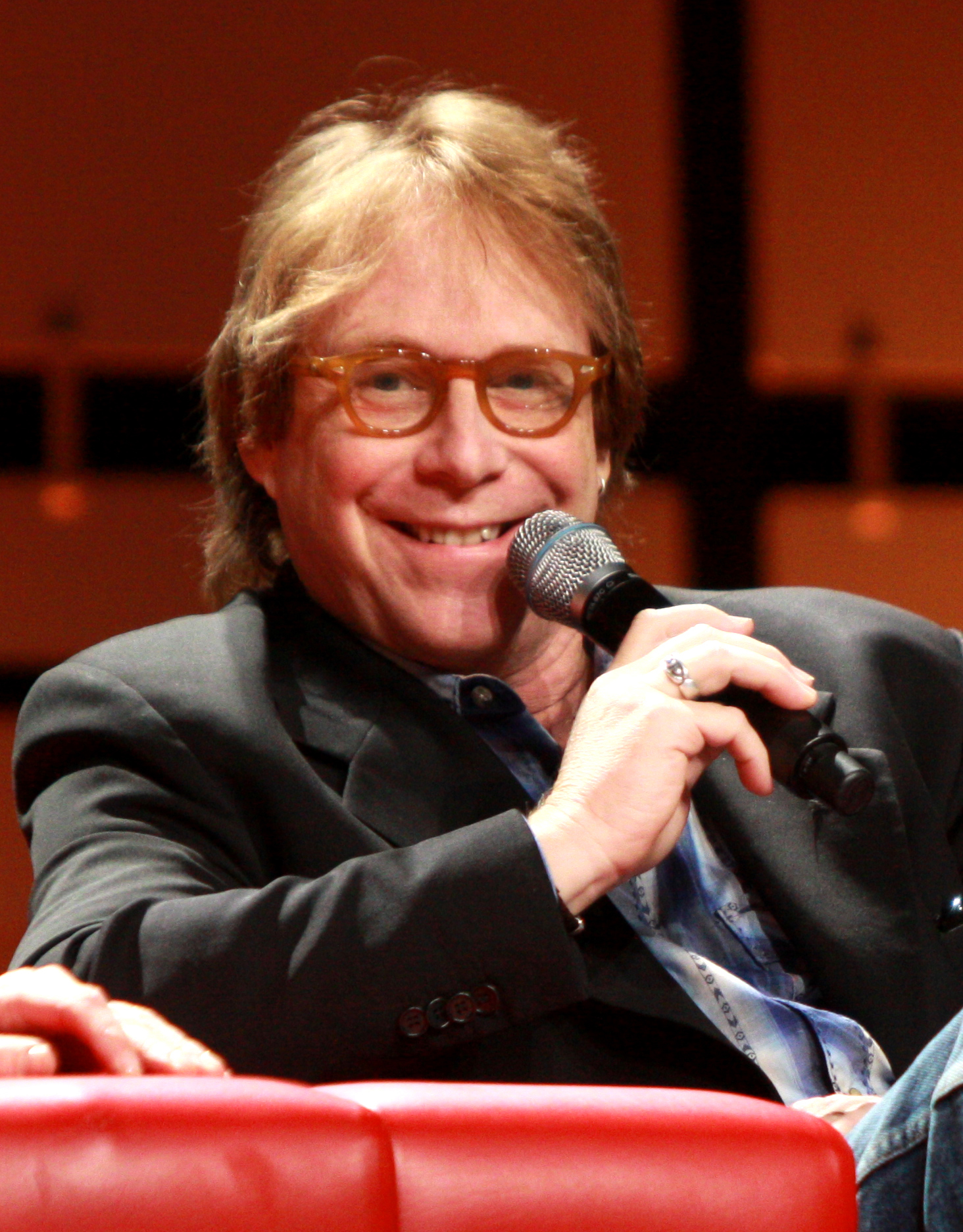
- Mumy in 2013
- Born: Charles William Mumy Jr. February 1, 1954 (age 72); San Gabriel, California, U.S.
- Occupations: Actor; musician; writer; producer
- Years active: 1960−present
- Spouse: Eileen Joy Davis (m. 1986)
- Children: 2, including Liliana
- Awards: Inkpot Award (2015)
- Website: www.billmumy.com

Charles William Mumy Jr. (/ˈmuːmi/; born February 1, 1954) is an American actor, writer, producer, and musician. He came to prominence in the 1960s as a child actor (credited as "Billy Mumy"), whose work included television appearances on Bewitched, I Dream of Jeannie, The Twilight Zone, Alfred Hitchcock Presents, and a role in the film Dear Brigitte, followed by a three-season role as Will Robinson in the 1960s sci-fi series Lost in Space. Mumy later appeared as lonely teenager Sterling North in the film Rascal (1969) and Teft in the film Bless the Beasts and Children (1971).

In the 1990s, Mumy performed the role of Lennier in all five seasons of the sci-fi TV series Babylon 5 and narrated the Emmy Award–winning series Biography.

Mumy is also a guitarist, singer, songwriter, and composer. He is an Emmy nominee for original music in Adventures in Wonderland (1992). As a musician, Mumy performs as a solo artist, an occasional guest performer, and formerly as half of the duo Barnes & Barnes before bandmate Robert Haimer died in 2023. From 1988 through the 1990s he performed at San Diego Comic-Con and other comics-related events as part of the band Seduction of the Innocent (named after the titular book by Fredric Wertham). The band released one CD, The Golden Age.

== Early life and career ==
Charles William Mumy Jr. was born on February 1, 1954, in San Gabriel, California, to Charles William Mumy, a cattle rancher, and Muriel Gertrude Mumy (née Gould). He began his professional career at age seven and has worked on more than four hundred television episodes, eighteen films, various commercials, and scores of voiceover projects. He has also worked as a musician, songwriter, recording artist, and writer.

== Television and film career ==
Among Mumy's earliest television roles was six-year-old Willy in the "Donald's Friend" (1960) episode of the NBC-TV family drama series National Velvet, starring Lori Martin. He starred in three episodes of CBS-TV's original Twilight Zone: "It's a Good Life" (S3 E8 November 1961), as six-year-old Anthony, who terrorizes his town with psychic powers (a role he later reprised along with his daughter Liliana in the "It's Still a Good Life" episode of the second revival series); "In Praise of Pip" (September 1963), as a vision of Jack Klugman's long-neglected dying son; and "Long Distance Call" (March 1961) as Billy Bayles, who talks to his dead grandmother through a toy telephone.

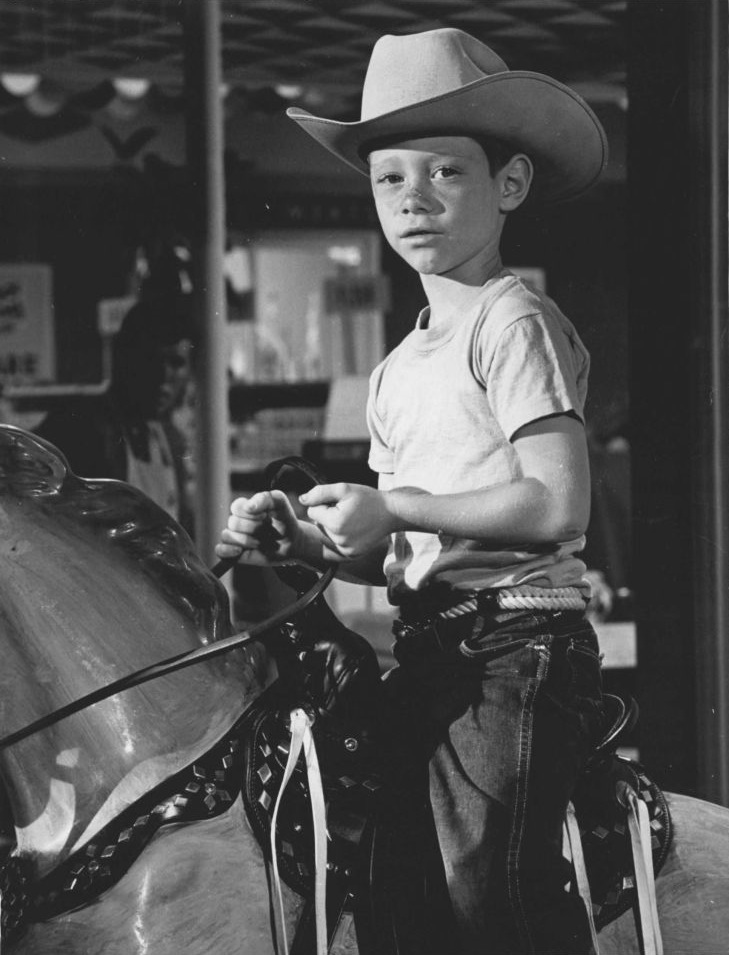
Mumy in the Alfred Hitchcock Presents episode "Bang! You're Dead", 1961

In 1961, Mumy was cast on CBS-TV's Alfred Hitchcock Presents series in "The Door Without a Key", featuring John Larch, who played his father in "It's a Good Life". The same year, Mumy starred as little Jackie in the episode "Bang! You're Dead", featuring Marta Kristen, who later played his sister Judy on Lost in Space. Mumy was cast as Mark Murdock in the "Keep an Eye on Santa Claus" (1962) episode of the ABC-TV drama series Going My Way, starring Gene Kelly. His fellow guest stars were Cloris Leachman (who played his mother in "It's a Good Life"), Steve Brodie, and Frank McHugh.

At age eight, Mumy appeared in Jack Palance's ABC-TV circus drama The Greatest Show on Earth (1963); he was cast as Miles, a parentless boy, in the Perry Mason episode "The Case of the Shifty Shoebox" (1963), and he portrayed Freddy in the "End of an Image" (1963) episode of NBC-TV's modern Western series Empire, starring Richard Egan.

In 1964, he was cast as Richard Kimble's nephew in ABC-TV's The Fugitive episode, "Home Is the Hunted"; as Barry in the NBC-TV medical drama The Eleventh Hour episode "Sunday Father"; as himself three times in the ABC sitcom The Adventures of Ozzie and Harriet; in the Disney film For the Love of Willadena; and as a troubled orphan taken in by the Stephenses in the Bewitched fantasy sitcom episode "A Vision of Sugarplums" (December 1964), on ABC-TV.

Mumy was reportedly the first choice to portray Eddie Munster in the 1964 CBS situation comedy The Munsters, but his parents objected to the extensive makeup requirements. The role instead went to Butch Patrick. Mumy appeared in one episode as a friend of Eddie.

Mumy guest starred in an episode of NBC-TV's I Dream of Jeannie, "Whatever Became of Baby Custer?" (1965). That same year, he also appeared in an episode of Bewitched titled "Junior Executive" (1965), in which he played a young Darrin Stephens.

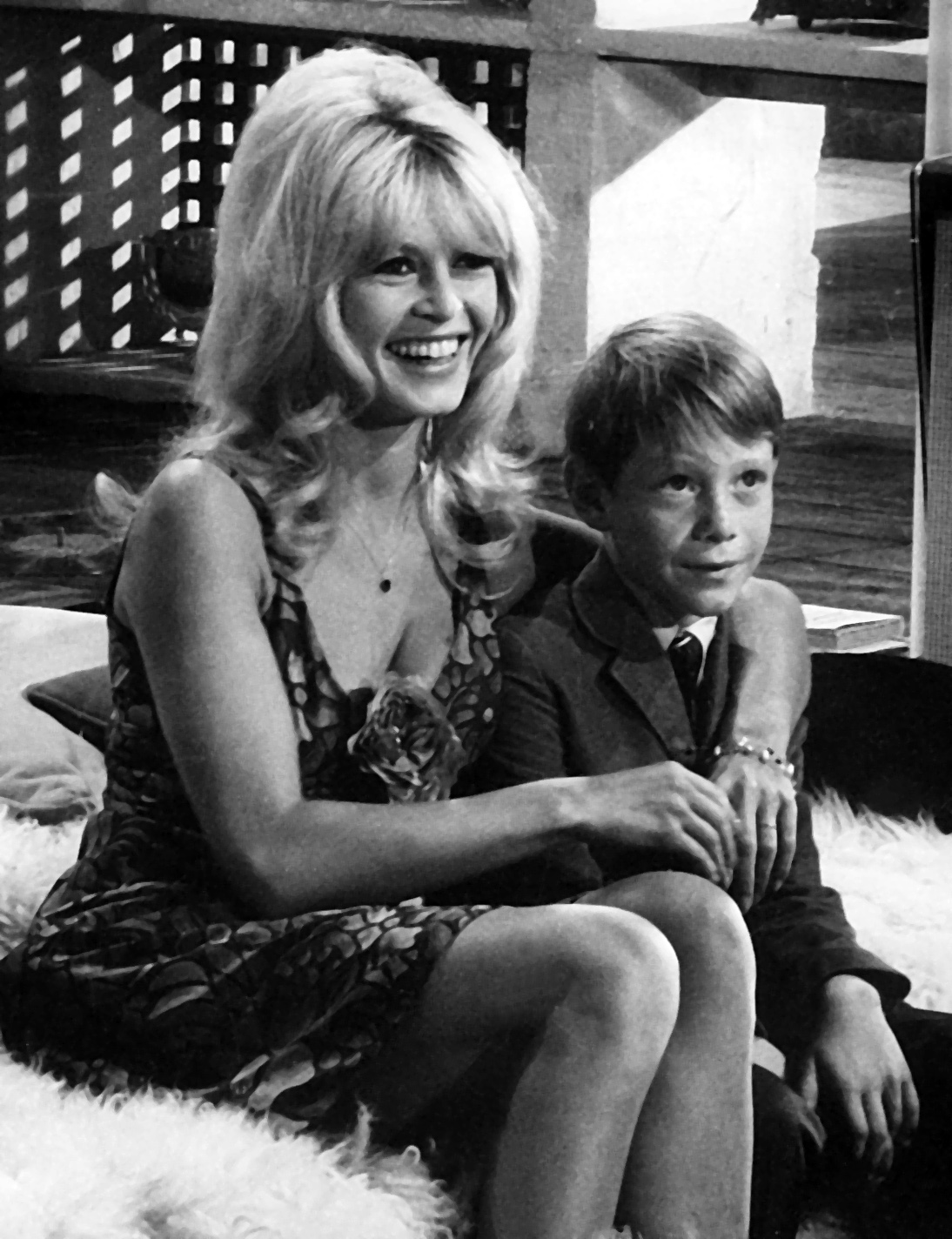
Bill Mumy with Brigitte Bardot in Dear Brigitte, 1965

Mumy starred in Dear Brigitte (1965), a film adaptation of the novel Erasmus with Freckles, as Erasmus Leaf, a child mathematical genius who develops a crush on Brigitte Bardot (played by herself in the film). His parents, played by James Stewart and Glynis Johns, attempt to manage his obsession.

=== Lost in Space and beyond ===
Mumy's major breakthrough in Hollywood came when he was chosen to portray 9-year-old Will Robinson in the science fiction series Lost in Space, which aired on CBS from 1965 to 1968. Over the span of 84 episodes, his character was the recipient of numerous warnings (famously including, "Danger, Will Robinson!") from the show's robot character, B-9.

Mumy was later cast in Bless the Beasts and Children (1971) as Teft, a leader in a group of misfit teenage boys resolved to save a herd of bison from hunters. He also played a musician friend of Cliff DeYoung's character in the television film Sunshine (1973), later reprising the role in Sunshine Christmas (1977) and in the TV series Sunshine (1975). In 1974, Mumy played Nick Butler in the pilot episode of NBC's The Rockford Files and made an appearance in a later episode in season 1 as a sidewalk artist. In 1988, he played Ben Matlock's genius nephew, Dr. Irwin Bruckner, on Matlock.

In 1996, Mumy was a writer and co-creator of Space Cases, a Nickelodeon television show with themes similar to those of Lost in Space. Between 1994 and 1998, he played the ambassadorial aide Lennier in the syndicated science fiction series Babylon 5. In November 1998, he played Kellin, a Starfleet officer, in the Star Trek: Deep Space Nine episode "The Siege of AR-558", in which he assists in defeating a Jem'Hadar detachment. To Mumy's delight, his character was human this time due to makeup time and his distaste at being known as an "alien actor"; while playing Lennier in Babylon 5, he was required to wear prosthetic makeup. Mumy later appeared in a 2006 episode of Crossing Jordan and in the Syfy original film A.I. Assault.

In 2018, Mumy appeared in the pilot episode of the Netflix remake series Lost in Space. His character's name is Dr. Z. Smith, in homage to the character played by Jonathan Harris in the 1965 television series.

== Voice acting career ==
Mumy has narrated over 50 episodes of the Arts & Entertainment Network's Biography series, as well as hosted and narrated several other documentaries and specials for A&E, Animal Planet, The Sci-Fi Channel, and E!. He has also worked on animated shows such as Ren and Stimpy, Scooby-Doo, Batman: The Animated Series, Steven Spielberg's Animaniacs, Bravest Warriors, The Oz Kids and Disney's Buzz Lightyear of Star Command and Doc McStuffins.

Mumy's work also includes voice overs in national commercials for Bud Ice, Farmers Insurance, Ford, Blockbuster, Twix, Oscar Mayer and McDonald's.

== Music ==
Mumy plays the banjo, bass, guitar, harmonica, keyboards, mandolin, and percussion. His various musical credits include songs he has written and recorded with America, performed on tour with Shaun Cassidy, and played with Rick Springfield's band in the film Hard to Hold. He created the band The Be Five with other Babylon 5 actors.

He and Marta Kristen performed "Sloop John B" in the Lost in Space S3E14 episode Castles In Space.

At age 16, he formed a novelty act with childhood friend Robert Haimer that became Barnes and Barnes. Their song "Fish Heads" gained popularity after appearing on Barret Hansen’s Dr. Demento radio show. A video, directed by and featuring actor Bill Paxton, made MTV in the channel’s infancy.

Mumy has released a number of solo CDs, including Dying to Be Heard, In the Current, Pandora's Box, After Dreams Come True, Los Angeles Times and Ghosts.

He also performs with the Jenerators, a blues-rock band based in Los Angeles featuring Tom Hebenstreit on vocals, electric guitars, and keyboards; Mumy on vocals, acoustic and electric guitars, harmonica, keyboards and percussion; Gary Stockdale on vocals and bass; Miguel Ferrer on vocals, percussion and drums; David Jolliffe on guitar, percussion and vocals; and Chris Ross on drums and percussion. Additionally, Mumy released a Byrds tribute song, "When Roger Was Jim" (2012). In 2017, along with John Cowsill (The Cowsills) and Vicki Peterson (The Bangles) he founded the Action Skulls. Their first CD, Angels Hear, which also included posthumous contributions from the bassist Rick Rosas, was released on September 27, 2017.

Mumy produces and hosts The Real Good Radio Hour, a weekly series on KSAV Internet Radio focusing on various styles of music and the artists who pioneered them.

== Lost in Space activities in later years ==
In a 2010 interview on Blog Talk Radio's Lessons Learned, Rick Tocquigny was asked if Mumy was a Jonathan Harris fan before they appeared together on Lost in Space. Tocquigny stated that when Mumy was five years old, he was too young to watch his mentor's show The Third Man, which would have been aired late at night, but he was old enough to see The Bill Dana Show.

On June 14, 2006, Mumy got to work with Harris one last time, but posthumously. Years before Harris died, he recorded voice work for the animated short The Bolt Who Screwed Christmas, narrating the film and playing the part of The Bolt. As a tribute to Harris, writer-director John Wardlaw added a scene that reunited Lost in Space cast members Mumy, Marta Kristen, and Angela Cartwright as the animated Ratchett family.

Mumy appears in two episodes of the 2018 series Lost in Space on Netflix. He plays the role of Dr. Smith, whose identity is stolen by June Harris, the villain.

Mumy attends Lost in Space reunions and shows, and with Angela Cartwright, he co-authored a 2015 book, Lost (and Found) in Space. He and Cartwright co-authored the 2021 book, Lost (and Found) in Space 2: Blast Off into the Expanded Edition.

== Other work ==
Mumy and co-author Peter David published a short story, "The Black '59" (1992), in the anthology Shock Rock, edited by F. Paul Wilson.

He has also written a number of comics. With his friend, the late Miguel Ferrer, Mumy created Comet Man and Trypto the Acid Dog. They also co-wrote the Marvel Graphic Novel The Dreamwalker.

== Personal life ==
Mumy married Eileen Joy Davis on October 9, 1986. They live in Laurel Canyon, Los Angeles with their two children, including Liliana.

== Television and filmography ==
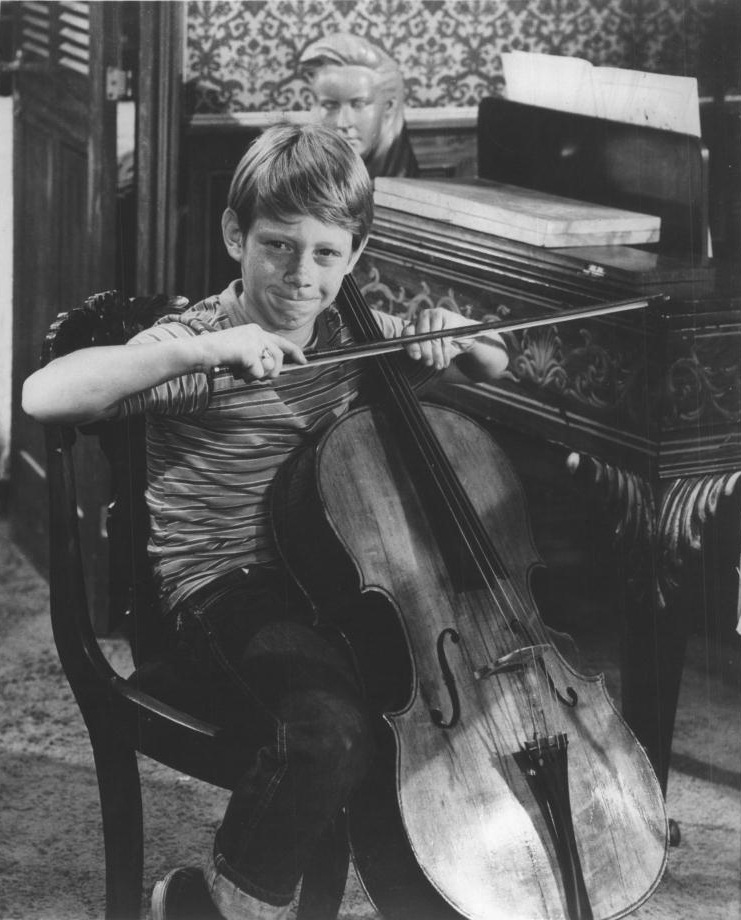
Mumy in Dear Brigitte, 1965

Year	Film/Television	Role	Notes
1960	The Tom Ewell Show	Jeffrey Nelson	Season 1 Episode 5: "Tom Puts the Girls to Work"
1961	The Twilight Zone	Billy Bayles	Season 2 Episode 22: "Long Distance Call"
1961	The Twilight Zone	Anthony Fremont	Season 3 Episode 8: "It's a Good Life"
1961	Alfred Hitchcock Presents	Jackie Chester	Season 7 Episode 2: "Bang, You're Dead"
1962	Alfred Hitchcock Presents	Mickey Hollins	Season 7 Episode 15: "The Door Without a Key"
1962	The Alfred Hitchcock Hour	Tony Mitchell	Season 1 Episode 8: "House Guest"
1962	Walt Disney's Wonderful World of Color	Petey Loomis	Episode: "Sammy, the Way-Out Seal"
1962	The Jack Benny Program	34-Lb Boy	Season 13 Episode 12: "Jack and the Crying Cab Driver"
1962	Wagon Train	Toddy	Season 6 Episode 15: "The Sam Darland Story"
1963	The Twilight Zone	young Pip Phillips	Season 5 Episode 1: "In Praise of Pip"
1963	A Child Is Waiting	Boy counting Jean's pearls	
1963	A Ticklish Affair	Alex Martin	
1963	Palm Springs Weekend	'Boom Boom' Yates	
1963	Perry Mason	Miles Jefferson	Season 7 Episode 2: "The Case of the Shifty Shoebox"
1964	Bewitched	Michael (Orphan Boy)	Season 1 Episode 15: "A Vision of Sugar Plums"
1964	The Adventures of Ozzie and Harriet	Billy	Season 13 Episode 2: "Rick's Old Printing Press"
1964	The Adventures of Ozzie and Harriet	Billy	Season 13 Episode 7: "The Pennies"
1964	The Adventures of Ozzie and Harriet	Billy	Season 13 Episode 8: "The Ballerina"
1965	Bewitched	Darrin	Season 2 Episode 10: "Junior Executive"
1965	The Virginian	Willy	Season 3 Episode 28: "Old Cowboy"
1965	Dear Brigitte	Erasmus 'Ras' Leaf	
1965	I Dream of Jeannie	Custer	Season 1 Episode 11: "Whatever Became of Baby Custer?"
1965	The Munsters	Googie Miller	Season 1 Episode 25: "Come Back Little Googie"
1965–68	Lost in Space	Will Robinson	84 episodes
1968	Wild in the Streets	Boy	Uncredited
1969	Rascal	Sterling North	
1969	Lancer	Andy Cutler	Season 2 Episode 3: "The Kid"
1970	Here Come the Brides	Simon Bill	Season 2 Episode 15: "Break the Bank of Tacoma"
1971	Bless the Beasts and Children	Teft	
1973	Papillon	Lariot	
1974	The Rockford Files	Nick Butler	Season 1 Episode: "Backlash of the Hunter" (pilot)
1975	The Rockford Files	Trask	Season 1 Episode 14: "Aura Lee, Farewell"
1975	Sunshine	Weaver	15 episodes
1983	Twilight Zone: The Movie	Tim (Segment #3)	
1984	Hard to Hold	Keyboard Player	
1988	Matlock	Dr. Irwin Bruckner	Season 2 Episode 20: "The Genius"
1990	Captain America	Young General Fleming	
1991	The Flash	Roger Braintree	Season 1 Episode 19: "Good Night, Central City"
1991	Superboy	Tommy Puck	Season 4 Episode 1: "A Change of Heart, Part 1"
1991	Superboy	Tommy Puck	Season 4 Episode 2: "A Change of Heart, Part 2"
1992	Superboy	Tommy Puck	Season 4 Episode 19: "Obituary for a Super Hero"
1992	Double Trouble	Bob	
1993	Ultraman: The Ultimate Hero	Fenton	Episode 5: "Monstrous Meltdown"
1994	Animaniacs	The Farmer	Voice, Season 1 Episode 62: "Witch One"
1994	The Ren & Stimpy Show	Dr. Brainchild	Voice, Season 4 Episode 3: "Blazing Entrails"
1994–98	Babylon 5	Lennier	109 episodes
1995	Batman: The Animated Series	Warren Lawford / Fox	Voice, Season 4 Episode 1: "The Terrible Trio"
1996	The Oz Kids	Sam	Voice
1997	The Weird Al Show	UPS Guy	Season 1 Episode 4: "Back to School
1997	Space Ghost Coast to Coast	Himself	Voice, episode: "Switcheroo '97"
1998	Star Trek: Deep Space Nine	Kellin	Season 7 Episode 8: "The Siege of AR-558"
1998	Lost in Space Forever	Himself / Will Robinson	TV special
2000	Buzz Lightyear of Star Command	Eon	Voice, Season 1 Episode 9: "Tag Team"
2000	Buzz Lightyear of Star Command	Eon	Voice, Season 1 Episode 19: "A Zoo Out There"
2003	The Twilight Zone	Adult Anthony Fremont	Season 1 Episode 30: "It's Still a Good Life"
2004	Comic Book: The Movie	Himself	Video
2006	Holly Hobbie & Friends	Bud Morris	Voice, Season 1 Episode 2: "Holly Hobbie and Friends: Christmas Wishes"
2009	The Bolt Who Screwed Christmas	Knob Ratchett	Theatrical short
2011	Ben 10: Ultimate Alien	Agent Bryson	Voice, Season 3 Episode 8: "The Widening Gyre"
2013–18	Bravest Warriors	Ralph Waldo Pickle Chips / Johnny Tezuka / Reverend Picklechips / Judge / President Fishhead	Voice, 11 episodes
2014	Transformers: Rescue Bots	Vigil	Voice, Season 2 Episode 14: "The Vigilant Town"
2014	Transformers: Rescue Bots	Vigil	Voice, Season 3 Episode 6: "No Place Like Dome"
2018	The Loud House	Timothy "Tim" McCole	Voice, Season 3 Episode 1: "A Fridge Too Far"
2018	Lost in Space (2018)	Dr. Zachary Smith	Season 1 Episode 1: "Impact"
2019	Lost in Space (2018)	Dr. Zachary Smith	Season 2 Episode 3: "Echoes"
2023	Babylon 5: The Road Home	Lennier	Voice, direct-to-video
2024	Space Command Redemption	Greg Mazzey	

== Books ==
- Cartwright, Angela; Bill Mumy (2016). Lost (and Found) in Space: We Planet That Way: A Memoir in Photographs. Stockbridge, MA: TV Classics Press. ISBN 9781944068233. OCLC 980498937.
- Cartwright, Angela; Bill Mumy (2021). Lost (and Found) in Space 2: Blast Off into the Expanded Edition. n/a: Next Chapter Publishing. ISBN 978-1735621531. OCLC 1285557101.
- Mumy, Bill (November 8, 2022). Danger Will Robinson: The Full Mumy. Next Chapter Entertainment LLC. ISBN 978-1735621548.

== Bibliography ==
- Dye, David (1988). Child and Youth Actors: Filmographies of Their Entire Careers, 1914–1985. Jefferson, NC: McFarland & Co. p. 166. ISBN 9780899502472. OCLC 17442407.
- Holmstrom, John (1996). The Moving Picture Boy: An International Encyclopaedia from 1895 to 1995. Wilby, Norfolk, UK: Michael Russell. p. 303-304. ISBN 9780859551786. OCLC 37491135.
