= Jonathan Harris =

American character actor (1914–2002)

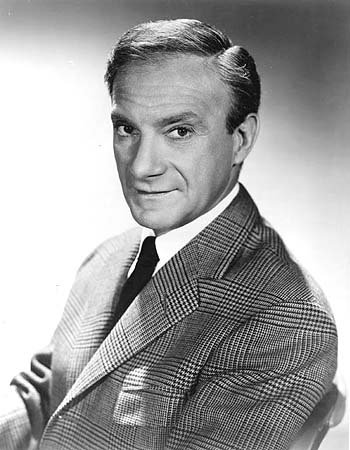
- Harris, c. 1967
- Born: Jonathan Daniel Charasuchin; November 6, 1914; New York City, New York, U.S.
- Died: November 3, 2002 (aged 87); Encino, California, U.S.
- Resting place: Pierce Brothers Westwood Village Memorial Park and Mortuary
- Education: Fordham University
- Occupation: Actor
- Years active: 1938–2002
- Spouse: Gertrude Bregman (m. 1938)
- Children: 1

Jonathan Daniel Harris (né Charasuchin; November 6, 1914 – November 3, 2002) was an American character actor whose career included more than 500 television and film appearances, as well as voiceovers. Two of his best-known roles were as the prudent accountant Bradford Webster in the television version of The Third Man and the fussy villain Dr. Zachary Smith of the 1960s science-fiction series Lost in Space. Near the end of his career, he provided voices for the animated features A Bug's Life and Toy Story 2.

== Biography ==
The second of three children, Harris was born on November 6, 1914, in the Bronx, New York City, to Russian Jewish immigrants Jennie (née Buchowitsky) and Sam Charasuchin. His father worked in Manhattan's Garment District. The family lived in a six-story tenement, and his mother often took in boarders to make ends meet, giving them Jonathan's room and bed and relegating him to sleep on the dining room chairs. By age 12, he was working in a pharmacy as a stockboy.

While there was little money for luxuries, Jonathan's father made an effort to expand his son's cultural horizons with occasional trips to see Yiddish theatre and by listening to opera on the dining room radio. Young Jonathan was enthralled. Although he could seldom afford tickets to them, Broadway plays were also an early interest. He detested his Bronx accent, and by high school, had cultivated an English one in its place by watching British B-movies at the arts theater. He also developed interests in archaeology, Latin, romantic poetry and Shakespeare.

Jonathan legally changed his name from Charasuchin to Harris before entering college after a year-long standoff with his father, who disagreed with the change.

=== Pharmacology career ===
Harris earned a degree in pharmacology from Fordham University, from which he graduated in 1936.

=== Marriage ===
Harris was married to his high school sweetheart, Gertrude Bregman, for over sixty years, from 1938 until his death in 2002. They had one child.

=== Acting career ===
==== Stage ====
Acting was Harris's first love. In 1939, at age 24, he prepared a fake résumé and tried out for a repertory company at the Millpond Playhouse on Long Island. He was hired by the director, Richard Brooks, to appear in a series of 26 plays the company performed in the summer of 1940.

In 1942, Harris won the leading role of a Polish officer in the Broadway play The Heart of a City, adopting a Polish accent. In 1946, he starred in A Flag Is Born, opposite Quentin Reynolds and Marlon Brando.

==== Early television career ====
Harris was a popular character actor for 30 years on television, making his first guest appearance on the episode "His Name Is Jason" on The Chevrolet Tele-Theatre in 1949. The role led to other roles in such series as The Web, Lights Out, Goodyear Television Playhouse, two episodes of Hallmark Hall of Fame, Armstrong Circle Theatre, three episodes of Studio One, Telephone Time, Schlitz Playhouse of Stars, Climax!, Outlaws, The Twilight Zone, Bonanza, The Rogues, The Adventures of Ozzie and Harriet, and Zorro, among many others. He was in the film Botany Bay (1953).

Harris landed a co-starring role opposite Michael Rennie in The Third Man, from 1959 to 1965. He played Bradford Webster, an eccentric, cowardly assistant. Half of the episodes were shot in London, England; the rest were filmed in Hollywood.

Harris appeared in two 1961 episodes of The Twilight Zone, including a heroic role in "The Silence", in which he ended up defending a young man challenged to be silent for a whole year at a prestigious gentleman's club and "Twenty Two", in which he played the doctor of a woman with a recurring nightmare. Harris also portrayed Charles Dickens in a 1963 episode of Bonanza.

From 1963 to 1965, Harris co-starred in the sitcom The Bill Dana Show. He played Mr. Phillips, the pompous manager of a posh hotel who is constantly at odds with his bumbling Bolivian bellhop, the Bill Dana character José Jiménez. Don Adams rounded out the cast as an inept house detective, a character whose distinctive mannerisms and catchphrases would soon carry over into his Maxwell Smart role on Get Smart. In similar fashion, several of Harris's catchphrases from the series, such as "Oh, the pain!", along with the character's mannerisms and delivery, became part of the Dr. Zachary Smith character on Lost in Space.

Harris played a similarly pompous diplomat on Get Smart in 1970. His female assistant was named Zachary. Harris also guest-starred on The Ghost & Mrs. Muir.

==== Dr. Zachary Smith in Lost in Space ====
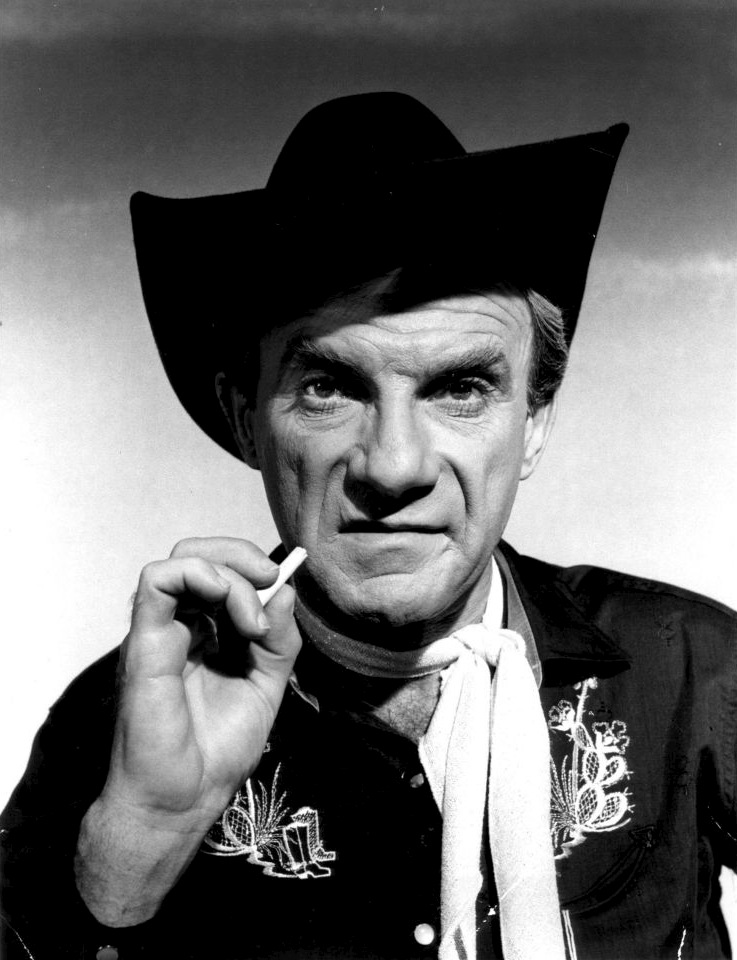
Harris as "Zeno" in the Lost in Space episode "West of Mars" (1966).

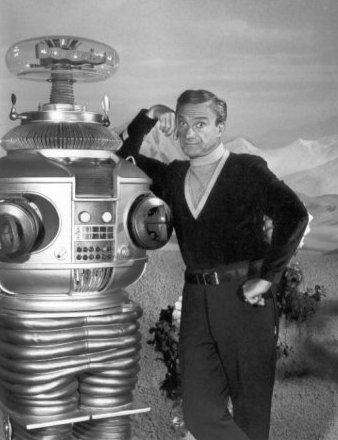
Harris as Doctor Smith (1967).

Harris was cast over two other actors for the role of Dr. Zachary Smith, the evil and conniving enemy agent on Lost in Space. The character did not appear in the original 1965 pilot episode for CBS, nor did The Robot. The series was already in production when Harris joined the cast, and starring/co-starring billing had already been contractually assigned. Harris successfully negotiated to receive "Special Guest Star" billing on every episode.

Bill Mumy said of Harris' role in his first episode:

"It was actually implied that this villainous character that sabotaged the mission and ended up with us was going to be killed off after a while. Jonathan played him as written, which was this really dark, straight-ahead villain."

The series was successful upon its debut and, midway through the first season, Harris began to rewrite his own dialogue to add more comedy, because he felt that his strength was in portraying a comic villain. Due to Harris's popularity on the show, Irwin Allen approved his changes and gave him carte blanche as a writer. Harris subsequently stole the show, mainly via a seemingly never-ending series of alliterative insults directed toward The Robot, which soon worked their way into popular culture. Dr. Smith's best-known tropes included spitefully calling The Robot epithets such as "bubble-headed booby" and "clamoring clod".

According to Bill Mumy, Harris moved quickly to develop the character:

"And we'd start working on a scene together, and he'd have a line, and then in the script I'd have my reply, and he'd say, 'No, no, no, dear boy. No, no, no. Before you say that, The Robot will say this, this, this, this, this, this, and this, and then, you'll deliver your line.' He truly, truly single-handedly created the character of Dr. Zachary Smith that we know — this man we love to hate, coward who would cower behind the little boy, 'Oh, the pain! Save me, William!' That's all him!"

When the series was renewed for its third and final season, it remained focused on Harris' character, Dr. Smith. While the series was still solidly placed in the middle of the ratings pack, the network wished to cut the budget. Irwin Allen refused, and the show was unexpectedly canceled in 1968 after 83 episodes, despite protests from its fans.

==== Later career ====
In the mid-1970s, Harris starred in live-action roles in two Saturday morning children's series, Space Academy and Uncle Croc's Block, and was a well-known TV spokesman for the International House of Pancakes (IHOP). He made several cameo and guest appearances during this period, including episodes of Bewitched and Sanford and Son.

In a 1971 episode of Night Gallery, titled "Since Aunt Ada Came to Stay", Harris played Professor Nicholas Porteus, an expert on witchcraft.

His last series guest-starring role was on an episode of Fantasy Island. He also starred as the character Fagan in the first episode of the science fiction series Ark II.

Harris taught drama, and was Chuck Norris's vocal coach for many years. Norris credited Harris for teaching him "how to speak" by sticking his fingers in Norris's mouth, adding that Harris was the only person in the world he would allow to do that.

==== Typecasting as a villain ====
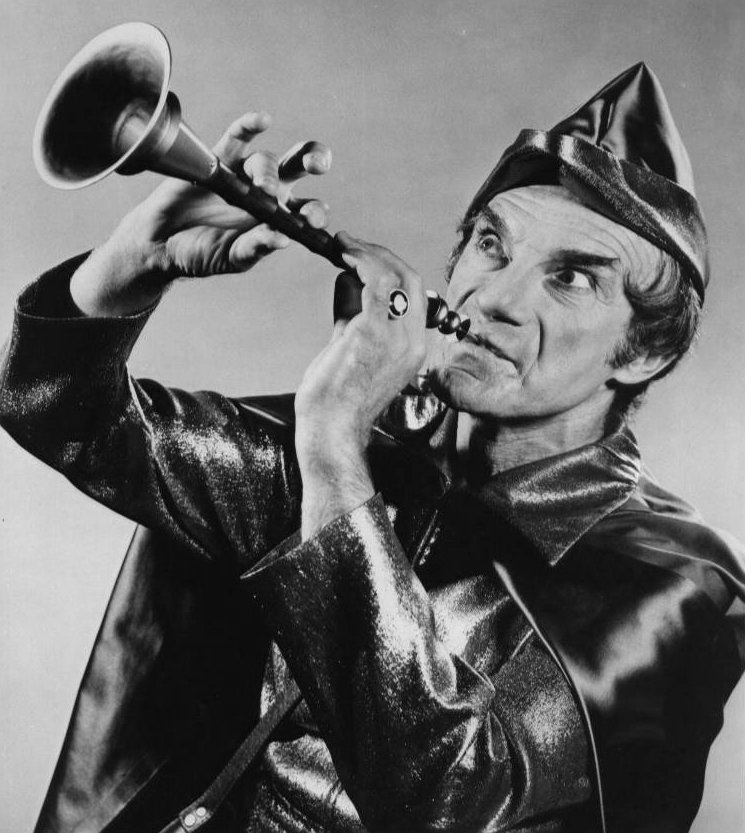
Harris as Mr. Piper in the Land of the Giants episode "Pay the Piper" (1970).

Although he was considered something of a cult icon for the role of Dr. Smith, Harris became typecast as a fey and sometimes campy villain. For example, Irwin Allen cast Harris as a villainous "Pied Piper" in an episode of Land of the Giants. Approached by Allen a second time, to star in a children's series, Jumbalina and the Teeners, Harris turned it down.

In 1970, Harris played the role of another not-so-likeable villain, the Bulmanian Ambassador in the Get Smart episode "How Green Was My Valet". Harris was also a co-star, alongside Charles Nelson Reilly, in the series Uncle Croc's Block, in which Harris and Reilly portrayed malcontents producing a children's television show. Harris played the director and Reilly the titular host, Uncle Croc. In the cartoon Visionaries: Knights of the Magical Light (1987), he played lackey and sycophant Mortdred to the main villain Darkstorm.

Harris also provided the voice of the Cylon character Lucifer, an antagonist on the original ABC version of Battlestar Galactica (1978).

==== Voice roles ====
Harris spent much of his later career working as a voice actor, and during it he was heard on television commercials as well as on cartoons such as Channel Umptee-3, The Banana Splits, My Favorite Martians, Rainbow Brite, Darkwing Duck, Happily Ever After, Problem Child, Spider-Man, A Bug's Life, Buzz Lightyear of Star Command, Toy Story 2, and Superman: The Animated Series. In the second season of Freakazoid!, Harris voiced Professor Jones, who is Freakazoid's butler and serves as a parody of Zachary Smith from Lost in Space.

In 2001, a year prior to his death, he recorded voice work for the animated theatrical short The Bolt Who Screwed Christmas. The film, Harris's last work, was released posthumously in 2009.

==== Lost in Space reunion appearances ====
In 1990, Harris reunited with the cast of Lost in Space in a filmed celebration of the 25th anniversary of the series' debut, at an event attended by more than 30,000 fans. Harris made a number of other convention appearances with other cast members of Lost in Space, including a 1996 appearance at Walt Disney World.

On June 14, 1995, Harris and other cast members appeared in The Fantasy Worlds of Irwin Allen, a television tribute to Irwin Allen, the creator of Lost in Space, who had died in 1991.

Harris refused to make a cameo appearance in the 1990s re-imagined film version of Lost in Space (1998), unlike many of his co-stars in the original series. He announced: "I've never played a bit part in my life and I'm not going to start now!" However, he did make promotional appearances for the film:

- Harris reprised his role as Dr. Smith in the one-hour television special Lost in Space Forever, and Harris and the rest of the surviving television cast appeared on the inside cover of an issue of TV Guide.
- In April 1998, Harris appeared as a guest on the talk show Biography, on which Harris fondly reminisced about his Lost in Space days, admitting he would stay up nights thinking of new alliterative insults for The Robot ("bellicose bumpkin," "bubble-headed booby") because he enjoyed the interaction so much.
- For an appearance by Harris, talk show host Conan O'Brien brought one of his characters, Pimp-Bot 5000 (a "robot pimp"; half 1950s’ robot, half 1970s’ street pimp), onto the set, and Harris went into character as Dr. Smith and proceeded to insult Pimp-Bot. Shying away from his usual dry, sarcastic, and often self-deprecating style, Conan admitted to Harris that he had brought Pimp-Bot on just to see Harris insult him.

In late 2002, Harris and the rest of the surviving cast of the television series were preparing to film an NBC two-hour film titled Lost in Space: The Journey Home; however, the project was unable to proceed after Harris' death.

=== Death and posthumous tributes ===
After he had been in a hospital for a back injury, Harris died of a blood clot on November 3, 2002, three days before his 88th birthday.

As a tribute to Harris, writer/director John Wardlaw wrote an additional scene for the film The Bolt Who Screwed Christmas, which included Harris's final performance before his death. Wardlaw asked Lost in Space co-stars Bill Mumy, Angela Cartwright, and Marta Kristen to contribute their voices to the film. Wardlaw described how the three actors reunited in the recording studio on June 14, 2006:

"This was the first time they had all been together in something unrelated to Lost in Space and it was a blast. They listened to what Harris had recorded and there were laughs and some tears."

Nearly five years later, Harris' wife died of natural causes, at age 93, on August 28, 2007.

== Filmography ==
=== Film ===
| Year | Title | Role | Notes |
|---|---|---|---|
| 1952 | Botany Bay | Tom Oakley | |
| 1959 | Catch Me If You Can | Lindström | Rediscovered in 2026 |
| 1959 | The Big Fisherman | Lysias | |
| 1985 | Rainbow Brite and the Star Stealer | Count Blogg (voice) | |
| 1987 | Pinocchio and the Emperor of the Night | Grumblebee (voice) | |
| 1989 | Happily Ever After | Sunflower (voice) | |
| 1998 | The 4th of July Parade | Grandpa Steve | |
| 1998 | A Bug's Life | Manny (voice) | |
| 1999 | Toy Story 2 | The Cleaner (voice) | |
| 2001 | Hubert's Brain | The Professor (voice) | Short |
| 2009 | The Bolt Who Screwed Christmas | The Bolt / Narrator (voice) | Short; Posthumous release, final film role |

=== Television ===
| Year | Title | Role | Notes |
|---|---|---|---|
| 1949 | The Chevrolet Tele-Theatre | | Episode: "His Name Is Jason" |
| 1958 | Colgate Theatre | Felix | Episode: "McCreedy's Woman" |
| 1959–1965 | The Third Man | Bradford Webster | 72 episodes |
| 1959 | Zorro | Don Carlos | 3 episodes |
| 1961 | Outlaws | Sam Twyfford | Episode: "Outrage at Pawnee Band" |
| 1961 | The Twilight Zone | The Doctor, George Alfred | 2 episodes |
| 1963 | The Lloyd Bridges Show | Walter W. Pike | Episode: "The Tyrees of Capitol Hill" |
| 1963–1965 | The Bill Dana Show | Mr. Phillips, Mr. Harris, King Edward | 40 episodes |
| 1963 | Bonanza | Charles Dickens | Episode: "A Passion for Justice" |
| 1968 | Bewitched | Johann Sebastian Monroe | Episode: "Samantha on the Keyboard" |
| 1968 | Bewitched | Sir Leslie | Episode: “Paul Revere Rides Again” |
| 1965–1968 | Lost in Space | Zachary Smith | 83 episodes |
| 1969 | Lancer | Padraic McGloin | Episode: "The Black McGloins" |
| 1970 | Land of the Giants | The Piper | Episode: "Pay the Piper" |
| 1970 | Get Smart | The Ambassador | Episode: "How Green Was My Valet" |
| 1973 | Sanford and Son | Emile Bodet | Episode: "Pot Luck" |
| 1975–1976 | Uncle Croc's Block | Basil Bitterbottom | |
| 1976 | Ark II | Fagon | Episode: "The Flies" |
| 1976 | Monster Squad | The Astrologer | Episode: "The Astrologer" |
| 1977 | Space Academy | Commander Isaac Gampu | 15 episodes |
| 1978–1979 | Battlestar Galactica | Lucifer (voice) | 9 episodes (uncredited) |
| 1984 | Diff'rent Strokes | Frankenstein's Creature (voice) | Episode: "Hooray for Hollywood" (uncredited) |
| 1985 | Challenge of the GoBots | Professor Janus (voice) | Episode: "Terror in Atlantis" |
| 1986 | Rainbow Brite | Count Blogg (voice) | 3 episodes |
| 1986–1987 | Foofur | Lance Lyons (voice) | 26 episodes |
| 1987 | Visionaries: Knights of the Magical Light | Mortdredd, Wizasquizar, Dark Bishop (voice) | 13 episodes |
| 1988 | BraveStarr | Professor Moriarty (voice) | Episode: "Sherlock Holmes in the 23rd Century" |
| 1989–1990 | Paddington Bear | Additional voices | 2 episodes |
| 1991 | Darkwing Duck | Phineas Sharp (voice) | Episode: "In Like Blunt" |
| 1996 | The Spooktacular New Adventures of Casper | Omar (voice) | Episode: "Poil Jammed/The Who That I Am/A Picture Says a Thousand Words" |
| 1996 | Mighty Ducks | Lord Gargan (voice) | Episode: "The Final Face Off" |
| 1996–1997 | Freakazoid! | Professor Jones (voice) | 6 episodes |
| 1996 | The Mask | The Devil (voice) | 2 episodes |
| 1996 | Quack Pack | Professor Henry Villanova (voice) | Episode: "Transmission Impossible" |
| 1997 | Superman: The Animated Series | Julian Frey (voice) | Episode: "Target" |
| 1997 | Extreme Ghostbusters | The Salesman (voice) | Episode: "Be Careful What You Wish For" |
| 1997 | Spider-Man: The Animated Series | Miles Warren (voice) | Episode: "The Return of Hydro-Man" |
| 1997 | Waynehead | Mr. Hollandopolis (voice) | Episode: "To Be Cool or Not to Be" |
| 1997 | Channel Umptee-3 | Stickley Rickets (voice) | 13 episodes |
| 1997 | The Angry Beavers | Julius Caesar (voice) | Episode: "Friends, Romans, Beavers!" |
| 1999 | The New Woody Woodpecker Show | Maxie the Polar Bear (voice) | Episode: "Chilly to Go" |
| 2000 | Buzz Lightyear of Star Command | Era (voice) | 2 episodes |
| 2006 | Danger Rangers | S.A.V.O. (voice) | Episode: "Mission 547: Safety Rules"; posthumous release |

=== Video games ===
| Year | Title | Role | Notes |
|---|---|---|---|
| 1998 | A Bug's Life | Manny | Voice |
