= This Ascension =

- Origin: Santa Barbara, California
- Genres: Alternative rock; gothic rock; dark wave; ethereal wave; dream pop
- Years active: 1988–2002, 2004
- Labels: Tess Records; Projekt Records
- Members: Dru Allen; Kevin Serra; Tim Tuttle; Matt Ballesteros; Cynthia Coulter; Paul Sutherland
- Past members: Terry Holgate; Charlie Dennis
- Website: www.thisascension.com

This Ascension is a gothic/ethereal band from Santa Barbara, Southern California that formed in 1988. They released four albums and two 7" vinyl singles on their label Tess Records, between 1989 and 1999. They also released a best of compilation: "Deeper and Further Away" on Projekt Records in 2014.

This Ascension toured coast to coast in the United States in 1994, 1995, and 1997. The band also toured the west coast prolifically, sharing the stage with bands including Clan of Xymox, The Jesus and Mary Chain, Chris Isaak, The Wolfgang Press, Pixies and The Stranglers.

After Tess Records folded in 2001, the band signed with Projekt Records. Their back catalogue was re-released, though the band became inactive soon afterwards. The group re-united with bassist Cynthia Coulter for several shows in 2004 and announced plans to write and record new material in 2013. The band also performed a reunion show in October, 2015 in Houston, Texas.

Vocalist Dru Allen (Dru) (b. 11 November 1969) has sung for the neo-classical project Mirabilis and the ambient/electronic act Falling You. Dru and Cynthia Coulter have gone on to join Erick R. Scheid in the ethereal goth/shoegazing band Mercury's Antennae.

Bassist Cynthia Coulter (Cindy) (b. 22 February 1971), younger sister of William Faith (William Coulter), went on to become the touring bassist for Faith & the Muse from 1999 - 2007. She later relocated from Van Nuys, CA to Portland, OR and became the bassist for the Portland-based band 'Pitchfork Motorway'.

Founding guitarist Kevin Serra (b. 4 July 1971), studied music theory in New York, and ran the music review site Kevchino. Serra records music for a singles project with guest vocalists under the name Cloud Seeding. The first single "Ink Jar/Unquestioning" features Boston's Marissa Nadler, which was followed by a second single "The Light."

Former bassist Charlie Dennis re-joined his previous band Nerf Herder.

This Ascension's cover of the song "Carol Of The Bells" was featured on ABC TV show Brothers & Sisters during the episode "Cold Turkey" which aired on December 12, 2010.

== Discography ==
=== Albums ===
- Tears in Rain (LP/CD) - Tess Records - 1989
- Light and Shade (CD) - Tess Records - 1991
- Walk Softly, A Dream Lies Here (CD) - Tess Records - 1994
- Sever (CD) - Tess Records - 1999
- Deeper and Further Away (Digital) - Projekt: Archive - 2014

=== Singles ===
- Isabella (7" single) - Tess Records - 1989
- Spirit of Christmas Past (7" single) - Tess Records - 1997
