= Mirabilis (band) =

- Origin: United States
- Years active: 2001–present
- Labels: Middle Pillar Presents; Projekt Records
- Members: Dru Allen; Summer Bowman
- Website: http://www.mirabilismusic.com/

Mirabilis is an American neoclassical dark wave musical project formed in 2001 by Dru Allen of This Ascension and Summer Bowman of the Machine in the Garden. Mirabilis uses vocals as the primary instrumentation, crafting original musical compositions and interpreting traditional classical vocal pieces from a number of different periods. The music is melodic and borrows from classical, ethereal, darkwave, and gothic genres. The name Mirabilis is Latin for something that is wonderful, miraculous, or unusual.

In December 2003, the band's first release, a limited edition 7-inch self-titled EP was released on Fossil Dungeon. They quickly followed up with a full-length debut CD in 2004 on the Middle Pillar Presents label. The album Pleiades is named for a mysterious star cluster which in Greek mythology told the fates of seven sisters.

Dru and Summer are the core members of Mirabilis, but they use the project as an avenue to bring in other like-minded artists as guest performers and the album features Dru and Summer as well as guest vocalists Regeana Morris (of The Changelings), Katy Belle (of Matson Belle), Sleepthief and Rebecca Colleen Miller.

In 2007, Projekt Records and Middle Pillar Presents jointly released the band's second full-length release, Sub Rosa.

== Members ==
- Dru Allen
- Summer Bowman

== Discography ==
- Mirabilis 7-inch EP Fossil Dungeon ©2003
- Pleiades Middle Pillar Presents ©2004
- Sub Rosa Projekt Records/Middle Pillar Presents ©2007
- Here and the Hereafter Projekt Records ©2014
- Pieces (by artist Anti-M) Summer and Dru make a guest appearance on the song "Nighttime Birds (The Gathering Cover)" on the Anti-M album, Pieces. ©2019
