= Angela Cartwright =

British actress (born 1952)

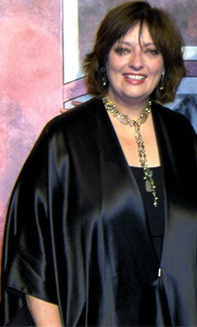
- Cartwright in November 2005
- Born: Angela Margaret Cartwright; 9 September 1952 (age 74); Altrincham, Cheshire, England
- Occupations: Actress; photographer
- Years active: 1956–present
- Known for: The Sound of Music; Lost in Space
- Spouse: Steve Gullion (m. 1976)
- Children: 2
- Relatives: Veronica Cartwright (sister)
- Website: angela-cartwright.com

Angela Margaret Cartwright (born 9 September 1952) is an English actress. As a young performer, she played Linda Williams, the stepdaughter of Danny Williams (played by Danny Thomas) in the long-running TV series The Danny Thomas Show, and Penny Robinson in the 1960s television series Lost in Space. She is also known for her role as Brigitta von Trapp in the 1965 film The Sound of Music. Her older sister is actress Veronica Cartwright.

== Early life and career ==
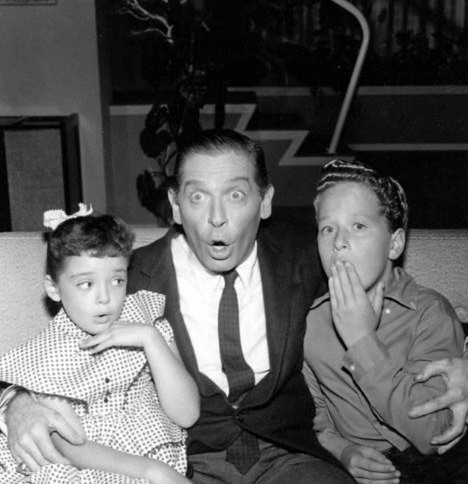
L–R: Cartwright, Milton Berle and Rusty Hamer on Make Room for Daddy

Angela Cartwright was born on 9 September 1952, in Altrincham, Cheshire, England. When she was a year old, her family moved to the US via Canada. Cartwright made her first film appearance at age three as Paul Newman's character's daughter in Somebody Up There Likes Me (1956), and appeared with Rock Hudson and Sidney Poitier in Something of Value (1957). Cartwright appeared for seven seasons in the CBS TV series The Danny Thomas Show, opposite comedian Danny Thomas. She remained close to Thomas after the series' cancellation until his death on 6 February 1991.

Cartwright played the role of Brigitta von Trapp in The Sound of Music (1965). The film won five Academy Awards and eclipsed Gone with the Wind as the highest-grossing film of all-time.

Cartwright played Penny Robinson in the TV series Lost in Space (1965–68). She made appearances on several TV shows, including My Three Sons, Adam-12 and The Love Boat. Cartwright was also cast in the television movie Scout's Honor (1980) and played the role of Miss D'Angelo in High School U.S.A. (1983).

Cartwright played Theresa Mazzetti in Beyond the Poseidon Adventure (1979), directed by Lost in Space producer Irwin Allen. She has had cameo appearances in the 1998 Lost in Space film and also as Dr. Smith's mother in the third episode of the second season of the 2018 Netflix reimagined Lost in Space series.

== Personal life ==
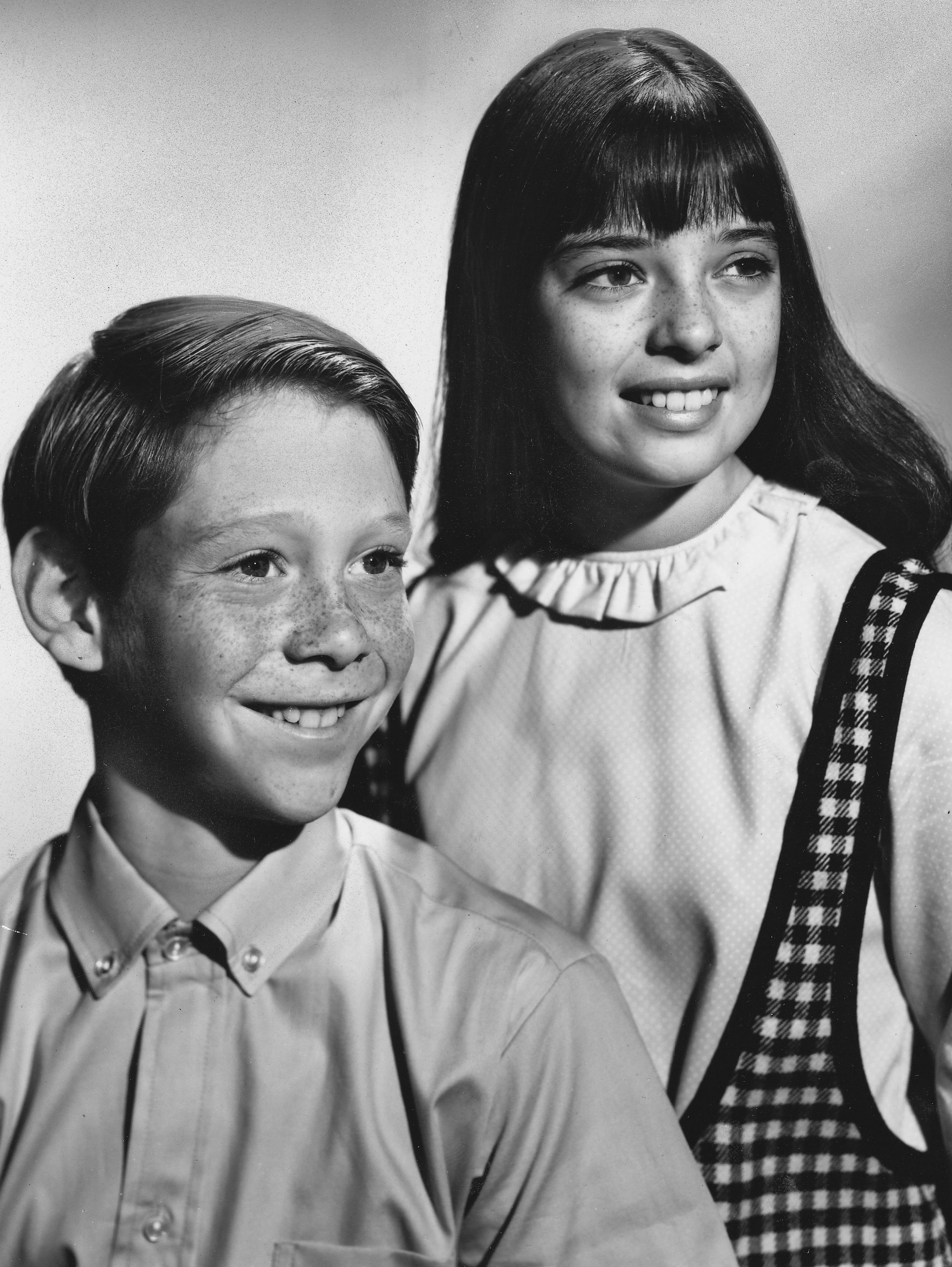
Billy Mumy and Cartwright in Lost in Space (1965)

After Lost in Space ended, co-star Bill Mumy wanted to continue private tutoring on the set with Cartwright because he had a crush on her. Although she was two years older than him, they later began dating.

Cartwright married Steve Gullion in 1976. They have two children.

Cartwright has been a photographer for 30 years. Her work is displayed at her studio in Studio City, Los Angeles.

Cartwright is a Catholic and has attended Mass at St. Charles Borromeo along with her sister Veronica.

== Filmography ==
=== Film ===
Year	Title	Role	Notes
1956	Somebody Up There Likes Me	Audrey at age 3	Uncredited
1957	Something of Value	Caroline	Uncredited
1962	Lad, A Dog	Angela	
1965	The Sound of Music	Brigitta von Trapp	
1975	Mr. & Ms. and the Magic Studio Mystery	Sally	TV film
1979	Beyond the Poseidon Adventure	Theresa Mazzetti	
1980	Scout's Honor	Alfredo's Mom	TV film
1983	High School U.S.A.	Miss D'Angelo	TV film
1998	Lost in Space	Reporter No. 2	
2010	Elf Sparkle and the Special Red Dress	Miss Cow	Voice

=== Television ===
Year	Title	Role	Notes
1957–1964	The Danny Thomas Show	Linda Williams	Series regular
1958	The Lucy-Desi Comedy Hour	Linda Williams	Episode: "Lucy Makes Room for Danny"
1958	Whirlybirds	Susan Davis	Episode: "Glamour Girl"
1960	Shirley Temple's Storybook	Jane	Episode: "Babes in Toyland"
1960	Alfred Hitchcock Presents	Irenee Wellington	Season 5 Episode 35: "The Schartz-Metterklume Method" (uncredited)
1961	The Red Skelton Hour	Girl	1 episode. uncredited
1965	The John Forsythe Show		Episode: "Little Miss Egghead"
1965	My Three Sons	Alice Vail	Episode: "The Glass Sneaker"
1965–1968	Lost in Space	Penny Robinson	Series regular
1969	My Three Sons	Debbie Hunter	Episode: "Chip and Debbie"
1969	Calling Dr. Gannon	Angela	Episode: "Operation Heartbeat"
1970–1971	Make Room for Granddaddy	Linda Williams	Series regular
1971	Adam-12	Cindy Williams	Episode: "Assassination"
1972	Room 222	Phyllis Nichols	2 episodes
1977	Logan's Run	Karen	Episode: "The Collectors"
1982	The Love Boat	Yanne	Episode: "Baby Talk/My Friend, the Executrix/Programmed for Love"
1985	Airwolf	Mrs. Cranovich	Episode: "Eruption"
2018	Lost in Space	Sheila Harris	Episode: "Echoes"

== Books and publications ==
Pasticcio quartz is a bi-annual journal written and published by Sarah Fishburn and Angela Cartwright. Issue Number 1 was 52, full-color glossy 8.5 by 8.5-inch, pages and was published on July 23, 2007. The most current, 60-page issue (Number 15: January 10, 2014), retains the size and full-color attributes.

- In This House: A Collection of Altered Art Imagery and Collage Techniques (2007)
- Mixed Emulsions: Altered Art Techniques for Photographic Imagery (2007)
- In This Garden: Exploration in Mixed-Media Visual Narrative (2009)
- "Lineage: A Personal & Private Journey", Somerset Studio magazine (Mar/Apr 2014)
- Styling the Stars: Lost Treasures from the Twentieth Century Fox Archive (2014), Angela Cartwright and Tom McLaren, foreword by Maureen O'Hara
  - Styling the Stars, IBPA 2015 Benjamin Franklin Awards, Gold Winner, Cover Design: Large Format
- Styling the Stars: Lost Treasures from the Twentieth Century Fox Archive (Softcover 2017), Angela Cartwright and Tom McLaren, foreword by Maureen O'Hara
- On Purpose: A Novel by Angela Cartwright and Bill Mumy (2018)
- Lost (and Found) in Space 2: Blast Off into the Expanded Edition by Angela Cartwright and Bill Mumy (2021)
