= Desert Solitaire (album) =

Studio album by Steve Roach, Kevin Braheny and Michael Stearns
- Released: 1989
- Studio: The Timeroom, Crystal Sound and M'Ocean Studios in Los Angeles, California
- Genre: Ambient
- Length: 65:12
- Label: Fortuna
- Producer: Steve Roach, Kevin Braheny, Michael Stearns, and Ethan Edgecombe

Steve Roach chronology
| Stormwarning (1989) | Desert Solitaire (1989) | Strata (1990) |

Kevin Braheny chronology
| Galaxies (1988) | Desert Solitaire (1989) | Secret Rooms (1990) |

Michael Stearns chronology
| Encounter (1988) | Desert Solitaire (1989) | Baraka (1993) |

Professional ratings
Review scores
| Source | Rating |
|---|---|
| Allmusic | 3/5 stars |
| Linda Kohanov | favorable |

Desert Solitaire is a collaborative album by American ambient musicians Steve Roach, Kevin Braheny, and Michael Stearns. This album was conceived as a follow-up to Roach and Braheny's 1987 collaboration Western Spaces.

The title of the album is named after the eponymous book by U.S. author Edward Abbey, who died the same year and to whom the album is dedicated.

== Track listing ==
1. "Flatlands" (Roach) (4:49)
2. "Labyrinth" (Sterns) (6:56)
3. "Specter" (Roach) (9:34)
4. "The Canyon's Embrace" (Roach, Stearns) (3:35)
5. "Cloud of Promise" (Roach, Stearns) (6:38)
6. "Knowledge & Dust" (Braheny) (3:23)
7. "Shiprock" (Stearns) (4:00)
8. "Highnoon" (Roach, Stearns) (10:30)
9. "Empty Time" (Braheny) (5:51)
10. "From the Heart of Darkness" (Stearns) (3:50)
11. "Desert Solitaire" (Roach, Braheny) (6:06)

== Personnel ==
- Steve Roach (Oberheim OB-8, DMX, Matrix-12, Xpander, Emax, ARP 2600, Korg M-1, Kawai K-5, ocarina, Taos Drum)
- Kevin Braheny (The Mighty Serge, Prophet VS, Prophet 2002, soprano saxophone, tin whistle, Diamondback rattlesnake)
- Michael Stearns (Roland D-50, S-50, Yamaha TX-7, Oberheim OB-8, Serge Modular synthesizer, 12-string guitar)

with

- Chuck Oken, Jr. (shakers on “Flatlands”)
- Robert Rich (dumbek and gourd drums on “Specter”)
- Goergianne Cowan (voice on “Specter”)
- Miguel Rivera (effects and ghost percussion on “Labyrinth” and “From the Heart of Darkness”)
- Leonice Shinneman (percussion, pakhawaj, manjerra, African berimbau, melodic rattle, claves on “Empty Time”)
- Hyman Katz (flute on “From the Heart of Darkness”)
