= Omega (Epica album) =

2021 studio album by Epica

Studio album by Epica
- Released: 26 February 2021
- Recorded: January – May 2020
- Studios: Sandlane Recording Facilities (Rijen); Bader Studios (Weil der Stadt); Casterly Rock Studio (Serradifalco); Smecky Music Studios (Prague); Sint Antonius Kerk (Overlangel); Sandip Banerjee's Studio (Kolkata); Kevin Codfert's Studio (Saint-Rémy-de-Provence); PaulyB Studios (Tampa); The Grid (Montreal)
- Genre: Symphonic metal
- Length: 70:16
- Label: Nuclear Blast
- Producers: Joost van den Broek; Epica

Epica chronology
Epica vs Attack on Titan Songs (2017)	Omega (2021)	The Alchemy Project (2022)

Singles from Omega
- 1. "Abyss of Time – Countdown to Singularity" Released: 9 October 2020; 2. "Freedom – The Wolves Within" Released: 27 November 2020; 3. "Rivers" Released: 22 January 2021; 4. "The Skeleton Key" Released: 26 February 2021

Omega (stylized as Ωmega) is the eighth studio album by Dutch symphonic metal band Epica. It was released on 26 February 2021 via Nuclear Blast.

== Production ==
Simone Simons had stated on 1 February 2020 that pre-production for the next album had been completed. On 11 March 2020, the band entered the studio to begin recording their album, while in turn released studio vlogs showing the album making process for the studio album.

Mark Jansen had said in an interview that the album's release date could be delayed as a result of the COVID-19 pandemic affecting the recording sessions. It was reported that on 17 April 2020 that Simone Simons had finished recording vocals for the new album. Mark Jansen later confirmed on September 2, 2020, that the album had been recorded, mixed and mastered with orchestrations and choir having been wrapped up before the band began recording.

On 6 January 2021, it was confirmed that Vicky Psarakis and Zaher Zorgati would provide guest vocals on the album, for the songs "Twilight Reverie – The Hypnagogic State" and "Code of Life".

In the fourteenth vlog documenting the production of the album which was released on the band's YouTube channel on 9 February 2021, Jansen discussed the concept of the album itself: "We as humanity, we were drifting apart like competition, you see that in the corporations' competition. And while we in fact, flourish while we are working together." Regarding the album title, he stated additionally: "There was the Omega Point theory that comes to the surface in the lyrics and the Omega Point theory, is dealing about the scientific speculation and spiritual view that we are, fated to spiral towards one point of divine unification."

== Composition ==
=== Influences, style and themes ===
When asked about the theme behind the seventh track "Freedom – The Wolves Within", Jansen stated that the song is "based on an old story of a fight between two wolves. What we want to be and what we want to reflect on the world around us depends on which wolf we feed and also the degree of control we have over our inner wolves."

According to Jansen, "Kingdom of Heaven, Part III – The Antediluvian Universe" is the final part of the "Kingdom of Heaven" series. He stated: "This is the third and final 'Kingdom of Heaven' song. It's our eighth studio album. The number eight is also very spiritual because if you put it on the side, it's the infinity symbol. 'Kingdom of Heaven' is about life after death, and it's also number eight on the album. So there is a lot of hidden symbolism on the album and in the artwork. The big life question, 'What is the true meaning of life?' How do we navigate through life within ourselves? We are all 'yin and yang.' We are all made out of light and dark. We all have this labyrinth within ourselves in which we have to navigate ourselves. We hopefully find our way out of the labyrinth and don't get lost within the labyrinth of ourselves."

According to Simons, the ninth track "Rivers" symbolizes the calmness and at the same time the uncertainty in life, the ebb and flow. She stated that the calm water represents peace, and a strong river stream means that you "have to face challenges and swim against the tide of life."

== Release and promotion ==
On 9 October 2020, the first single off of the album, "Abyss of Time – Countdown to Singularity", was released with an official videoclip. The second single off of the album, "Freedom – The Wolves Within", was released on 27 November 2020 along with a music video. Both singles had amassed over three million streams online since their release. A music video for the acoustic version of "Abyss o' Time" was released on 18 December 2020. The third single, "Rivers", was released on 22 January 2021 along with a visualizer video. A music video for "Omegacoustic", an acoustic version of "Omega – Sovereign of the Sun Spheres" was released on 15 February 2021. Another videoclip, for "The Skeleton Key", was released on the same day as the album.

On 29 April 2021, the band announced that they would be performing a livestream event titled Omega Alive in support of the album which took place on 12 June 2021. The livestream event featured the biggest production with visual surprises as well as songs from the album.

== Critical reception ==
Professional ratings
Review scores
Source	Rating
Distorted Sound	8/10
Folk N' Rock	5/5 stars
Kerrang!	4/5 stars
Metal Hammer	3.5/5 stars
Sonic Perspectives	9.2/10

The album received generally positive reviews from music critics upon the album's release.

Distorted Sound scored the album 8 out of 10 and said: "Where previous albums The Quantum Enigma and The Holographic Principle often delved into scientific principles, Omega opts to take a personal, individual approach to these themes. Drawing heavily on the Emerald Tablets of Thoth the Atlantean, a 20th-century work by occultist Maurice Doreal, and on individual experiences, the band weave these concepts and their music together into what can only accurately be described as epic. This level of scale and ambition is nothing new for Epica but after five years without new music and emerging into a world changed beyond all recognition since they last recorded, Omega stands as both a fitting conclusion to the trilogy that started with The Quantum Engima and as the bold start of a brand new era."

Kerrang! gave the album 4 out of 5 with writer Steve Beebee stating: "Omega proves that as bombastic as symphonic metal gets, it's no different to any other genre in that, ultimately, it's all about the songs. And these songs are Epica's best."

Metal Hammer gave the album a positive review and stated: "Never ones to disappoint, Epica once again reach their epic quotient on Omega without choking, perhaps proving that too much of a good thing is a good thing."

== Track listing ==
Omega track listing
No.	Title	Lyrics	Music	Length
1.	"Alpha – Anteludium"	Mark Jansen	Mark Jansen, Epica	1:38
2.	"Abyss of Time – Countdown to Singularity"	Jansen	Jansen, Epica	5:20
3.	"The Skeleton Key"	Simone Simons	Rob van der Loo, Epica	5:06
4.	"Seal of Solomon"	Jansen	Jansen, Epica	5:28
5.	"Gaia"	Simons	Ariën van Weesenbeek, Epica	4:46
6.	"Code of Life"	Simons	Coen Janssen, Epica	5:58
7.	"Freedom – The Wolves Within"	Jansen	Jansen, Epica	5:37
8.	"Kingdom of Heaven, Part III – The Antediluvian Universe": I. "Ātman"; II. "Sri Yantra"; III. "Halls of Amenti"; IV. "Duality"; V. "The Chikhai Bardo – Navigating the Afterlife Realms"; VI. "The Flower of Life – The Cosmic Spiral"	Jansen	Isaac Delahaye, Mark Jansen, Epica	13:24
9.	"Rivers"	Simons	Van der Loo, Epica	4:48
10.	"Synergize – Manic Manifest"	Simons	Delahaye, Epica	6:56
11.	"Twilight Reverie – The Hypnagogic State"	Jansen	Jansen, Epica	4:29
12.	"Omega – Sovereign of the Sun Spheres": I. "The Omega Point"; II. "The Hounds of the Barrier"; III. "The Apocalypse of the Illuminated Soul"	Jansen	Delahaye, Epica	7:06
Total length:				70:16

Disc 2: Omegacoustic
No.	Title	Length
1.	"Rivers" (a capella)	4:34
2.	"Abyss O' Time"	4:13
3.	"Omegacoustic"	4:29
4.	"El Código Vital"	3:51
Total length:		17:07

=== Notes ===
- The earbook edition of the album includes a third disc (Opus Ωmega, containing the orchestral versions of disc one) and a fourth disc (Ωmega Instrumental, containing the instrumental versions of disc one).

== Personnel ==
Credits for Omega adapted from liner notes.

Epica

- Simone Simons – lead vocals, backing vocals
- Mark Jansen – grunts, rhythm guitar
- Isaac Delahaye – lead, rhythm and acoustic guitar, orchestral snare drum, orchestral toms
- Coen Janssen – synths, grand piano, glockenspiel, tubular bells, orchestral snare drum, orchestral toms, Gran casa, bongos, finger cymbals, tambourine, shaker, barchimes, choir arrangements, choir scoring, orchestral arrangements, additional samples and effects
- Rob van der Loo – bass
- Ariën van Weesenbeek – drums, additional grunts, orchestral snare drum, orchestral toms

Additional personnel

- Marcela Bovio – backing vocals
- Linda Janssen-van Summeren – backing vocals
- Zaher Zorgati – Arabic vocals and translations
- Paul Babikian – spoken words
- Vicky Psarakis – spoken words

Choir – Kamerkoor PA'dam

- Maria van Nieukerken – choir director
- Angus van Grevenbroek, Alfrun Schmidt, Annemarie Verburg, Annemieke Nuijten, Annette Vermeulen, Cecile Roovers, Frédérique Klooster, Guido Groenland, Henk Gunneman, Jan Douwes, Jan Hoffmann, Joost van Velzen, Karne Langnedonk, Martha Bosch, Martijn de Graaf Bierbrauwer, René Veen

Children's Choir – Zangschool BrabantTalent

- Gert Oude Sogtoen – choir director
- Floor-Anne van Vliet – vocal coach
- Alex Boegheim, Annejet Beuker, Anne Jacobs, Anne van Hoek, Anne Pepers, Babette Barnhoorn, Bas Stokkermans, Cato Janssen, Daan Karstens, Elin Rikken, Eline van den Hoven, Emma Masarovic, Eva van de Wettering, Fee Sannen, Femme Janssen, Femke Kempkes, Fieke van den Bogaart, Floris Bergen, Hazel Setton, Holly van Zoggel, Hugo Bergen, Ilse van Eek, India Mélotte, Janita Bekkering, Jasmijn Jeurissen, Jazz Fafié, Job Stokkermans, Jula van de Wijngaard, Julian van Neerven, Juniper Setton, Laura Kempkes, Laura van Kollenburg, Lieke van der Aa, Lotte Spohr, Luna Legel, Madeleine Dechesne, Manou Garnier, Marloes Woudsma, Miloe Verdoorn, Nina Megens, Nienke van Eek, Noor Saras, Pam Roelofs, Pleun Couwenhoven, Pleun Tibosch, Poppy Setton, Pepijn Janssen, Renee Meenderink, Renske Bakker, Roos Derks, Saar Muis, Saar van Uden, Sarah Florie, Sterre Mélotte, Suze van Haaren, Tess van de Beek, Veerke van Rooij, Victoria Karimov, Vincent van Duren, Zoë Loeffen

The City of Prague Philharmonic Orchestra

- Adam Klemens – orchestral conductor
- Marie Dvorská – violin
- Petr Pavlíček – violin
- Jana Hřebíková – violin
- Milan Lajčík – violin
- Miluše Kaudersová – violin
- Bohumil Kotmel – violin
- Petra Bohm – violin
- Karla Lobovská – violin
- Karel Vidimský – violin
- Miloš Černý – violin
- Iva Jaške Příhonská – violin
- Libor Kaňka – violin
- Miroslav Kosina – violin
- Anna Lundáková – violin
- Ondřejka Dlouhá – violin
- Igor Lecian – violin
- Jiři Sládek – violin
- Stanislav Rada – violin
- Lukáš Cach – viola
- Miroslav Novotný – viola
- Tomáš Kamarýt – viola
- Boris Goldstein – viola
- Jaromír Páviček – viola
- Milan Souček – viola
- Martin Adamovič – viola
- Marek Elznic – cello
- Pavel Běloušek – cello
- Ctibor Příhoda – cello
- Kryštof Lecian – cello
- Vojtěch Masnica – double bass
- Rostislav Dvrdík – double bass
- Tomáš Josífko – double bass
- Jiři Skuhra – flute
- Zdeněk Rys – oboe
- Aleš Hustoles – clarinet
- Luboš Hucek – bassoon
- Marek Zvolánek – trumpet
- Svatopluk Zaal – trumpet
- Martin Pavluš – trumpet
- Stanislav Penk – trombone
- Aleš Vopelka – trombone
- Tomáš Bialko – trombone
- František Pok – French horn
- Jiři Lisý – French horn
- Jan Mach – French horn
- Pavel Jirásek – French horn
- Luděk Hrabec – tuba

Additional orchestra

- Jeroen Goossens – flute, bass flute, piccolo, clarinet, ney, bansuri, low whistle, tin whistle
- Sandip Banerjee – sitar, santoor, sarod, bansuri, didgeridoo, tabla, pakhwaz, mridangam, ghatam, tavil, ganjira, dafli, gang
- Igor Hobus – orchestral snare drum, orchestral toms, gong, suspended symbal, cymbal a due, congas

Production

- Joost van den Broek – engineering, editing, mixing, vocal arrangements, arrangements, orchestral arrangements, congas, additional samples and effects
- Jos Driessen – engineering, editing
- Jens Kothe – engineering
- Jan Holzner – engineering
- Kevin Codfert – engineering
- Christian Donaldson – engineering
- Darius van Helfteren – mastering
- Stáňa Vomáčková – translator
- Josef Pokluda – contractor
- Jérôme Bailly – co-writer (tracks 1, 2, 11)
- Sascha Paeth – vocal arrangements
- Ben Mathot – orchestral scoring
- Adam Denlinger – English coach, lyrical advice
- Jaap Toorenaar – Latin translations
- Gjalt Lucassen – Latin translations
- Stefan Heilemann – art direction, design, photography
- Tim Tronckoe – photography
- Ferdinando Scavone – photography
- Ettore Maria Garozzo – photography
- Emir Medic – styling

== Charts ==
Chart performance for Omega
Chart (2021)	Peak position
Austrian Albums (Ö3 Austria)	15
Belgian Albums (Ultratop Flanders)	6
Belgian Albums (Ultratop Wallonia)	14
Dutch Albums (Album Top 100)	7
Finnish Albums (Suomen virallinen lista)	18
French Albums (SNEP)	49
German Albums (Offizielle Top 100)	4
Italian Albums (FIMI)	74
Japanese Albums (Billboard Japan)	90
Japanese Albums (Oricon)	113
Polish Albums (ZPAV)	11
Portuguese Albums (AFP)	21
Scottish Albums (Official Charts)	12
Swiss Albums (Schweizer Hitparade)	5
Spanish Albums (Promusicae)	22
UK Albums (Official Charts)	73
UK Independent Albums (Official Charts)	7
UK Rock & Metal Albums (Official Charts)	4
