= Sacred space (disambiguation) =

Sacred space may refer to:

- Sacred architecture or religious architecture
  - Hierotopy, the creation of sacred spaces
- Sacred space in Ganachakra or various tantric assemblies and feasts
- Sacred Space Music, the third album of Constance Demby
- Sacred Space (website), an Irish prayer website
- Sacred site a location which is deemed to be sacred or hallowed.
