= Dorothy Carter =

American musician

Dorothy Carter (born New York City, 1935, died June 7, 2003, in New Orleans) was an American musician. She performed contemporary, folk, traditional, medieval, and experimental music with a large collection of stringed instruments such as the hammered dulcimer, zither, psaltery, and hurdy-gurdy. Carter is regarded as an important figure in the genres of psychedelic folk music and medieval music revival.

== Biography ==
Carter studied classical piano at age six. She later attended Bard College in New York, the London Royal Academy, and Guildhall School of Music in London.

In the early 1970s, Carter was a member of the Central Maine Power Music Company with Robert Rutman and Constance Demby. She moved to Cambridge, Massachusetts, where she continued to collaborate with Rutman, who played his sound sculptures on her second album. She regularly played concerts with Rutman's Steel Cello Ensemble, a collaboration that persisted for decades.

In 1996, singer and founder of Miranda Sex Garden, Katharine Blake, and Carter formed Mediæval Bæbes, an all-female a cappella early music vocal group. The group's debut album, Salva Nos, reached number 2 on the UK Classical Charts.

Carter later settled in New Orleans, residing in a live-in studio on the third floor of a warehouse building where she hosted salons. She died in 2003 of an aneurysm. She is survived by a son and daughter, Justin Carter of Los Angeles, California, and Celeste Carter of Picayune, Mississippi, and a grandson, Damien Helgason.

== Appearances ==
- 2000, Vancouver, BC. Dorothy Carter played hurdy-gurdy at the Vancouver Folk Music Festival. A recording can be heard on the Soundscapes 2000 album.

== Discography ==
=== As Dorothy Carter ===
- Troubadour (1976)
- Waillee Waillee (1978)
- Lonesome Dove (2000)
- Dorothy Carter (2003)

=== With Mediæval Bæbes ===
- Salva Nos (1997)
- Worldes Blysse (1998)
- The Best of the Mediæval Bæbes (1999, a compilation of tracks from the first two albums)
- Undrentide (2000)
- The Rose (2002)
