= Thom Brennan =

- Born: May 31, 1957 (age 69); Lubbock, Texas, U.S.
- Origin: Los Angeles, California, U.S.
- Genres: Electronic, ambient, new-age
- Occupations: Composer, synthesist, producer
- Instrument: Synthesizers
- Years active: 1987 – present
- Labels: Rubicon, Phonogram Records, Amplexus / Arya, IC Records, Projekt, Space For Music, AtmoWorks, Fortuna / Celestial Harmonies, Raingarden SoundWorks
- Website: www.thombrennan.com

Thom Brennan (born May 31, 1957 in Lubbock, Texas) is an American electronic ambient musician, composer and synthesist. Active since the 1980s with his first album Mountains (1987), he belongs to the scene of Californian pioneers of electronic music. His style encloses the principal traits characterizing the evolution from Terry Riley's and Morton Subotnick's minimalism to the form of electronic new-age suite.

== Works ==
Thom Brennan's music is realized almost exclusively with synthesizers, with rare use of samples and without any acoustic instrument. His production consist mostly of beatless soundscapes; however, in a few works which he himself calls rhythmic journeys, Brennan employs percussive sounds and, more frequently, rhythmic synth patterns or timbral movements.

His first work, Mountains, was recorded on a 2 track stereo cassette deck in 1987; it was inspired by memories of Thom Brennan's childhood on an island in the East China Sea. This album was one of the most ambitious works of the so-called Los Angeles school; Steve Roach helped with the production.

His compositions are largely inspired by nature, especially by American Southwest landscapes and by Pacific Northwest forests. All this results in a neo-classical ambient impressionism distinguished by a strong visual approach, as shown in albums like Mist and others he has recorded, starting from 2001, after a move to Seattle.

In addition to his solo productions, Brennan appeared in collaboration with other well-known ambient composers such as Steve Roach and Kevin Braheny on Western Spaces (1987) and Vidna Obmana on Amplexus: Collected Works from the 1995 Ltd Series (1997). However, all of Thom Brennan's main works are self-productions, and since the beginning of his career he has chosen the World Wide Web as the primary channel of distribution. Today he continues working as an independent artist, publishing his releases through his own label, Raingarden SoundWorks.

== Discography ==
- 1987 - Mountains (Cassette), TMB Music.
- 1987 - Western Spaces (CD, LP, TP; with Steve Roach; track: In The Heat Of Venus), Innovative Communication/Fortuna.
- 1990 - Western Spaces (CD; with Steve Roach; tracks: "In the Heat of Venus" and "New Moon at Forbidden Mesa"), Fortuna Records.
- 1993 - Mountains (CD, Album), Rubicon.
- 1995 - The Path Not Taken (CD, Mini, Ltd), Amplexus.
- 1996 - Beneath Clouds (CD), Arya.
- 1996 - Amplexus: Collected Works from the 1995 Ltd Series (CD; with Steve Roach and Vidna Obmana), Projekt.
- 2000 - Mist (CDr), Space For Music.
- 2001 - Mist (CDr), Raingarden SoundWorks.
- 2001 - Secret Faiths Of Salamanders (CDr), Ampcastcom.
- 2001 - Shimmer (CD), TMB Music.
- 2001 - Shimmer (CDr), Ampcastcom.
- 2001 - Strange Paradise (CDr), Raingarden SoundWorks.
- 2001 - Vibrant Water (CDr), Ampcastcom.
- 2001 - Vibrant Water (CDr), Raingarden SoundWorks.
- 2002 - Satori (CDr), Zero Music (USA).
- 2002 - Collective Series Vol. 1 - Basic Space (CD; with other artists), Space For Music.
- 2002 - Schwingungen Radio Auf CD # 85 (CD; with other artists), Cue Records (Germany).
- 2003 - Signals In Moonlight (CDr), TMB Music.
- 2003 - Signals In Moonlight (CDr), TMB Music.
- 2004 - Beneath Clouds (CD), Raingarden SoundWorks.
- 2004 - Mist (CD), Raingarden SoundWorks.
- 2004 - Mist (CD), Space For Music.
- 2004 - Mountains (CD), Raingarden SoundWorks.
- 2004 - Satori (CD), TMB Music.
- 2004 - Shimmer (CD), TMB Music.
- 2004 - Signals In Moonlight (CD), Raingarden SoundWorks.
- 2004 - Strange Paradise (CD), TMB Music.
- 2004 - Vibrant Water (CD), TMB Music.
- 2005 - Satori (CD), Raingarden SoundWorks.
- 2005 - Silver (CD), Raingarden SoundWorks.
- 2005 - Vista (MP3 CD), SoundClickcom.
- 2005 - Vista II (MP3 CD), SoundClickcom.
- 2005 - Special CD Sampler E-dition #10 (CD; with other artists), E-dition Magazine.
- 2006 - Chasing The Dawn: Ultima Thule Ambient Volume 01 (CD; with Steve Roach, Robert Rich and other artists), Ultima Thule Ambient Media.
- 2006 - Vista III (MP3 CD), SoundClickcom.
- 2008 - Stories from the Forest (MP3 CD), TMB Soundworks.
- 2009 - Tones (MP3), Thom Brennan.
- 2010 - Sound Channels (MP3), Thom Brennan.
- 2019 - Imaginary Conquests (CDr), TMB Soundworks.
- 2019 - Soundgardens (CDr), TMB Soundworks.
- 2019 - Elysian Fields (CDr), TMB Soundworks.
- 2019 - Another Time and Space (CDr), TMB Soundworks.
- 2020 - Departures (CDr), TMB Soundworks.
- 2020 - Dragon Fly (CDr), Raingarden SoundWorks.
- 2020 - Home Land (CDr), TMB Soundworks.
- 2020 - Night Lights (CDr), Raingarden Music.
- 2021 - Chasing the Rain (CDr), Raingarden Music.
- 2021 - October (CDr), TMB Soundworks.
- 2022 - Aftermath (CDr), Raingarden SoundWorks.
- 2022 - Between Islands (CDr), Raingarden SoundWorks.
- 2022 - Kyalmaira (CDr), Raingarden Music.
- 2022 - Mist (Remaster) (CDr), Thom Brennan.
- 2022 - Time Works (CDr), Raingarden Music.
- 2022 - Chemical Sunset (CDr), Raingarden Music.
- 2022 - The Dark Quiet (CDr), Thom Brennan.
- 2022 - Aightliste (CDr), Raingarden Music.
- 2022 - Typhoon (CDr), Raingarden Music.
- 2022 - Eventide (CDr), TMB Soundworks.
- 2022 - A Place to Remember (CDr), Raingarden Music.
- 2003 - River Flow (CDr), Thom Brennan.
- 2023 - Argo (Volume One) (CDr), Raingarden SoundWorks.
- 2023 - Argo (Volume Two) (CDr), Raingarden SoundWorks.
- 2023 - Cathedrals (CDr), Raingarden Music.
- 2023 - Wavemaker (CDr), Thom Brennan.
- 2024 - Arium (CDr), Raingarden SoundWorks.
- 2024 - Ghost Prints (CDr), Raingarden SoundWorks.
- 2024 - Othadiegra (CDr), Raingarden SoundWorks.
- 2024 - Silver (Remaster) (CDr), Raingarden Music.
- 2024 - Vibrant Water (Remaster) (CDr), Raingarden Music.
- 2025 - Signs of Life (CDr), Thom Brennan.
- 2025 - A Field of Quiet Standards (CDr), Thom Brennan.
- 2025 - True North (CDr), Thom Brennan.
- 2026 - Alaskan Highway (CDr), Thom Brennan.

== See also ==
- List of ambient music artists
