= Michael Stearns =

American ambient musician and composer

- Born: October 16, 1948 (age 77); Tucson, Arizona, United States
- Genres: Ambient, space, electronic
- Occupations: Musician, composer
- Instruments: Synthesizer, sampler
- Website: www.michaelstearns.com

Michael Stearns (born October 16, 1948) is an American musician and composer of ambient music. He is also known as a film composer, sound designer and soundtrack producer for large format films, theatrical films, documentaries, commercials, and themed attractions.

== Biography ==
Growing up in Tucson, Arizona, Stearns started practicing guitar at 13. At 16, he played in a surf music band, sometimes backing artists such as The Lovin' Spoonful and Paul Revere & the Raiders. Evolving to acid rock, he began composing music on multiple instruments in 1968 and, while in university and in the Air Force, spent a few years studying electronic music synthesis, the physics of musical instruments, and accumulating equipment (musical instruments, tape recorders...) for his first studio.

The studio opened in Tucson, Arizona in 1972 where he produced jingles and commercials for local radio and television, and nationally released jingles for Schlitz Beer and Greyhound Bus Lines. Stearns's interest in experimental "space" music though left him unsatisfied, as he found no audience to play his musical ideas, which could be at this time only related to the drug experience. After three years, Stearns underwent a spiritual crisis and thought about abandoning his career as a musician.

In 1975, Stearns met Emilie Conrad and Gary "Da'oud" David. Emily Conrad ran meditation classes in a workshop named Continuum, with Gary David performing on a Minimoog and looped tapes during the classes. Stearns and his girlfriend Susan Harper moved in Los Angeles, California, to join Emily Conrad, and Michael Stearns became a resident musician and composer until 1981. He developed then on synthesizers musical ideas that would feed his first solo albums.

By 1977, Stearns had formed a small independent record label (Continuum Montage) with Susan Harper and a close friend and investor, David Breuer. The same year came the first releases on tape, Desert Moon Walk and Sustaining Cylinders, followed by Ancient Leaves, his first album released on LP, in 1978.

In the same years, Stearns started out playing with Fred Stofflet a percussionist, then with Don Preston, the former keyboardist for The Mothers of Invention. Both of them were playing for Emily David's classes. After that, Stearns, Stofflet and Craig Hundley, a friend of Gary David's, started a free jazz group called "Alivity". Kevin Braheny came to one of their concerts and became friends with Stearns. He later joined Stearns to play live for Continuum, bringing his Serge synthesizer with him, on which Stearns would record his album Morning Jewel in 1979 before building his own Serge synthesizer. In the same period, Stearns started working with Craig Huxley scoring movies and developed a friendship with Stephen Hill.

In 1981, Continuum moved to a new location and Stearns began a solo career. He put together some ideas he performed live during the workshops on his Serge and came to his classic Planetary Unfolding. Ideas of the same kind were put together to form the album Light Play in 1983 and the track "Return" on the album Lyra.

Stearns signed on the label Sonic Atmospheres in 1984, on which some of his earlier works would be re-released (Light Play became M'Ocean in 1984, Morning Jewel became Jewel in 1985, and Planetary Unfolding was given a new release in 1985). In 1984, Chronos was the first film music done entirely by Stearns after years of collaboration with Huxley or Maurice Jarre. In 1986, he provided "electronic images and textures" for Constance Demby's album Novus Magnificat. After two more releases for Sonic Atmospheres, Plunge (1986) and Floating Whispers (1987), Stearns signed to Stephen Hill's new label Hearts of Space Records and released Encounter.

In the next years, Stearns worked again with Ron Fricke, scoring Baraka, his best-known composition, and released several albums, working with Steve Roach, Kevin Braheny and/or Ron Sunsinger (1989 : Desert Solitaire, 1994 : Singing Stones and Kiva) or alone (1993 : Sacred Sites, 1995 : The Lost World).

In 2000 and 2001, Stearns, now established in Santa Fe, New Mexico, released several albums on his own label Earth Turtle : Within, The Middle of Time, Spirits of the Voyage, The Storm, and Sorcerer. Stearns was involved in the music for the film Samsara which premiered in 2011.

In 2020, Stearns scored the music for the movie Switzerlanders. He also released 2 albums, Convergence with Erik Wøllo in 2020 and Beyond Space And Time with Steve Roach in 2021.

== Instruments ==
In his earlier albums, he often used the Serge Modular synthesizer, giving his music a twinkling and "cosmic" sound. In 1982, he built "The Beam", a 12-foot-long (3.7 m) acoustic instrument strung with 24 piano strings, designed by Jonathan W. Lazell and built with the help of Paul Abell. He has since used it in many albums (solo or collaboration) as well as in concert and film scores. At the end of the eighties, his sound became deeper and closer to Steve Roach's style. Michael Stearns' music is always very ambient and woven with sounds of nature or human voices. But it can also be more melodic with great themes evoking wide spaces or great landscapes.

== Discography ==
=== Solo works ===
- 1977 – Ancient Leaves, Continuum Montage
- 1977 – Sustaining Cylinders, Continuum Montage
- 1979 – Morning Jewel, Continuum Montage
- 1981 – Planetary Unfolding, Continuum Montage
- 1983 – Light Play, Continuum Montage
- 1983 – Lyra Sound Constellation, Continuum Montage
- 1984 – M'Ocean (Light Play reissue), Sonic Atmospheres
- 1985 – Chronos, Sonic Atmospheres
- 1986 – Plunge, Sonic Atmospheres
- 1987 – Floating Whispers, Sonic Atmospheres
- 1988 – Encounter, Hearts of Space Records
- 1993 – Sacred Site, Hearts of Space Records
- 1995 – The Lost World, Fathom/Hearts of Space Records
- 1996 – The Light in the Trees, Amplexus
- 1996 – Collected Ambient and Textural Works 1977–1987, Fathom/Hearts of Space Records
- 1996 – Collected Thematic Works 1977–1987, Fathom/Hearts of Space Records
- 1998 – Within – The Nine Dimensions, Earth Turtle
- 2000 – Spirits of the Voyage, Earth Turtle
- 2000 – The Middle of Time, Earth Turtle
- 2001 – The Storm, Spotted Peccary Music
- 2015 – The Soft Touch Of Morning Light (Three Pieces for Serge Synth 1979)
- 2016 – Music For The Dome (Three Planetarium Scores)
- 2024 – Beyond Chaos, Earth Turtle

=== Collaborations ===
- 1989 – Desert Solitaire, Fortuna/Celestial Harmonies) – with Steve Roach and Kevin Braheny
- 1994 – Singing Stones, Fathom/Hearts of Space Records – with Ron Sunsinger
- 1995 – Kiva, Fathom/Hearts of Space Records – with Steve Roach and Ron Sunsinger
- 2000 – Sorcerer, Spotted Peccary Music – with Ron Sunsinger
- 2020 – Convergence, Projekt Records – with Erik Wøllo
- 2021 – Beyond Earth & Sky – with Steve Roach

=== Compilations, soundtracks & others ===
- 1990 – Dali, The Endless Enigma, Coriolis
- 1992 – Baraka, Milan
- 1994 – Deep Space, Omni
- 1995 – Musique Mechanique, Celestial Harmonies
- 1996 – Storm of Drones, Sombient
- 1996 – Celestial Journey, Rising Star
- 1997 – Songs of the Spirit, Triloka
- 1998 – Trance Planet 4, Triloka
- 1998 – Soundscape Gallery 2, Lektronic Soundscapes
- 2002 - The Fire This Time
- 2011 – Samsara
- 2018 – Alpha with Joseph S. DeBeasi, Madison Gate Records
