= Gaudete =

16th-century sacred Christmas carol

Gaudete by Collegium Vocale Bydgoszcz

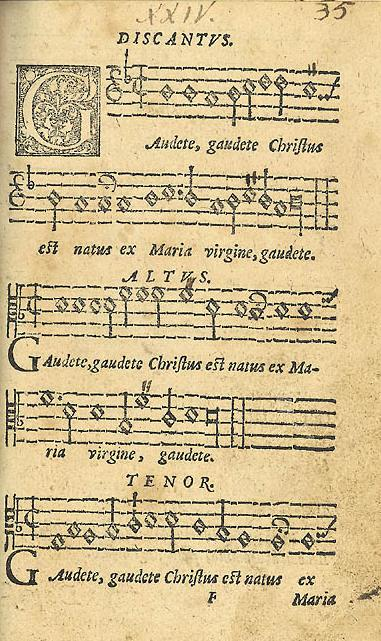
The first page of the original version

Gaudete (English: /ɡɔːˈdiːtiː/ gaw-DEE-tee or English: /ɡaʊˈdeɪteɪ/ gow-DAY-tay, Ecclesiastical Latin: [ɡau̯ˈdete]; "rejoice [ye]" in Latin) (Note: Considering that gaudete is the second-person plural present active imperative case of gaudeo ("I rejoice"), whilst gaude is the second-person singular present active imperative, it can thus be more accurately and poetically interpreted that the former is "rejoice ye", and the latter is "rejoice thou". However, most English translations of the carol merely translate the word as "rejoice!", with the plurality being implicit in its address to the audience.) is a sacred Christmas carol, thought to have been composed in the 16th century. It was published in Piae Cantiones, a collection of Finnish/Swedish sacred songs published in 1582 in the North German city of Greifswald. No music is given for the verses, but the standard tune comes from older liturgical books. There is a known entry from around 1420 in the Hussite Jistebnice hymnal (Jistebnický kancionál).

The Latin text is a typical medieval song of praise, which follows the standard pattern for the time – a uniform series of four-line stanzas, each preceded by a two-line refrain (in the early English carol this was known as the burden). Carols could be on any subject, but typically they were about the Virgin Mary, the Saints or Yuletide themes.

== Text ==
The complete text of "Gaudete", including the refrain:

Latin	English
Gaudēte, gaudēte! Chrīstus est nātus Ex Marīā virgine, gaudēte!	Rejoice, rejoice! Christ is born Of the Virgin Mary – Rejoice!
Tempus adest grātiae Hoc quod optābāmus, Carmina laetitiae Dēvōtē reddāmus.	The time of grace has come— What we have wished for; Songs of joy Let us give back faithfully.
Deus homō factus est Nātūrā mirante, Mundus renovātus est Ā Chrīsto regnante.	God has become man, With nature marvelling, The world has been renewed By the reigning Christ.
Ezechiēlis porta Clausa pertrānsītur, Unde lūx est orta Salūs invenītur.	The closed gate of Ezekiel; Is passed through, Whence the light is risen; Salvation has been found.
Ergō nostra cōntiō Psallat iam in lūstrō; Benedīcat Dominō: Salūs Regī nostrō.	Therefore, let our assembly Now sing in brightness Let it bless the Lord: Greetings to our King.

== Recordings ==
=== 1970s ===
- British folk rock group Steeleye Span had a hit in 1973 (No. 14, UK singles chart) with an a cappella recording of the song. Guitarist Bob Johnson had heard the song when he attended a folk-carol service with his father-in-law in Cambridge, and brought it to the attention of the rest of the band. (Unlike the album version which fades up slowly and fades down slowly, the single is at the same volume for the entire length of the song.) This single is one of only two top 20 British hits to be sung fully in Latin (the other was a recording of "Pie Jesu" from Andrew Lloyd Webber's Requiem performed by Sarah Brightman and Paul Miles-Kingston in 1986). "Gaudete" is also one of only a handful of a cappella performances to become hit singles. When "Gaudete" was performed on Top of the Pops, the resident dance troupe walked onto the set in medieval-style robes, holding candles, followed by the members of Steeleye Span.

=== 1980s ===
- Pertti Neumann, a Finnish singer-songwriter and frontman of the 1980s pop-rock group Dingo recorded a version of "Gaudete" for his first solo album Albion, released in 1986. Boy soprano solo vocals were provided by Niko Haukkala of the choir Cantores Minores.

=== 1990s ===
- British vocal ensemble King's Singers recorded "Gaudete" for their 1990 A Little Christmas Music album.
- The Boston Camerata, under the direction of Joel Cohen, recorded a version of "Gaudete" entitled "Gaudete, Gaudete" for the Dec 1985 album A Renaissance Christmas.
- An arrangement featuring the Choir of Clare College Cambridge, accompanied by a cello ensemble, descant recorder and medieval tabor under the direction of Geoffrey Simon, was recorded in 1996 for a CD entitled A Cello Christmas on the Cala Records label.
- Irish choral group Anúna performed "Gaudete" on their 1996 CD, Omnis with a solo by Eurovision Song Contest (1996) winner Eimear Quinn.
- In 1997, it was recorded by the female vocal group Mediæval Bæbes as part of their No. 2 selling classical recording Salva Nos and also on their Christmas themed recording Mistletoe and Wine (2003).
- In 1999, harpist Kim Robertson offered a rendition of the song on her disc The Spiral Gate.
- In 1999, a version by El Duende was included on Projekt Records' compilation album Excelsis Vol. 2: a winter's song.

=== 2000s ===
- A group of Dominican friars based in Kraków, Poland, recorded a choral version of "Gaudete" for their 2004 album Jezu, Śliczny Kwiecie (Jesus, Oh Lovely Flower), released under the name Bracia dominikanie (Brothers Dominicans).
- The British boy choir Libera recorded "Gaudete" on their 2001 album Luminous, and performed the song on Aled Jones' DVD Aled's Christmas Carols in 2008. Libera has also included this song on at least 3 Christmas albums, in 2011, 2013, and 2019.
- A version using a male soloist was released on Anúna's CD and DVD Celtic Origins (2007) and was broadcast across the USA in 2007–2008 on PBS.
- Tenebrae released a version arranged by Karl Jenkins, both with percussion and as a pure a cappella version in October 2004 on the album Gaudete.
- German medieval rock band Schelmish performed "Gaudete" on their 2006 album Mente Capti.
- Chris Squire and a choir recorded a rock version on the 2007 Christmas album Chris Squire's Swiss Choir.

=== 2010s ===
- Choral ensemble Anúna included the song in an arrangement by Michael McGlynn on the PBS Television special Celtic Origins and the CD release of the same name (2007).
- "Gaudete" was recorded a cappella by Pure Reason Revolution as a Christmas bonus track on their EP "Valour" (2011).
- British alternative rock band Cauda Pavonis included a recording of "Gaudete" on their 2012 Christmas EP entitled Saturnalia.
- The Irish group Celtic Thunder recorded "Gaudete" on their 2013 album Christmas Voices.
- On 28 October 2013, British synth-pop group Erasure released their electronic version of "Gaudete" as the first single from their Christmas-themed album Snow Globe. Their version reached the Top 30 in UK indie singles chart and the Top 40 in Billboard dance chart.
- Serpentyne recorded an ambient/rock version on their 2014 CD Myth & Muses.
- The St Paul's Cathedral Choir included the song on their 2015 Christmas album "Carols with St. Paul's Cathedral Choir" under director Andrew Carwood.
- The Dominican Sisters of Mary, Mother of the Eucharist included a traditional choral version of "Gaudete" on their 2017 album, Jesu, Joy of Man's Desiring: Christmas with the Dominican Sisters of Mary.
- All-female acapella group Papagena sang a 'funky upbeat' version of Gaudete on The Darkest Midnight tour in December 2017, and released it on the eponymous album in early 2018.

=== 2020s ===
- Celtic music group Runa included an upbeat rendition of the song in an arrangement of Brightest and Best, Gaudete and Noel Nouvelet on their 2020 CD album The Tide of Winter.
- Sam Battle of Look Mum No Computer rearranged the song to be played on a set of modular analog synthesisers as part of an electro 2022 Christmas Carol compilation.

=== Parodies ===
- In 2013, a parody arrangement of "Gaudete", called "Crudités", was released by the British folk duet Blanche Rowen & Mike Gulston.
- A parody of "Gaudete", replacing the original words of the verses by sex-related terms, was recorded by the German medieval metal band Potentia Animi on their 2004 album Das erste Gebet.
- In the TV comedy I'm Alan Partridge, Alan manages to take Jill from his production company on a date to an owl sanctuary. In the car on the way home, Alan promises Jill something that "will blow your socks off" before singing along in an over-the-top manner to the Steeleye Span version of "Gaudete" on the car stereo.

== See also ==
- List of Christmas carols
