= Ely Imps =

The Ely Imps is a Choir for 7–13 year olds based in Ely Cathedral, their conductor is Paul Trepte.

== History ==
=== 2006: John Rutter concert ===
The Ely Imps was started in 2006 as a choir for a concert with John Rutter conducting and composing music for them. Children from all around the District came to perform, some even coming from as far as Peterborough. The average number of kids there was 108.

=== 2007: Upcoming success ===
After a sold-out concert, The choir was kept going, as Director of music Paul Trepte became conductor. In 2007 the Imps did Three Concerts at Christmas, two with the Cathedral Choristers and one on their own. All Three Concerts sold out. This saw a rise in Children joining.

=== 2008–present: A success ===
In May 2008 the Imps sang songs by Richard Rodney Bennett. Then in June went to the Cambridgeshire music concert with 2000 other kids. In December another jam-packed Christmas Period led to a concert with the Mediæval Bæbes in 2009. December 2009 saw them do 4 concerts for Christmas. In April 2010 they will do another concert with the Mediæval Bæbes and the May Day concert which attracts around 2000 people every year.

== Staff ==
Conductors:

- John Rutter 2006
- Paul Trepte 2007–present

Organists:

- Alex ??? 2006-2007
- Johnathan Lilley 2008–present.

Admin:

- Anne Mizen 2006–present

== Concerts ==
=== 2006 ===
- John Rutter concert

=== 2007 ===
- Christmas Concert
- Crib Service
- Carol Concert

=== 2008 ===
- May Day Concert
- Wood Green Animal Shelter Charity Concert
- Christmas Concerts (2)
- Crib Service
- Cambridgeshire Music

=== 2009 ===
- Medieval Babes
- May Day
- Christmas Concerts (3)
- Crib Service

=== 2010 ===
- Mediæval Bæbes
- May Day (TBC)
