= Reptilian conspiracy theory =

Conspiracy theory of reptilian humanoids

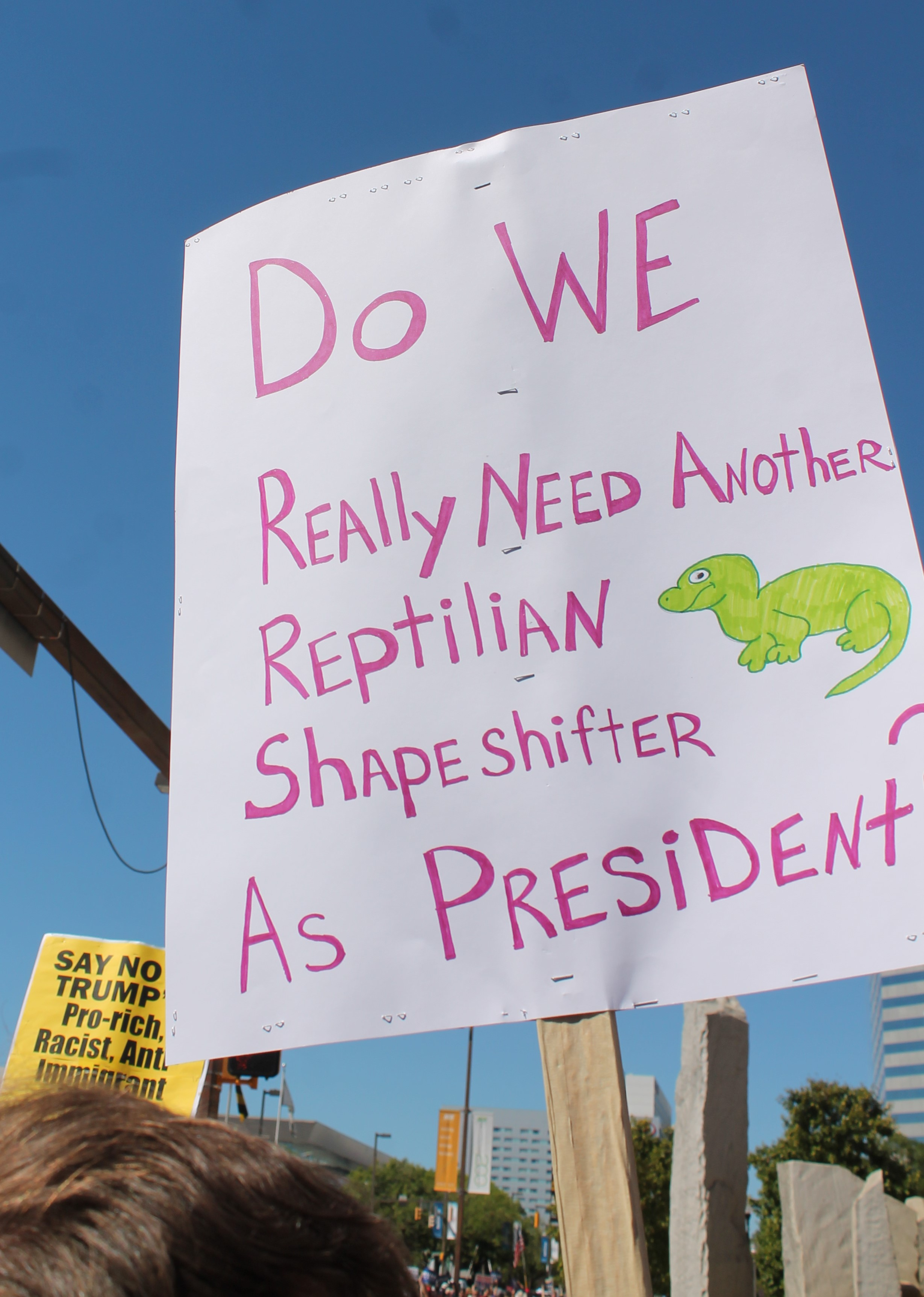
A protest sign referring to conspiracy theory about reptilian politicians

Reptilians (also called archons, reptoids, reptiloids, saurians, draconians, or lizard people) are reptilian humanoids which play a prominent role in fantasy, science fiction, ufology, and conspiracy theories. The idea of reptilians was popularised by David Icke, a conspiracy theorist who claims shapeshifting reptilian aliens control Earth by taking on human form and gaining political power to manipulate human societies. Icke has stated on multiple occasions that many world leaders were, or are possessed by, so-called reptilians.

== Origins ==
Michael Barkun, professor of political science at Syracuse University, posits that the idea of a reptilian conspiracy originated in the fiction of Conan the Barbarian creator Robert E. Howard, in his story "The Shadow Kingdom" (1929). This story drew on theosophical ideas of the "lost worlds" of Atlantis and Lemuria, particularly Helena Blavatsky's The Secret Doctrine (1888), with its reference to "'dragon-men' who once had a mighty civilization on a Lemurian continent".

Howard's "serpent men" were described as humanoids (with human bodies and snake heads) who were able to imitate humans at will, and who lived in underground passages and used their shapechanging and mind-control abilities to infiltrate humanity. Clark Ashton Smith used Howard's "serpent men" in his stories, as well as themes from H. P. Lovecraft, and he, Howard and Lovecraft together laid the basis for the Cthulhu Mythos.

In the 1940s, American occultist Maurice Doreal (also known as Claude Doggins) wrote a pamphlet entitled "Mysteries of the Gobi" that described a "serpent race" with "bodies like man but...heads...like a great snake" and an ability to take human form. These creatures also appeared in Doreal's poem "The Emerald Tablets", in which he referred to Emerald Tablets written by "Thoth, an Atlantean Priest king". Barkun asserts that "in all likelihood", Doreal's ideas came from "The Shadow Kingdom", and that in turn, "The Emerald Tablets" formed the basis for David Icke's book, Children of the Matrix (2001).

Historian Edward Guimont has argued that the reptilian conspiracy theory, particularly as expounded by Icke, drew from earlier pseudohistorical legends developed during the colonisation of Africa, particularly surrounding Great Zimbabwe and the mokele-mbembe.

== Alien abduction ==
Alien abduction narratives sometimes allege contact with reptilian creatures. One of the earliest reports was that of Ashland, Nebraska police officer Herbert Schirmer, who under hypnosis recalled being taken aboard a UFO in 1967 by humanoid beings with a slightly reptilian appearance, who wore a "winged serpent" emblem on the left side of their chests. Skeptics consider his claims to be a hoax. On social media, digitally altered videos depicting people with reptilian eyes blinking were misrepresented to claim that reptilians live secretly among humans.

== David Icke ==
According to British conspiracy theorist David Icke, who first published on this theme in his 1999 work The Biggest Secret, tall, blood-drinking, shape-shifting reptilian humanoids from the Alpha Draconis star system, now hiding in underground bases, are the force behind a worldwide conspiracy against humanity. He contends that most of the world's ancient and modern leaders are related to these reptilians, including the Merovingian dynasty, the Rothschilds, the Bush family and the British Royal family. Icke's conspiracy theories now have supporters in up to 47 countries and he has given lectures to crowds of up to 6,000 people.

American writer Vicki Santillano included Icke's conspiracy theory in her list of the 10 most popular conspiracy theories. A poll of Americans in 2013 by Public Policy Polling indicated that 4% of registered voters (±2.8%) believed in David Icke's ideas.

== Politics ==
On September 12, 2003, during the provincial election campaign in Ontario, Canada, the Progressive Conservative Ernie Eves campaign issued a news release that called opponent Dalton McGuinty an "evil reptilian kitten-eater from another planet". Eves said the epithet was meant as a joke, and acknowledged the words were "over the top", but refused to apologize.

In the closely-fought 2008 U.S. Senate election in Minnesota between comedian and commentator Al Franken and incumbent Senator Norm Coleman, one of the ballots challenged by Coleman included a vote for Franken with "Lizard People" written in the space provided for write-in candidates. Lucas Davenport, who later claimed to have written the gag ballot, said, "I don't know if you've heard the conspiracy theory about the Lizard Men; a friend of mine, we didn't like the candidates, so we were at first going to write in 'revolution', because we thought that was good and to the point. And then, we thought 'the Lizard People' would be even funnier." Franken won the election after recount.

In February 2011, on the Opie and Anthony radio show, the comedian Louis C.K. jokingly asked former U.S. Secretary of Defense Donald Rumsfeld a number of times if he and Dick Cheney were lizard people who enjoyed the taste of human flesh. Amused by Rumsfeld's refusal to directly answer the question, C.K. suggested it was a possible admission of guilt. He went on to further muse that perhaps those who are lizard people cannot lie about it; when asked if they are lizards, they either have to avoid answering the question or say yes.

On March 4, 2013, a video depicting a security agent with unusual features guarding a speech by U.S. President Barack Obama was spotlighted in a Wired report about shapeshifting reptilian humanoids. This led to a tongue-in-cheek response from chief National Security Council spokeswoman Caitlin Hayden who said "any alleged program to guard the president with aliens or robots would likely have to be scaled back or eliminated in the sequester".

In October 2022, Dutch MP Thierry Baudet, head of the far-right Forum for Democracy, said in an interview with the "Geopolitics and Empire" podcast that he believes that the world is "being governed by evil reptiles".

Some adherents of the QAnon conspiracy theory have also borrowed from the reptilian conspiracy theory, including elements shared in antisemitic conspiracy theories.

== See also ==
- Ancient astronauts
- Capgras syndrome
- Demon
- Dinosauroid
- "Eight O'clock in the Morning" by Ray Nelson
- Skrulls & Secret Invasion
- Iron Sky: The Coming Race
- Gamehendge
- Grey alien
- List of alleged UFO-related extraterrestrials
- List of conspiracy theories
- List of reptilian humanoids
- Lizard Man of Scape Ore Swamp
- Men in black
- Narn
- Silurians
- Sleestak
- They Live
- V
- Worldwar
