= Novus Magnificat =

- Original 1986 cassette artwork

Studio album by Constance Demby
- Released: 1986
- Recorded: 1985
- Genres: New-age, space music, ambient
- Length: 53:40 (CD)
- Label: Hearts of Space
- Producers: Constance Demby, Anna Turner

Constance Demby chronology
Sacred Space Music (1982)	Novus Magnificat (1986)	Set Free (1987)

Novus Magnificat: Through the Stargate is the fourth studio album by American musician and composer Constance Demby, with additional contributions by Michael Stearns. It was co-produced by Demby and Anna Turner and released in 1986 on Hearts of Space Records. In its original form, the album features a single 54-minute piece divided into two parts.

The album is regarded as a classic of the new age and space music genres, and has sold over 200,000 copies worldwide. In 2002, it was named as one of the "25 Most Influential Ambient Albums of All Time". A special 30th anniversary edition was released in 2017 which features previously unreleased live tracks.

== Production ==
=== Title ===
The title Novus Magnificat is Latin for "New Magnificat", a reference to the ancient Christian hymn. Inspired by Western classical and sacred music, Novus Magnificat was self-defined as "A Magnificat and Exaltate for digital orchestra, choral voices, and special electronic images" and "Dedicated to the Infinite One..."

=== Recording ===
The album originated in 1982, shortly after Demby had finished her previous studio album, Sacred Space Music. She recalled music entering her head, sketches of which were recorded using a four-track Portastudio cassette recorder. "I was hearing the most incredible music playing inside my head and had no idea how I would duplicate this other dimension, how I would pull it through and get it onto tape in this dimension. For what I heard inside my head made me think, 'How in God's name am I going to duplicate this?'" In 1985, after setting up her home studio, Demby found the task of recording her new ideas somewhat intimidating as she lacked experience of operating the equipment, using a digital sampling synthesizer, or had composed or performed such a longform orchestral composition. To further matters, Demby was unable to record her ideas as she found herself "alone with the equipment and paralyzed with fear", thus creating a block on her creativity. She found a remedy by playing "silly comedy music" first, after which "the music began pouring through".

Demby recorded the album on a Tascam 16-track recorder and plays just three instruments, her main being the E-mu Emulator II, one of the first digital sampling synthesizers, which combined the sound of real symphonic instruments and choirs into a single keyboard. It was hooked to a Roland Juno 60 to provide arpeggiated effects and enhanced sounds. Demby also plays a Yamaha concert grand piano. Apart from the early ideas recorded on the Portastudio of the orchestration, general direction of the music, and emotions that Demby wanted to present, none of the music was written down or scored in advance. Demby used a sound to represent a specific emotion, such as a cello to signify "the searching, yearning heart", or a bassoon for one's higher self, which she wrote was "a more exalted positioning that no longer required searching or yearning, it simply knew. It's job was to 'answer' the questions the cello was asking, a conversation heard in the opening sections".

Demby recorded the composition in sections which were pieced together in post-production; she only heard the final piece in full after mixing was completed seven months later. After Demby had recorded her parts, the music was further enhanced with electronic textures by composer Michael Stearns and refined with co-producer Anna Turner. Mixing was done by herself, Turner, Stephen Hill, and Warren Dennis; some of it was automated, but much of it required the four operating the mixing console in real time.

== Release ==
Novus Magnificat was released by Stephen Hill's Hearts of Space Records, first on cassette in 1986, then on CD in fall 1987, along with a vinyl LP in Japan, licensed to Alfa Records. It was the first of the four Demby albums released or re-released on Hearts of Space Records between 1986 and 1995. The album was also broadcast in full on Hill's syndicated radio show Hearts of Space, in program 105 on June 13, 1986.

In 1987, the last movement of "Novus Magnificat, Part One" (dubbed "My Heart Doth Soar") and the first movement of "Novus Magnificat, Part Two" (dubbed "The Flying Bach") were selected by Demby for her self-released 1978–1986 best-of compilation Light of This World (cassette and CD versions: the vinyl could only fit "The Flying Bach").

In 2001, Hearts of Space Records' trademark and catalogue were sold to Valley Entertainment, which was still distributing the album as of 2009. In 2008, the CD version was complemented with Novus Magnificat (Alternate Version), a downloadable digital album (MP3 files, 256 kbit/s, released June 6, 2008) with the same music cut in a new track list of eleven movements.

== Genre ==
Following Demby's previous studio album Sacred Space Music (1984), Novus Magnificat was tagged "Sacred Space II" (later "Sacred Space Series, vol. II"). Considered part of the new-age music scene, the album is described as "Contemporary classical Spacemusic" in its liner notes, or "symphonic space music" by Allmusic. Its subtitle "Through the Stargate" is complemented with a space-themed cover reminiscent of 2001: A Space Odyssey (whose novel version featured a "Star Gate").

The album is often categorised among ambient music albums; Demby has replied that, "[t]hough we are honoured, Novus Magnificat is not really 'ambient'".

== Reception ==
Professional ratings
Review scores
Source	Rating
Allmusic	5/5 stars

USA Today wrote, "There is no other recording in the electronic genre rooted in the harmonies of Bach and the romantics that is so heartfelt", while Pulse! magazine noted its "Bach-like organs crescendos, its Vivaldi-like string passages".

Though it was not nominated at the newly created "New Age" category of the Grammy Awards, the album sold over 200,000 copies worldwide, making Demby one of the most successful New Age artists of the time, and helped build the reputation of Hearts of Space Records.

In 2002 it was voted #24 of "The 25 Most Influential Ambient Albums of All Time" for New Age Voice.

== Track listing ==
All music by Constance Demby.

=== 1986 cassette ===
1. "Novus Magnificat, Side One" – 26:18
2. "Novus Magnificat, Side Two" – 28:22

=== 1987 vinyl ===
1. "Novus Magnificat, Part One" – 26:15
2. "Novus Magnificat, Part Two" – 28:05

=== 1987 CD ===
1. "Novus Magnificat, Part One" – 26:24
2. "Novus Magnificat, Part Two" – 27:14

=== 2008 digital album ===
1. "Soul's Journey" – 6:51 ["Novus Pt. 1" – 26:34]
2. "Ascent" – 5:12
3. "Tears for Terra" – 4:26
4. "Exultate" – 6:06
5. "My Heart Doth Soar" – 3:59
6. "The Flying Bach" – 6:06 ["Novus Pt. 2" – 27:40]
7. "Trust" – 4:56
8. "Bridging Dimensions" – 3:15
9. "Through the Stargate" – 4:45
10. "Magnificat" – 3:58
11. "Cosmic Carousel" – 4:40

=== 2017 30th Anniversary Edition ===
Disc 1

1. "Soul's Journey" – 6:51 ["Novus Pt. 1" – 26:34]
2. "Ascent" – 5:12
3. "Tears for Terra" – 4:26
4. "Exultate" – 6:06
5. "My Heart Doth Soar" – 3:59
6. "The Flying Bach" – 6:06 ["Novus Pt. 2" – 27:40]
7. "Trust" – 4:56
8. "Bridging Dimensions" – 3:15
9. "Through the Stargate" – 4:45
10. "Magnificat" – 3:58
11. "Cosmic Carousel" – 4:40

Disc 2

1. "Novus Magnificat Live: Baktun 1 (December 21, 2012)" – 12:28
2. "Novus Magnificat Live: Spring Equinox (December 21, 2012)" – 12:07
3. "Novus Magnificat Live: Full Moon Eclipse (March 19, 2011)" – 14:24
4. "Novus Magnificat Live: Baktun 2 (June 26, 2010)" – 12:35
5. "Space Bass: Live Baktun 3 (December 21, 2012)" – 5:44

Two of these movements had already been named in 1987 for the best-of compilation Light of This World. Four more were named (some with a different title) as free MP3 samples provided on Demby's website since at least 2001: this partial track list had "Ascent", "Choral Climax" (now "Exultate"), "My Heart Doth Soar", "The Flying Bach", "Certainty" (now "Trust"), and "Stargate" (now "Through the Stargate").

== Personnel ==
Musical

- Constance Demby – emulated "violas, violins, cello, bassoon, harp, piano, organ, French horn, bells, electronic effects, tympani and chorus" on synthesizers (Emulator II digital sampling, Roland Juno 60), piano (Yamaha C-9 Concert Grand)

with

- Michael Stearns – "additional electronic images and textures" on synthesizers (Serge Modular, Yamaha DX-7, Oberheim OB-8) and "The Beam" (custom 24-string acoustic instrument)

Technical

- Recording: Constance Demby
- Additional engineering and track re-mastering: Warren Dennis (at The Banquet Studio, Santa Rosa, CA) "who made significant technical and musical contributions throughout the project"
- Mixing: Stephen Hill, Warren Dennis (at The Banquet Studio, on Thiel CS-3 and Spica TC-50 monitors)
- Production: Constance Demby, Anna Turner

Graphical

- Original cover painting: Geoffrey Chandler (Visionary Publishing, Inc.)
- Art direction: Nelson & Toews Design
