= Planetary Unfolding =

Studio album by Michael Stearns
- Released: 1981
- Recorded: 1981
- Genre: Space, ambient, new-age
- Length: 45:50
- Label: Continuum Montage (1981), Sonic Atmospheres (1985), Projekt (2022)

Michael Stearns chronology
Morning Jewel (1979)	Planetary Unfolding (1981)	Light Play (1983)

Professional ratings
Review scores
Source	Rating
Allmusic	4/5 stars

Planetary Unfolding (1981) is an album of electronic ambient music by composer and keyboardist Michael Stearns. It is considered a classic of ambient music.

== Overview ==
Michael Stearns became a resident composer/musician at Emily Conrad's meditation classes in 1975. He initially composed and performed on a Minimoog and various electro-acoustic instruments. In 1979 he was introduced to the Serge modular synthesizer by Kevin Braheny who owned a 15-panel system (dubbed "The Mighty Serge"), which Stearns used on Morning Jewel. He then built his own 12-panel Serge. With this he performed electronic music that was evocative of space.

Planetary Unfolding was recorded around 1981, when Michael left Conrad's Continuum Studio. The musical ideas that Michael had been performing on the Serge were combined and developed, giving birth to 52 minutes of music divided into two parts, each part featuring three segments.

The album was first released on Stearns' own label, Continuum Montage. It was reissued on CD in 1985 by Sonic Atmospheres and was long unavailable, until April 2022, when a reissue appeared on Projekt Records. It is also available as a high quality download from Michael Stearns' page https://michaelstearns.bandcamp.com/.

== Track listing ==
1. "In the Beginning..." – 8:00
2. "Toto, I've a Feeling We're Not in Kansas Anymore." – 6:20
3. "Wherever Two or More Are Gathered..." – 9:19
4. Life in the Gravity Well – 6:55
5. As the Earth Kissed the Moon – 9:55
6. "Something's Moving" – 5:19
