= Lullaby for the Hearts of Space =

Studio album by Kevin Braheny
- Released: 1980; July 1, 1991 (rerelease); June 16, 2017 (rerelease)
- Recorded: at KPFA-FM and the Continuum Studio in Los Angeles, California
- Genre: Ambient, new-age
- Length: 68:36
- Label: Hearts of Space Records; HS 11002 (first pressing); HS 11431 (second pressing)
- Producer: Stephen Hill

Kevin Braheny chronology
The Way Home (1978)	Lullaby for the Hearts of Space (1980)	Western Spaces (1987)

Professional ratings
Review scores
Source	Rating
Allmusic	3/5 stars

Lullaby for the Hearts of Space (1980) is an album by the American ambient musician Kevin Braheny.

Both pieces on the album were performed live using the Mighty Serge modular analog synthesizer and were spontaneous, improvised compositions. The first track, "Lullaby for the Hearts of Space", was originally recorded for a Hearts of Space radio special at KPFA-FM in March, 1980. The second track, "After I Said Goodnight," took inspiration from Emilie Conrad-Da'Oud's work Continuum and was created live during one of her classes.

The album was initially released in 1980 by Heartcall Records, with a second pressing that same year by Continuum Montage. In 1986 the album was released by Hearts of Space Records with a re-release by that label in 1991. All these releases were in the cassette format.

Unlike Braheny's other albums, Lullaby for the Hearts of Space was not released on compact disc until 2017, reportedly because Braheny Fortune was not fond of the quality of his earlier work compared to later albums. Braheny Fortune asked Hearts of Space to not release additional copies after the existing copies had sold out and the request was granted. As a result, the album was for many years difficult to find. The 2017 re-release was remastered by Braheny Fortune and was also made available as a digital download.

== Track listings ==
1. "Lullaby for the Hearts of Space" – 35:24
2. "After I Said Goodnight" – 33:12

The liner and label of the Hearts of Space cassettes misprints the track times for the tracks of this album, with "Lullaby for the Hearts of Space" being 25:10 in length and "After I Said Goodnight" at 26:00. Coincidentally, the tracks on Braheny's prior album The Way Home are 25:10 and 26:00, respectively.

== Personnel ==
- Kevin Braheny – The Mighty Serge Modular
