= Kevin Fortune =

Kevin Fortune may refer to:

- Kévin Fortuné (born 1989), footballer
- Kevin Braheny Fortune (born 1952), American musician and composer
