= Anna Turner (producer) =

- Anna Turner in 1973 at NCET

Background information
- Also known as: Annamystic
- Born: Ann Elizabeth McRoskey; December 8, 1942; San Mateo County, California, U.S.
- Origin: San Francisco, California, U.S.
- Died: August 27, 1996 (aged 53) Marin County, California, U.S.
- Genres: New-age, space, ambient
- Occupations: radio producer, radio host, record producer
- Years active: 1973–1990s
- Label: Hearts of Space Records

Anna Turner (December 8, 1942 – August 27, 1996) was an American producer and administrator. Turner is best known as the original partner of Stephen Hill for launching the space music radio show Hearts of Space: she was its original radio co-producer (1973–1987) and early co-host (1974–1986), as well as co-founder and record co-producer (1984–1990s) of the associated label Hearts of Space Records. She was also known in inner circles to be the woman that Christopher Case met prior to his sudden death.

== Biography ==
=== NCET ===
In the early 1970s, Turner worked as general administrative assistant and "Information Director and Tape Librarian" at the [NCET] (National Center for Experiments in Television, a KQED-TV project of the San Francisco visual arts, funded by National Endowment for the Arts and the Rockefeller Foundation), also "coordinating the authorship and publication of written materials concerning NCET."

Turner was described as "sweet, beautiful, skillful, intelligent, insightful, and in our work situations, astoundingly dependable. She was an artistic sounding-board for me, and we worked very closely together on most of my more demanding projects – including being my primary support person throughout the production of the Videola exhibit", as eulogized by ex-boyfriend and NCET's then-resident video artist Don Hallock, who also noted her as "a central element of NCET's success."

=== Hearts of Space ===
In 1973, Turner was the original radio co-producer of Stephen Hill's weekly radio show Hearts of Space (HOS). Turner also became the show's co-host from 1974 to 1986, originally under the on-air pseudonym of "Annamystic" (sometimes rendered "Anna Mystic"). In 1980, Hill and Turner "began to lay the groundwork for national syndication" and in January 1983 the show was syndicated in the U.S. on National Public Radio; as Hill memorialized, "More than anyone else, she was responsible for moving the program into national distribution, for Anna was a person with vision, always moving towards the next frontier."

In mid-1986, Turner started gradually disengaging from the show, with some of her producing duties picked up by "then new, now long running guest producer Ellen Holmes" of Adagio Recordings. According to a fan timeline of the show, Turner's last show dual-narrated with Hill was program 109 "Departure" (October 1986) and her last show as narrator was program 118 "Dona Nobis Pacem" (December 1986). Her last co-production credit was for program 121 "Take It to Heart"; Turner co-produced 114 of the syndicated shows, being most programs from #1 (January 1983) to #121 (February 1987).

=== HOS Records ===
In 1980, Hill and Turner decided to expand the radio program and started a mail order business to sell the albums played on the show; together they wrote a 100-page annotated catalog called The Hearts of Space Guide to Cosmic, Transcendent and Innerspace Music (1981, OCLC 9950472). They also spent time helping some artists produce records, such as Constance Demby's 1982 Sacred Space Music, whose liner notes credited Hill and expressed "to Anna Turner of Music for the Hearts of Space, the deepest appreciation and gratitude for her guidance – both artistic and musical – and for the depth of her wisdom, generosity and love."

In 1984, Hill and Turner co-founded the show's record label, Hearts of Space Records (later sold to Valley Entertainment in 2001). Turner was a record co-producer for some of its about 150 releases, such as Constance Demby's best-selling Novus Magnificat (1986). She also co-produced the New Age compilation Polar Shift: A Benefit for Antarctica (1991, including Demby, Yanni, and Vangelis), released by Picture Music.

=== Personal life ===
Anna Turner was born in 1942. After her Hearts of Space years, Turner lived up to her old radio pseudonym "Annamystic" when according to her friend Don Hallock, she "embarked on an intense journey of spiritual inquiry. She spent considerable time studying with New Age inspirational speaker Jach Pursel, who allegedly channeled a "multidimensional entity" named Lazaris.

According to Hill, Anna Turner died of "a fast moving form of cancer" on August 27, 1996, "in her early 50s." The next month, Hearts of Space broadcast a memorial to her with a rerun of program 91 re-titled the "Anna Turner Tribute" and introduced by Stephen Hill, who said that "this program captures a big part of Anna Turner's being: full of light, beauty, and vision, always reaching for the next frontier."
