= Constance Demby =

American multi-instrumentalist player (1939–2021)

- Demby in the 1980s

Background information
- Born: Constance Mary Eggers; May 9, 1939; Oakland, California, U.S.
- Died: March 20, 2021 (aged 81) Pasadena, California, U.S.
- Genres: Ambient; space music; new age
- Occupations: Musician; composer; painter; sculptor; multimedia producer
- Instruments: Various, including keyboards, hammered dulcimer, space bass, whale sail
- Years active: 1960s–2021
- Formerly of: Robert Rutman; Dorothy Carter

Constance Mary Demby (née Eggers; May 9, 1939 – March 20, 2021) was an American musician, composer, painter, sculptor, and multimedia producer. Her music included new age, ambient, and space music styles. She is best known for her 1986 album Novus Magnificat and her two experimental musical instruments, the sonic steel space bass and the whale sail.

== Early life and education ==
Demby was born in Oakland, California, on May 9, 1939. After the family moved to Connecticut, Demby began classical piano lessons at age eight, and soon became confident enough to perform solo and in a group. In addition to music, she also took to painting and sculpture and received an "Excellence in Art" award for her work from Pine Manor College in Chestnut Hill, Massachusetts.

Demby studied sculpture and painting at the University of Michigan in Ann Arbor, Michigan, where she received a Highby Award for excellence in art in 1960.

== Career ==
In 1960, Demby quit her studies and moved to Greenwich Village in New York City. She continued to work as a musician and sculptor, combining these disciplines with her first sheet metal sound sculptures, built in 1966. She was torching a sheet of metal in her sculptural practice when she noticed the low tones and unusual sounds that the vibrating metal produced, which subsequently led to the development of her first handmade instruments.

In 1967, Demby used these sculptures in a series of happening-style events at the Charles Street Gallery named A Fly Can't Bird But a Bird Can Fly, owned by Robert Rutman. In one piece called "The Thing", Rutman wore a white cardboard box and banged on Demby's sheet metal creation with "a rock in a sock." Demby conceived a multimedia environmental experience called Space Mass, which featured a 24-foot altar, temples, and sculptures that acted as moving screens to project abstract films. Demby welded a curved metal sheet to several steel rods which she played as a percussion instrument. Rutman later remarked, "We thought it would sound good as a xylophone, but it didn't." Throughout the decade Demby exhibited her work in solo and group settings in New York City, Boston, and Maine. In 1968, she held her first major solo show in New York City, combining her paintings, sculptures, and light and sound displays, by which time she had explored electronic music for the first time.

In 1971, after she moved to Maine with Rutman, the duo formed the Central Maine Power Music Company (CMPMC), a multimedia sound and light group influenced by their previous Space Mass exhibit. They used uncommon eastern instruments combined with electronic music with video and laser light projections. They toured the eastern US extensively, with the group ranging from 6 to 20 members at any given performance. Among the guest musicians involved were hammer dulcimer player Dorothy Carter and video artist Bill Etra. The band toured the East Coast, playing at planetariums in Massachusetts, as well as Lincoln Center, the World Trade Center, and at the United Nations Sculpture Garden in New York City. Demby's co-founder told a reporter in 1974:

The best way to describe our music is to call it 'not music.' You see, it often happens that when people hear us play, they say, either in anger or in delight, 'That's not music!' It's somewhat akin to the paintings of Jackson Pollock. When the art buffs first saw his work, with the paint drippings and all, they said, 'That's not painting.'

In 1976, the CMPMC disbanded and its founders moved to Cambridge, Massachusetts. While Rutman went on to pursue directions in contemporary classical and industrial music with the sheet metal instruments that they had created, Demby headed down a quieter path. She studied yoga with Ajaib Singh, known as Sant Ji, and, in 1977, co-formed the Gandharva Performing Arts Company, a duo featuring the flute, tabla and dulcimer with Robert Bennett.

By the late 1970s, Demby had become a multi-instrumentalist who was proficient in musical improvisation, vocals, hammered dulcimer, koto, tamboura, and various keyboards and synthesizers. She made her studio recording debut on Dorothy Carter's debut album, Troubadour (1976). Demby's first solo album, Skies Above Skies (1978), comprised devotional prayers set to music featuring hammer dulcimer, ch'eng, tambura, synthesizer, cello, piano, organ, and voice reciting lines from the Bible, Hindi scripture, and the Popol Vuh.

In 1979, following a pilgrimage to India, Demby settled in Marin County, California, just north of San Francisco. She founded the record label Sound Currents to release her second album, Sunborne (1980), inspired by the Emerald Tablets of Thoth the Atlantean, a 20th-century work by occultist Maurice Doreal. Her hammer dulcimer-oriented album Sacred Space Music (1982) followed on the Hearts of Space Records label. Demby performed at the Alaron Center in Sausalito, spawning her Live at Alaron (1984) album which displays themes the in her definitive studio album, Novus Magnificat (1986).

In 2000, Demby left California for Spain, eventually settling in Sitges near Barcelona, where she recorded Sanctum Sanctuorum (2001), a reworked version of Faces of the Christ (2000) with added keyboard parts and choral and Gregorian chant.

Demby returned to the US in 2004, touring the West Coast presenting concerts and healing workshops. Her Sound Currents label subsequently released Sonic Immersion (2004), a vibrational sound healing attunement through use of the Space Bass.

In addition to her studio albums, Demby is best known for creating two experimental musical instruments: the Whale Sail and the Sonic Steel Space Bass. These 10-foot-long sheet metal idiophones are played with a bass bow to create low resonating tones. George Lucas' Skywalker Ranch licensed the sounds of the Space Bass for use in their film scores, and The Discovery Channel filmed the Space Bass in Gaudi's Park Güell in Barcelona for one of their specials. The Space Bass is also featured on the soundtrack for the IMAX film Chronos (1985), directed by Ron Fricke and featuring music by Michael Stearns.

The International Space Science Institute commissioned Demby to create a score for the film I AM, and Demby's album Spirit Trance (2004) features four selections from the film. The track "Legend" on the same album was composed for Alan Hauge's film James Dean – An American Legend. Due to complications with the James Dean Foundation, however, the project was shelved.

Samples from Sonic Immersion, primarily from tracks titled "Chakra", were used in the soundtrack to the 2025 film Mission: Impossible – The Final Reckoning.

== Personal life and death ==
In 1961, Eggers married David Demby and they had one son, Joshua. The marriage ended in divorce in 1974.

Demby's nephew is writer, editor, and publisher Dave Eggers.

Demby died in Pasadena, California, on March 20, 2021, at age 81, three days after being hospitalized with a heart attack.

== Discography ==
Studio albums

- Skies Above Skies (1978)
- Sunborne (1980)
- Sacred Space Music (1982)
- Novus Magnificat: Through the Stargate (1986)
- Set Free (1989)
- Æterna (1995)
- Faces of the Christ (2000)
- Sanctum Sanctuorum (2001)
- Spirit Trance (2004)
- Sonic Immersion: A Vibratory Tonal Attunement (2004)
- Ambrosial Waves – Healing Waters (2011)
- Ambrosial Waves – Tidal Pools (2013)
- Novus Magnificat: Through the Stargate – 30th Anniversary Edition (2017)

Live albums

- Constance Demby at Alaron – Live Concert Recording (1984)
- Attunement: Live in Concert (2000)
- Live in Tokyo (2003)

Videos

- Live in Tokyo
- Meet Constance Demby

Compilations

- Light of This World (1987)

Appearances

- Dorothy Carter – Troubadour (1976)
- Michael Stearns – Chronos (Original Soundtrack Recording) (1984)
- Stephen Coughlin – Breeze at Dawn (1989)
- Various Artists – Polar Shift (1991)
- Various Artists – Illumination
- Arjuna Ardagh and Constance Demby – Guided Meditations: The Heart Meditation (1998)
- Arjuna Ardagh and Constance Demby – Guided Meditations: The Beloved (1998)
- Eterna (Linda Bandino) and Constance Demby – The Journey Home
- Eterna (Linda Bandino) and Constance Demby – The Master Healing Ray
