= Wolfram Spyra =

German composer of ambient music (born 1964)

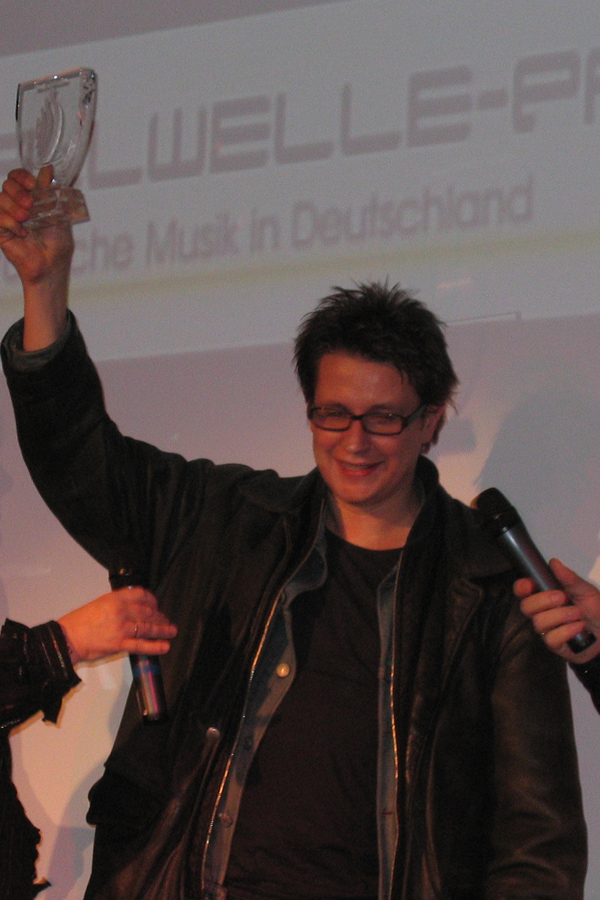
Wolfram Spyra

Wolfram Spyra (born 12 December 1964) is a German composer of ambient music.

Spyra was born in Eschwege. He began his career in the early 1990s constructing 'soundscapes' and installations around Germany. He has collaborated with a wide range of visual artists, musicians, producers and DJs, including Pete Namlook as the duo Virtual Vices, and with Robert Rutman as a member of the Steel Cello Ensemble.

Spyra has released several albums, starting in 1995 with Homelistening Is Killing Clubs. Spyra's focus is on instrumental electronic music that incorporates samples, synthesizers, percussion and other elements. While sometimes experimental, most of his music has a certain accessibility in terms of the rhythmic and melodic components. Though frequently associated with the retro or Berlin School sound pioneered by Klaus Schulze and others, he uses modern ambient electronica elements extensively, creating his own rich sound that defies easy categorization.

== Discography ==
- Sex, Chaos, Energy (Maxi-single) (1995)
- Homelistening Is Killing Clubs (1995)
- Phonehead (1997)
- My Little Garden of Sounds (1997)
- Future of the Past (1997)
- VCM 100F (Maxi-single) (1997)
- Sferics (1998)
- Kassels Akustischer Stadtplan (1998)
- Virtual Vices (with Pete Namlook) (1998)
- Etherlands (1999)
- Virtual Vices II (with Pete Namlook) (2000)
- Elevator to Heaven (2001)
- Virtual Vices III (with Pete Namlook) (2001)
- Virtual Vices IV (with Pete Namlook) (2002)
- Invisible Fields (2003)
- Achtundsechzig 24 Live@Toskana-Therme (2003)
- Excerpts 1 (2004)
- Headphone Concert: Little Garden of Sounds II (2004)
- Meditationen (2005)
- Orphan Waves (2006)
- Virtual Vices V (with Pete Namlook) (2006)
- Space Cowboys @ Jelenia Góra (2007)
- High Phidelity (2007)
- Gasoline 91 Octane (2008)
- Virtual Vices VI (with Pete Namlook) (2008)
- January in June (2009)
- SeQuest (with Chris Lang) (2010)
- ADSR Remixed (Maxi-single with Steve Baltes) (2010)
- No Beats For 1 Hour (0B41H) (2010)
- Staub (2014)
- Requiem (2017)
