= Richard Burmer =

Musical artist (1955-2006)

Background information
- Born: September 19, 1955; Owosso, Michigan, Michigan
- Died: September 9, 2006 (aged 50) Saginaw, Michigan, Michigan
- Genre: electronic music
- Occupations: composer, engineer

Richard Steven Burmer (September 19, 1955 – September 9, 2006) was an American composer, engineer, sound designer, musician and ethnomusicologist. His work with electronic music combined with musical styles and instruments from around the world formed his own unique and distinct sound.

== Early life ==
Richard was born September 19, 1955, in Owosso, Michigan, the son of Henry Stanley Burmer and Theresa (Suchozenka) Burmer. As a youth growing up in Michigan, he was introduced to the music of India, the Middle East, contemporary orchestral composers, and electronic music. He found a wide palette of musical textures with synthesizers, and the original sampler, the Mellotron. Influences also came from The Moody Blues, King Crimson, and Pink Floyd. He graduated from Corunna High School in Michigan.

== Career ==
After spending time in college studying music theory and composition, Richard moved to Los Angeles where he became a sound designer for E-mu Systems in Santa Cruz and engineer/synth programmer for EFX systems in Burbank.

Richard Burmer died of heart disease on Saturday, September 9, 2006, in Saginaw, Michigan, at the age of 50. A 2007 Hearts of Space radio show episode entitled "Across the View" (Program #794) was dedicated to his memory. The radio show Echoes released a tribute podcast for Burmer on the tenth anniversary of his death in 2016.

== Discography ==
- 1984 - Mosaic (Fortuna Records, re-released on American Gramaphone Records)
- 1987 - Bhakti Point (Fortuna Records, re-released on American Gramaphone Records)
- 1987 - Western Spaces (Collaborative album with Steve Roach and Kevin Braheny)
- 1988 - On the Third Extreme (Gaia Records, re-released on American Gramaphone Records)
- 1992 - Invention (American Gramaphone Records)
- 1994 - Collections from a Gallery (Richard Burmer compilation from Japan)
- 1995 - Shining by the River (Burmer compilation by Audio Alternatives Record Company featuring Richard Burmer`s personal favourites from the albums Bhakti Point, On The Third Extreme and Invention, plus some extra tracks from the Day Parts Series, released on these albums (see below).
- 1996 - Treasures of the Saints (Miramar/BMG Records)
- 1996/2023 - World Fusion (Unreleased/later released Digital only Album by FirstCom Music/Universal)
- 1993/2026 Heartland (Sampler together with other Artists) feat. 3 unreleased Richard Burmer Tracks (1. Keokuk, 2. Sunrise Springs, 3. Ancients) (Unreleased/later released Digital only Album from FirstCom/Universal)

=== Individual pieces ===
- 1982 - "Intro" (on album Music from the 21st Century) (vinyl-only track)
- 1996 - "Tristan and the Book" (on sampler Miramar 10)
- 1999 - "Moon Ghost Waltz" (Written by Michael Hoppe, performed by Richard Burmer solo (not to be confused by the official release of this title as a Michael Hoppe track with Tim Wheater (flute) and Richard Burmer (sound effects) on The Unforgetting Heart by Michael Hoppe; Richard Burmer version released 2013 on Michael Hoppe`s album Rarities (download-only album)
- 2000 - "Sun's Comin' Out" (on sampler Cousteau`s Dream - Real Music)

==== Western Spaces with Steve Roach/Kevin Braheny (1987 Innovative Communications release) ====
- 1987 - "Across the View" (re-released on the sampler Sunday Morning Coffee in 1991)
- 1987 - "A Story From The Rain" (re-released on the sampler Sunday Morning Coffee in 1991)

==== Day Parts Series by Chip Davis (on American Gramaphone) ====
- 1992 - "The Rain Will Bless The Love" (from Day Parts Romance)
- 1992 - "Shining By The River" (from Day Parts Romance)
- 1993 - "Meadow Drive" (from Day Parts Sunday Morning Coffee II)
- 1993 - "Downstream" (from Day Parts Sunday Morning Coffee II)
- 1997 - "Embracement" (from Day Parts Romance II)
- 1997 - "Walk Into The Love" (from Day Parts Romance II)

=== Additional Collaborations ===
- 1986 - Point Of Arrival by Loren Nerell, feat. Richard Burmer on additional synthesizer
- 1988 - Galaxies by Kevin Braheny, feat. Richard Burmer on additional synthesizer
- 1996 - Wind Songs by Michael Hoppe, feat. Tim Wheater on flute and Richard Burmer (sound effects)
- 1998 - The Unforgetting Heart by Michael Hoppe, feat. Tim Wheater on flute and Richard Burmer (sound effects)
