= Sacred Space Music =

Studio album by Constance Demby
- Released: 1982
- Genre: New-age
- Length: 40:58
- Label: Sound Currents/Gandarva
- Producer: Constance Demby, Warren Dennis, Stephen Hill

Constance Demby chronology
Sunborne (1980)	Sacred Space Music (1982)	Novus Magnificat (1986)

Professional ratings
Review scores
Source	Rating
Allmusic	3/5 stars

Sacred Space Music is the third album of new-age composer Constance Demby.

== Track listing ==
All music is composed by Constance Demby.

Side one
No.	Title	Length
1.	"The Longing"	20:23

Side two
No.	Title	Length
1.	"Radiance"	20:35

== Personnel ==
Musical

- Constance Demby – hammered dulcimer, synthesizer, piano

Technical

- Recording & Engineering: Warren Dennis
- Additional engineering: Anna Turner
- Mixing: Stephen Hill
- Production: Constance Demby, Warren Dennis, Stephen Hill

Graphical

- Cover Illustration & Art direction: Constance Demby, Janaia Donaldson
