= Robert Rutman =

German artist and musician (1931–2021)

- Born: 15 May 1931; Berlin, Germany
- Died: 1 June 2021 (aged 90); Berlin, Germany
- Known for: sculpture, music, painting, etching
- Movement: sound art, contemporary classical music, industrial music, minimalism
- Website: www.rutman.de

Robert Rutman (15 May 1931 – 1 June 2021) was a German visual artist, musician, composer, and instrument builder. Best known for his work with homemade idiophones in his Steel Cello Ensemble, Rutman is regarded as a pioneer of multimedia performance in his mixing of music, sculpture, film, and visual art.

== Biography ==
=== Early life and career ===
Born in Berlin in 1931, Rutman's mother was a Jewish actress and his father a Bulgarian brownshirt who died in 1933. When the Nazis came to power, he and his mother fled Germany, moving to Warsaw in 1938 and then to Finland just before Hitler invaded Poland. By way of Sweden, Rutman arrived in England in 1939 where he attended refugee schools throughout the Second World War. After completing his studies, Rutman moved to New York City in 1950, then had to return to West Germany for military service in 1951.

In 1952 Rutman returned to the U.S. and worked as a traveling salesman in Dallas, Texas, before moving to Mexico City to enroll in art school. He married in Mexico, and the couple had a son, Eric. In 1962 Rutman returned to New York where he opened a gallery on West Broadway in Greenwich Village called "A Fly Can't Bird But A Bird Can Fly", which presented poetry, theater, music, and visual art as multimedia events. Rutman's collaborators included the Beat poet Philip Lamantia, who mentions Rutman in his poem, "The night is a space of white marble", and sculptor Constance Demby, with whom he made his first sound sculptures in 1966.

In 1967 Demby and Rutman held several happening-style events that mixed sonic, visual, and performance art centered around big sheets of metal that the artists had found. In one piece called The Thing, Rutman wore a white cardboard box and banged on Demby's sheet-metal creation with "a rock in a sock." In another piece entitled Space Mass, Rutman projected film upon a piece of curved sheetmetal onto which Demby had welded several steel rods that she played as a percussion instrument. Rutman later remarked, "We thought it would sound good as a xylophone, but it didn't." Rutman would later make adjustments to the sheet metal-and-rod contraption, converting it into a fully playable and tunable idiophone.

=== Central Maine Power Music Company ===
In 1967 Rutman moved to Skowhegan, Maine, where he built a house in the woods and established another multimedia gallery. Though this gallery sent him into bankruptcy within its four years of operation, it was here that Rutman created the instruments for which he became known. Rutman made these new instruments from large panels of flexible sheet metal affixed with steel strings or freely swinging rods that he played with a bass or cello bow. He named one of his creations the steel cello, and another the bow chimes, describing both as "American Industrial folk instruments".

In 1970 Rutman founded the Central Maine Power Music Company (CMPMC) as his first ensemble to play these sculptures. The CMPMC included Rutman and Demby, with locals Hugh Robbins, Richie Slamm, and Sally Hilmer, and hammer dulcimerist Dorothy Carter, plus occasional guests who all played Rutman and Demby's bowed sheet metal creations. Rutman's original concept for the group was to have it be made up entirely of handmade instruments, and the group featured a configuration of circular sawblades used as percussion. But according to Rutman, his invented instruments ended up serving more as decorations for their performances, as the other members of the group brought in traditional eastern and western instruments, such as drums, electronic organ, flute, koto, saxophone, tamboura, and yang chin, as well as electronic musical novelties, including the Moog synthesizer and theremin.

CMPMC performances had a ritualistic quality that incorporated many non-musicians, such as video artist Bill Etra who added visual elements to their shows. The band toured the East Coast, playing at several planetariums in Massachusetts, as well as Lincoln Center, the World Trade Center, and at the United Nations Sculpture Garden in New York. Rutman told a reporter in 1974:

The best way to describe our music is to call it "not music." You see, it often happens that when people hear us play, they say, either in anger or in delight, "That's not music!" It's somewhat akin to the paintings of Jackson Pollock. When the art buffs first saw his work, with the paint drippings and all, they said, "That's not painting."

=== Steel Cello Ensemble ===
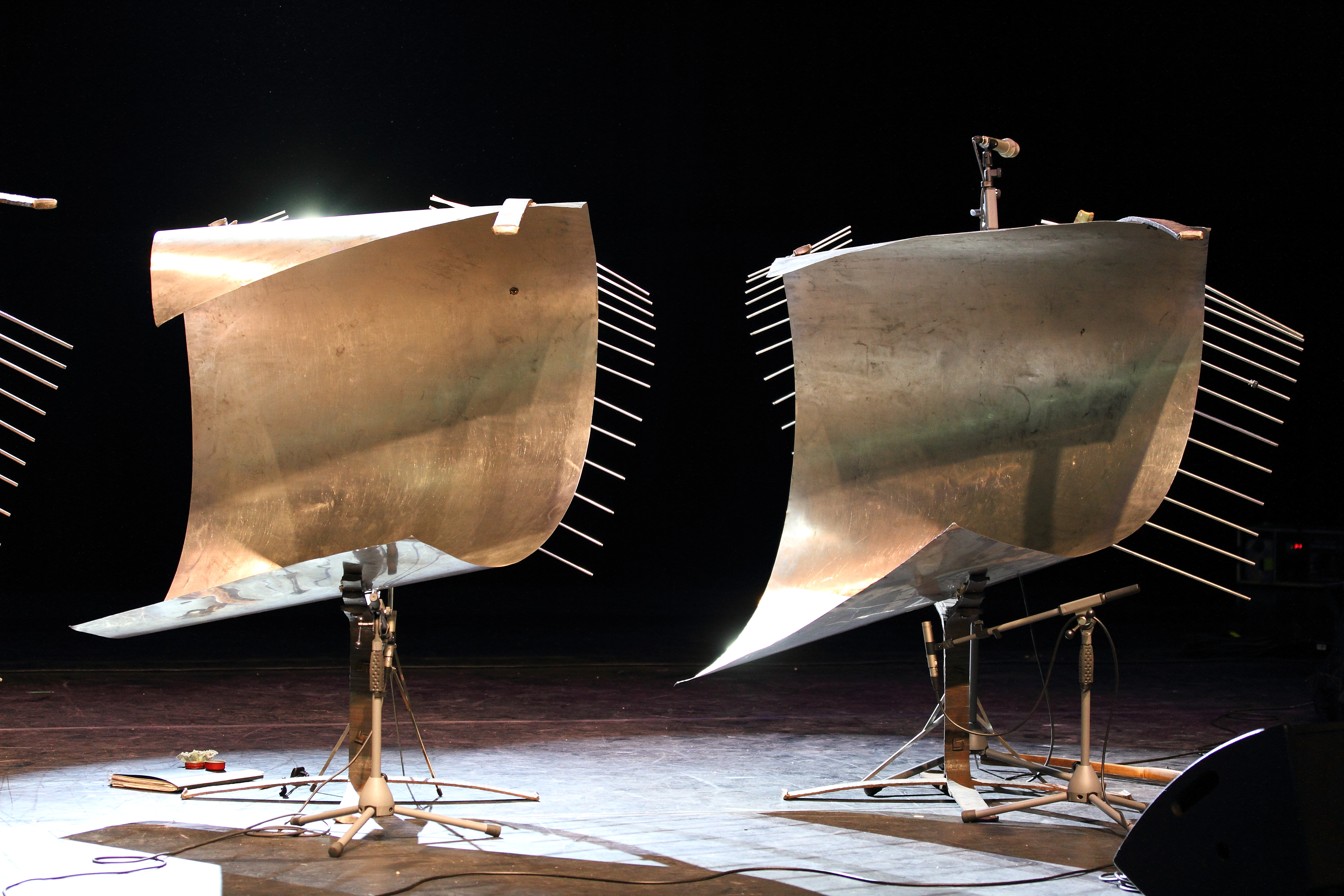
Steel cellos at the 2018 Rudolstadt Festival in Germany

As Rutman's instruments piqued the interest of aficionados in both visual art and new music composition, his portfolio as an exhibition and concert artist grew. As art pieces, the steel cello and bow chimes toured to galleries and museums where bows were on hand for anyone to play them. Though his instruments were tunable, Rutman had no formal musical training aside from sporadic childhood piano lessons. With neither conventional tuning principles nor systems of notation, it was through alternate means that he began teaching many people to play his instruments. He moved to Boston's then-bohemian Cambridgeport neighborhood and disbanded the CMPMC to found a new, all-steel music group in 1976: the Robert Rutman U.S. Steel Cello Ensemble, whose members included Suzanne Bresler, Rex Morrill, Warren Senders, Jim Van Denakker, and David Zaig. A 1977 press release described the group and its instruments:

The steel cello is 8ft tall and is made from a sheet of stainless steel anchored into a heavy iron stand. It supports one string, which when bowed creates a multitude of resonances, from delicate brittle sounds to deep rich tones. The bow chime, which is shorter, forms a horizontal curve which supports vertical rods, which when bowed produce complementary metallic tones. The Ensemble consists of one steel cello and three bow chimes and together create sounds equal in dynamics to an orchestra.

The Ensemble toured North America, often playing at science museums and art spaces, as well as concert venues. In 1977 they performed at Harvard University's Science Center and at New York's Museum of Modern Art. To further document and promote his work, Rutman founded his own label, Rutdog Records, on which he released albums by his Steel Cello Ensemble. Rutdog also released Dorothy Carter's psych-folk album Waillee Waillee, on which Rutman backs the hammer dulcimerist on his steel cello. Rutman and Carter continued to collaborate for decades thereafter. Rutman's instruments were borrowed by American jazz musician Sun Ra during his 1978 residency at the Modern Theater in Boston; Sun Ra (rather unsuccessfully) attempted to play both the Bow Chime and Steel Cello during the concerts.

In the 1980s Rutman and his instruments began scoring theatrical works by Euripides, Shakespeare, Coleridge, Rilke, Thoreau, and others. In 1980 the Steel Cello Ensemble performed for Peter Sellars' Harvard University stage production of King Lear, and in 1985 worked with Laurie Anderson on Robert Wilson's rendition of Alcestis at the American Repertory Theatre.

In 1986 Rutman was invited to play at the Palais des Beaux-Arts in Brussels, which opened the door to many performances and collaborations in Europe, spanning decades. On his first two tours of Europe, Rutman was joined by fellow American Daniel Orlansky, and the group later expanded to include two Germans, Alexander Dorsch and Stephanie Wolff. Dorsch created a double stringed steel cello which he named "Jericho", and Wollf complimented Rutman's "undertone" throat singing with "overtone" singing. The quartet of Rutman, Orlansky, Dorsch, and Wolff, was immortalized in the 1989 recording Noise in the Library, recorded live at Passionskirche in Berlin on May 31, 1989. Some of the prominent venues in the early "European Days" included the Museum of Modern Art in Stockholm, the America Haus in Munich, Haus der Kulturen der Welt in Berlin, the Berlin Atonal, London's Institute of Contemporary Arts, and Warsaw's Palace of Culture and Science. In 1989 Rutman threw himself a farewell party in Cambridge before relocating to his birth city of Berlin where he continued to live and work. In an interview shortly before leaving the U.S., Rutman shared his perspective on his instruments and music:

I see the music as the American industrial. They are the product of our society...indigenous American instruments. They really reflect the sounds of our society, and the engines and drones and stuff like that. The indigenous properties of the instruments have a western harmonic tonality, like a brass horn. They produce this brilliant, harmonic, metallic sound. It's what electronic instruments want to do and really can't in the way that the steel cellos can do. It creates the environment that's both ancient and futuristic at the same time. It spans this whole sense of space and future and past. That's what's inherent in the sound of the instrument.

=== Further developments ===
Over the years, Rutman developed an interest in Tibetan meditation and music. He spent five years teaching himself to throat sing in the style of Tibet's Buddhist monks and began to match his instruments' low tonalities with his voice. He also re-incorporated traditional non-western instruments into Steel Cello Ensemble performances and recordings, including the tabla, Tibetan horn, and didgeridoo.

Because of the steel cello's mass, Rutman developed lighter weight instruments for impromptu shows. First came the buzz chime, a triangular wooden drone instrument, which he added to his Steel Cello Ensemble. In the 1990s he satirized his own work by creating the styrophone, a handheld instrument that mimicked the appearance of his bow chimes, but instead of its five protruding brass rods being affixed to giant sheets of steel, they appeared as spindly wires stuck into handheld blocks of styrofoam. Unlike his sheet-metal instruments, which can last indefinitely, each Styrophone is destroyed by the process of playing it. Rutman told an interviewer in 2013:

The styrophone is the exact opposite to the bow chime and the steel cello, which make a very full sound. Instead, the styrophone is like Gänsehaut! It’s the opposite of beauty, it’s like really ugly and I like that.

Throughout the 1990s Rutman continued to score theatre and film, including Wim Wenders' sequel to Wings of Desire and Heiner Goebbels' stage adaptation of Walden. Rutman also toured and recorded with German industrial music group Einstürzende Neubauten.

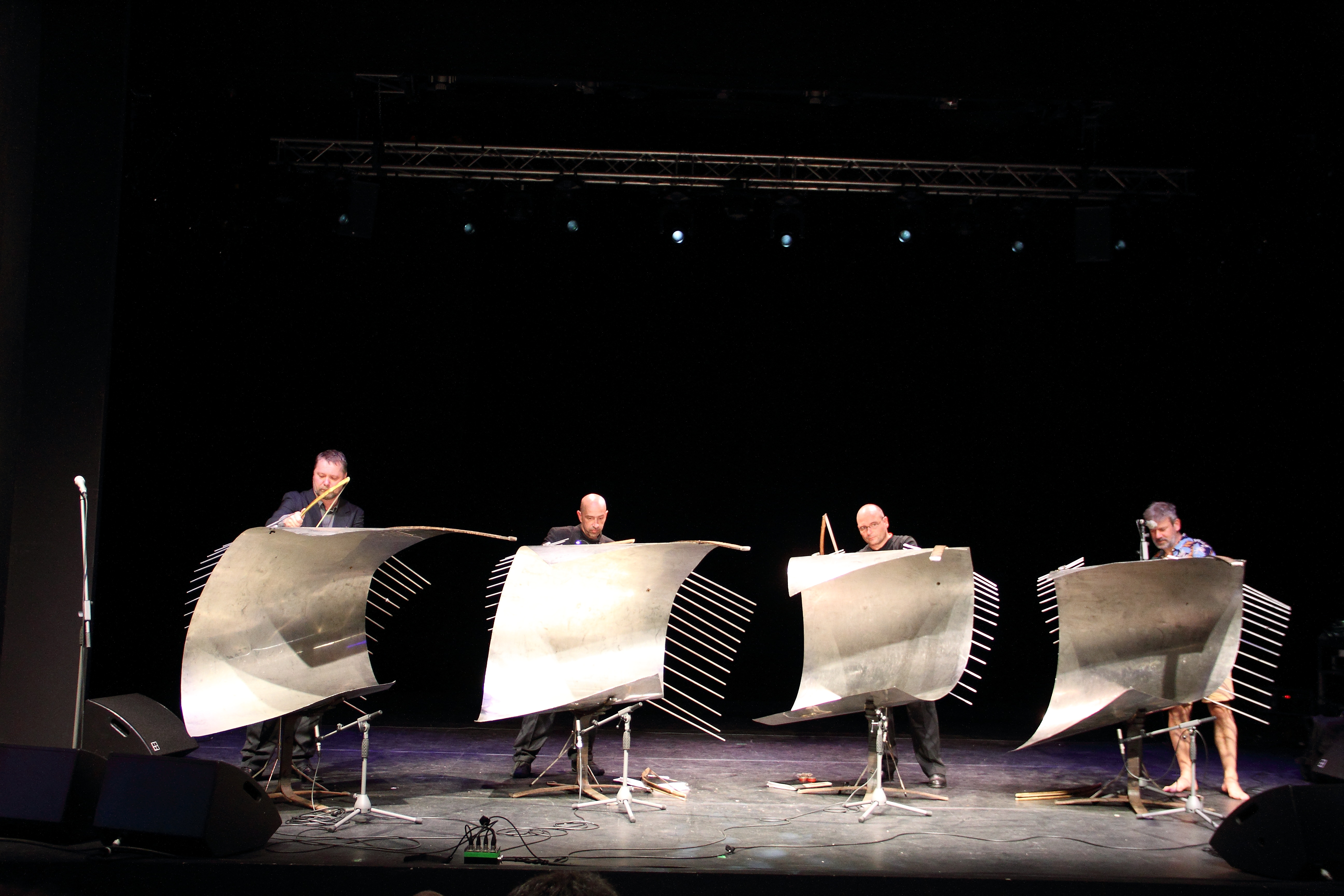
Dresden's Stahlquartett ("Steel Quartet") playing steel cellos at the 2018 Rudolstadt Festival

Rutman's training of other musicians has also spawned new generations of steel cellists and bow chimers, many of whom have gone on to compose and perform on the instruments. Among these are Klaus Wiese's Nono Orchestra, Wolfram Spyra and Pete Namlook as the duo Virtual Vices, Mathias Grassow and Adrian Palka. Other sculptor-musicians have designed and constructed their own variations of Rutman's instruments, such as the Dresden-based steel cello ensemble Stahlquartett.

Rutman's instruments are in the collection of the Smithsonian Institution. Instruments similar to Rutman's steel cello and bow chimes continued to appear in Constance Demby's work as "The Whale Sail" and "The Space Bass.” Since their parting in the early 1970s, Demby maintained that Rutman's instruments were adaptations of her own.

=== Visual art ===
In addition to his music and instruments, Rutman continued to produce and exhibit drawings, oil paintings, engravings and wire sculptures, examples of which can be seen on his website. His influence is in the work of Jackson Pollock and abstract impressionism, and he is best known for depicting landscapes, nude figures, Catholic themes, and chairs.

=== Death ===
Rutman died in a Berlin hospice facility on 1 June 2021 at age 90.

== Discography ==
=== Recordings listing Rutman or the Steel Cello Ensemble as primary artist ===
- Sound of Nothing (Art Supermarket Records LP, 1976)
- Bitter Suites (Rutdog Records LP, 1979; reissued by Holidays Records, 2013)
- Steel Cello Ensemble, Live in Europe (Rutdog Records cassette, 1987)
- 1940 (Generations Unlimited cassette, 1988)
- In A State Of Flux (A State of Flux cassette, 1988)
- Noise in the Library (Rutdog Records cassette, 1989)
- 1939 (Pogus Productions LP, 1989; CD with extra track, 1998)
- Live At The Waterworks, Berlin (Stuff Records CD, 1991)
- Big Waves (under the name Spacebow, with Carsten Tiedemann, Noteworks CD, 1995)
- Music To Sleep By (Tresor CD, 1997)
- Zuuhh!! Muttie Mum!! (Die Stadt CD, 1998)
- In A State of Flux (WCUW cassette, 1998)
- "Schritt Um Schritt"/"Buzz Off" (split single with Asmus Tietchens, Die Stadt 7", 1999)
- Eine Unbekannte Zeit: An Improvised Opera Performed Live In Bremen, Germany (Rutdog Records CD, 2003)
- Rutman, Ginsberg, Hentz, Irmler (Klangbad CD, 2011)
- Buzz Off (Peking Records CD, 2016)

=== Recordings as a guest musician ===
- On Dorothy Carter's albums Waillee Waillee (1978) and Lonesome Dove (2000), as well as many concerts
- On William Penn's album Crystal Rainbows, The Sounds Of Harmonious Craft (1978)
- On Geoff Bartley's album Interstates (1987)
- On Meret Becker's album Nachtmahr (1998)
- On Alexander Hacke's album Sanctuary (2005)
- On the Swans' album The Seer (2012)

== Other works ==
=== Filmography ===
Rutman's film appearances include:

- The Sun Goddess (Die Sonnengöttin), by Rudolf Thome (Germany, 1992)
- Faraway, So Close! (In weiter Ferne, so nah), by Wim Wenders (Germany, 1993)
- Räder müssen rollen – Fahrplanmäßig in den Tod (1994)
- Living on the Edge, by Luke McBain and Michael Weihrauch (Germany, 1995)
- Killer Condom (Kondom des Grauens), by Martin Walz (Germany, 1996)
- Stimmen der Welt (1997)
- Steel Cello / Bow Chime, by David Chapman and Adrian Palka (UK, 2004)
- Bob Rutman: Artist, Musician, Instrument Maker, by Ira Schneider (Germany, 2007)
- How Long Is Now, by Danielle de Picciotto (Germany, 2010)
- Lievalleen (2019)

=== Live musical collaborations ===
- Merce Cunningham's Dance Series (1969)
- Peter Sellars' stage adaptation of King Lear (1980), later made into a film by Jean-Luc Godard (1987)
- Robert Wilson's Alcestis at the American Repertory Theatre with music direction by Laurie Anderson (1986–87)
- Heiner Goebbels' adaptation of Walden (1998)
- Einstürzende Neubauten, 1998 U.S. tour

=== Art exhibitions ===
In addition to displaying his visual artwork at his own concerts, Rutman has had solo exhibitions all over the world.

- Houston (1959)
- Mexico City (1960)
- Boston (1962, 1978)
- New York City (1963, 1964, 1980, 1983, 1985)
- Berlin (1988, 1990, 1991)
- Barcelona (1990)
- Dresden (1995)

=== Publications ===
- Berlin um Mitternacht co-authored with Rüdiger Schaper (Berlin: Argon, 1998)
