= Styrophone =

Acoustic device

A styrophone is an acoustic device made from expanded polystyrene foam (often referred to by the genericized trademark Styrofoam). There are at least two varieties:

- an acoustic musical instrument
- a type of loudspeaker

== Musical instrument ==
The musical Styrophone is a type of friction idiophone created by Robert Rutman in the 1990s as a parody of his well-known sheetmetal instrument, the Bow Chimes. It consists of a foam box from which protrude a series of thin brass rods played with a violin bow. Rutman's ensemble would build the impromptu instruments prior to a performance, and then destroy them through the process of their use. Other versions have been created with wooden sticks used in place of metal.

== Styrophone loudspeaker ==
An inexpensive alternative to heavy-duty amplification systems, the Styrophone loudspeaker is usually of a cheap homemade variety that consists of a crystal earpiece attached to a cone made from a foam cup or sections of packing material.
