= M'Ocean =

M'Ocean [Light Play]

Studio album by Michael Stearns
- Released: 1984 [1983]
- Recorded: 1978–1982
- Genre: Ambient, new-age
- Length: 50:05
- Label: Sonic Atmospheres (1984), Earth Turtle (2000)

Michael Stearns chronology
Lyra (1983)	M'Ocean [Light Play] (1984)	Chronos (1984)

Professional ratings
Review scores
Source	Rating
AllMusic	4.5/5 stars

M'Ocean is an album of electronic ambient music by the U.S. musician Michael Stearns. It is a collection of seven pieces, either live performances or studio engineered tracks, produced between 1978 and 1982.

The album was given a first release under Michael Stearns' own label, Continuum Montage, in 1983, with the title Light Play. It was reissued as M'Ocean on CD the following year by Sonic Atmospheres, after Stearns signed to them. It has been reissued in 2000 along with much of Stearns' early works on his own label Earth Turtle.

== Overview ==
- "Sirens" was entirely composed on an Oberheim OB-8 synthesizer, one of the first digitally controlled analog synths. Stearns composed the piece just after having set up the synthesizer.
- "Marriage Chords" was composed for Stearns' wedding with Susan Harper in 1980. The piece is actually the live recording performed by Stearns for the ceremony on the Serge modular synthesizer.
- "M'Ocean" is a sequencer driven with whirling scales of notes that give a hint of the track escalators that would come up with the album Chronos. The title "M'Ocean" stands for "My Ocean" and "Motion".
- "Lightplay" is a more ambient track with massive and multi-layered chords.
- "Vicki's Dance" was performed and recorded live at the Continuum studio, during Emily Conrad's classes. It's en early Stearns' piece, that reminds previous works such as Ancient Leaves or Morning Jewel.
- "Fireflies Delight" is a sequencer driven track that sounds a bit like the track "M'Ocean".
- "Walking Song" is a short Igor Stravinsky piece that Stearns transcribed for the synthesizer.

== Track listing ==
1. "Sirens" – 5:04
2. "Marriage Chords" – 9:40
3. "M'Ocean" – 6:40
4. "Lightplay" – 7:11
5. "Vicki's Dance" – 5:25
6. "Fireflies' Delight" – 9:38
7. "Walking Song" – 2:21
