= Pray As You Go =

Jesuit prayer website and app

- Abbreviation: PAYG
- Founder: Peter Scally SJ
- Services: Prayer application
- Affiliations: Society of Jesus
- Website: pray-as-you-go.org

Pray As You Go is a daily prayer website, podcast and application that was created in 2006 by the Jesuits in the United Kingdom. Since its founding it has been adapted into nine other languages and as of 2020, it is used 30 million times a year.

== Format ==
Based on Ignatian spirituality, the website and its application has daily audio prayers that regularly use music, passages from the Bible and contemplations from the Spiritual Exercises, with reflective questions based on the examination of conscience. Later other prayers such as the rosary and Stations of the Cross were added.

== History ==
On 1 March 2006, Pray As You Go was launched. It was founded by Peter Scally who had previously worked on Sacred Space in Ireland and who went on to also found Thinking Faith, an online theology journal in 2008. An open, public trial began. However, after more than 250,000 prayer sessions were downloaded, it was decided to continue it indefinitely.

It started as a website and a podcast, where it could be downloaded and then listened to later, allowing people to be able to do it while commuting or travelling. By March 2008, over five million prayer sessions had been downloaded. On 6 April 2014, a Pray As You Go mobile application was launched. Before 2015, a Spanish version was created and called Rezando Voy. During Lent 2017, the French version, Prie en Chemin was launched, which after two years had 30,000 users. In 2019, in conjunction with Christian Life Community in Egypt, an Arabic version called Fi Tariqi Osally (on my way, I pray) was launched. In 2020, it was launched on Amazon Alexa.

As of 2020, it is available in over 180 countries and there is a version in Dutch called Bidden Onderweg, in Hungarian it is called Napi-útra-való, in Polish as Modlitwa w Drodze, Portuguese as Passo a Rezar, Ukrainian as iMolytva and Vietnamese as Phút cãu nguyên.

== See also ==
- Saint Ignatius of Loyola
- List of Jesuit sites in the United Kingdom
