= Mistletoe and Wine (album) =

Mistletoe and Wine: A Seasonal Collection

Compilation album by Mediæval Bæbes
- Released: 4 November 2003
- Recorded: 1997–2003
- Genre: Classical, Christmas
- Label: Nettwerk, EMI Classics
- Producer: Dawn Atkinson, Declan Colgan, Toby Wood

Mediæval Bæbes chronology
The Rose (2002)	Mistletoe and Wine: A Seasonal Collection (2003)	Mirabilis (2005)

Professional ratings
Review scores
Source	Rating
Allmusic	4/5 stars

Mistletoe and Wine: A Seasonal Collection is a compilation album by British vocal group Mediæval Bæbes featuring Christmas songs from previous albums, as well as two new recordings of "The Holly & The Ivy" and "In Dulce Jubilo".

== Track listing ==
1. The Holly & The Ivy
2. Gaudete
3. L'Amour De Moi
4. Salva Nos
5. Glass Window
6. There Is No Rose of Swych Vertu
7. Kinderly
8. In Dulce Jubilo
9. Love Me Broughte
10. I Am Eve
11. Quan Vey La Lauzeta
12. The Coventry Carol
13. Undrentide
14. Ecce Mundi Gaudium
15. Blow Northern Wind
