= Kiva (album) =

Studio album by Steve Roach, Michael Stearns and Ron Sunsinger
- Released: 1995
- Recorded: 1995
- Studio: Earth Turtle Studio in Santa Fe, New Mexico, Sunsinger Studio in Albuquerque, New Mexico and The Timeroom in Tucson, Arizona
- Genre: Ambient, space music
- Length: 67:15
- Label: Fathom/Hearts of Space Records
- Producer: Steve Roach, Michael Stearns and Ron Sunsinger

Steve Roach chronology
The Dreamer Descends (1995)	Kiva (1995)	Well of Souls (1995)

Michael Stearns chronology
The Lost World (1995)	Kiva (1995)	The Light in the Trees (1996)

Ron Sunsinger chronology
Singing Stones (1994)	Kiva (1995)	Sorcerer (2000)

Professional ratings
Review scores
Source	Rating
Allmusic	4/5 stars

Kiva is a collaborative album by the American ambient musicians Steve Roach, Michael Stearns and Ron Sunsinger. A kiva is an underground ceremonial chamber used by Native American cultures of the Southwest.

“East Kiva, ‘Calling in the Midnight Water” is a Peyote ceremony. “South Kiva, ‘Mother Ayahuasca” is an Ayahuasca ceremony from the South American rainforest. “West Kiva, ‘Sacrifice, Prayer and Visions” is a Sundance. The Sundance is an elaborate ceremony used by the tribes of the central plains to seek visions and initiate holy men. “North Kiva, ‘Trust and Remember” is a non-traditional improvisation created by the three artists in a cave in Northern New Mexico.

== Track listing ==
1. ”Passage One” (2:27)
2. ”East Kiva, ‘Calling in the Midnight Water” (13:42)
3. ”Passage Two” (1:59)
4. ”South Kiva, ‘Mother Ayahuasca” (15:13)
5. ”Passage Three” (2:12)
6. ”West Kiva, ‘Sacrifice, Prayer and Visions” (17:27)
7. ”Passage Four” (2:00)
8. ”North Kiva, ‘Trust and Remember” (9:42)
9. ”The Center” (2:33)
