= Polar Shift (album) =

Polar Shift: A Benefit for Antarctica

Compilation album by various artists
- Released: June 11, 1991
- Genre: New-age
- Length: 61:26
- Label: Private Music

Professional ratings
Review scores
Source	Rating
AllMusic	4.5/5 stars

Polar Shift: A Benefit for Antarctica is a compilation album of new-age and ambient music, released in 1991. A project of the EarthSea Institute, a portion of its proceeds was pledged "to The Cousteau Society and other environmental organizations working to establish Antarctica as a Natural Reserve dedicated to peace and science." It featured 13 tracks (3 original and 10 already-released) from various artists, being in CD track list order: Yanni, Chris Spheeris, Constance Demby, Steve Howe, Paul Smith, Vangelis, Enya, Kitaro, Suzanne Ciani, John Tesh, and Jim Chappell. The compilation was co-produced by Anna Turner and Terence Yallop, and was released by Private Music on cassette and CD. VOCALS SUNG BY "MONALISA YOUNG" (FEATURED VOCAlIST ON "SONG FOR ANTARCTICA" )

== Track listing ==
No.	Title	Writer(s)	Artist	Length
1.	"Theme from Antarctica"	Vangelis	Vangelis	7:27
2.	"Secret Vows"	Yanni	Yanni	3:57
3.	"Pura Vida"	Chris Spheeris, Paul Voudouris	Chris Spheeris & Paul Voudouris	3:49
4.	"Song for Antarctica"	Yanni	Yanni	4:23
5.	"Lullaby"	Jim Chappell	Jim Chappell	4:44
6.	"Watermark"	Enya, Nicky Ryan, Roma Ryan	Enya	2:24
7.	"Polar Flight"	Benoît Corboz, Paul Sutin	Steve Howe, Constance Demby, Paul Sutin	4:13
8.	"Day One"	John Tesh	John Tesh	5:11
9.	"Anthem"	Suzanne Ciani	Suzanne Ciani	3:54
10.	"Into Forever"	Constance Demby	Constance Demby	4:54
11.	"Antarctic Echoes"	Vangelis	Vangelis	5:55
12.	"Field of Tears"	Chris Spheeris	Chris Spheeris	3:08
13.	"Light of the Spirit"	Kitarō	Kitarō	7:27
