= Salva Nos (album) =

Studio album by Mediæval Bæbes
- Released: 17 November 1997
- Recorded: 1997
- Genre: Classical
- Length: 43:07
- Label: Virgin, Nettwerk
- Producer: Declan Colgan, Matthew Fisher

Mediæval Bæbes chronology
Salva Nos (1997)	Worldes Blysse (1998)

Professional ratings
Review scores
Source	Rating
Allmusic	2.5/5 stars

Salva Nos (Save Us) is the debut album by British vocal group Mediæval Bæbes.

== Reception ==
The album reached number two on the UK specialist classical album chart, and was certified silver by the BPI on 15 May 1998. More generally, the album spent eight weeks on the UK top 100 album chart, peaking at sixty-two.

== Track listing ==
1. Salve Virgo Virginum
2. Now Springes the Spray
3. Ah Si Mon Moine
4. Adam Lay Ibounden
5. Foweles in the Frith
6. So Treiben Wir Den Winter Aus
7. The Coventry Carol
8. Gaudete
9. Adult Lullaby
10. Veni, Veni
11. Salva Nos
12. Verbum Caro
13. Lo, Here My Hert
14. Binnorie O Binnorie
15. This Ay Nicht
16. Miri It Is
