= Baraka: Music from the Original Motion Picture Soundtrack =

Album by Michael Stearns

Baraka: Music From The Original Motion Picture Soundtrack

Soundtrack album by Michael Stearns
- Released: August 24, 1993
- Recorded: M'Ocean Studios. Marina Del Rey, California.
- Length: 47:23
- Label: Milan Records
- Producer: Michael Stearns

Professional ratings
Review scores
Source	Rating
SoundtrackNet	4.5/5 stars

Baraka was composed by Michael Stearns and was released on August 24, 1993, one year after the film opened for public viewing.

"Milan Records presents this digitally remastered special edition soundtrack to the 1992 cult classic docudrama, BARAKA. Scored by renowned new age composer Michael Stearns, BARAKA takes the listener on a world tour of cultural (and natural) experience. Displaying the cyclical nature of life, BARAKA moves through the mystery and fascination of natural phenomena to the serenity of Third World culture and, ultimately, the ferocity of industrialization. Stearns accents the film's theme with an array of world music influences, new age ambience, and a flair for incidental film scoring."

== Track listing ==
1. "Mantra / Organics" - 4:42
2. "Wipala" - 5:04
3. "The Host Of Seraphim" - 6:18
4. "Village Dance" - 2:55
5. "Wandering Saint" - 6:41
6. "African Journey" - 3:34
7. "Rainbow Voice" - 2:57
8. "Monk With Bell" - 2:33
9. "Broken Vows / A Prayer Of Kala Rupa / An Daorach Bheag" - 4:39
10. "Finale" - 4:34
11. "End Credits" - 3:26

== Baraka (Silver Screen Edition) ==
In 2005, though released in 1993, The Baraka Soundtrack was re-released to the public.

"This cult favorite soundtrack has been digitally remastered and now includes the opening theme of the film, which was not available on the original release. Composer Michael Stearns rediscovered the original recording after more than 10 years, and remastered it exclusively for this release."

Baraka (Silver Screen Edition)

Soundtrack album by Michael Stearns,
- Released: May 17, 2005
- Length: 53:48
- Label: Milan Records
- Producer: Michael Stearns

Professional ratings
Review scores
Source	Rating
SoundtrackNet	link

1. "Bonus Track: Opening / Nepal Morning" - Kōhachiro Miyata - 6:01
2. "Organics" - Somei Satoh - 4:45
3. "Wipala" - Inkuyo - 5:06
4. "The Host of Seraphim" - Dead Can Dance - 6:20
5. "Village Dance" - Michael Stearns - 2:58
6. "Varanasi Sunrise" - L. Subramaniam - 6:43
7. "African Journey" - Anugama & Sebastiano - 3:37
8. "Rainbow Voice" - David Hykes - 3:00
9. "Monk with Bell" - Michael Stearns - 2:37
10. "Broken Vow" - Monks of the Dip Tse Chok Ling Monastery, Dharamsala - 4:42
11. "Finale" - Michael Stearns - 4:34
12. "End Credits" - Michael Stearns - 3:25
