= Sacred Space (website) =

Website

- Website type: Prayer
- Available in: 21 languages
- List of languages العربية, Беларуская, Català, Česky, 简体中文, 正體中文, Dansk, Deutsch, English, Español, Français, Gaeilge, Italiano, Hrvatski, Magyar, Nederlands, Português, Русский, Slovenščina, Polski, Svenska.
- Headquarters: Milltown, Dublin, {{{location_country}}}
- Founder: Society of Jesus
- Key people: Alan McGuckian, Peter Scally
- Website: sacredspace.ie
- Users: 5,000,000+ annually
- Launched: 1999
- Current status: Active

Sacred Space is a prayer website that was founded in 1999. It was created by two members of the Jesuit order, Alan McGuckian and Peter Scally, and was managed by the Jesuit Communication Centre, Dublin, Ireland, until June 2008. The site is updated daily, guiding users through a ten-minute session of prayer centered on a passage of scripture.

== History ==
The notion of a website about prayer came to the two Jesuits when they were working in communications. McGuckian and Scally noticed that increasing numbers of office workers sit at a computer for hours every day, often doing repetitive work. They reasoned that people work better if they break that routine every now and again; and prayer is one way of breaking the routine. People as far away as the Arctic Circle and Australia log onto the site.

Speaking in The Tablet, Jan 18, 2003, Scally stated, "A person at the computer has a sense of privacy and intimacy; comfortable, upright, and attentive, subconsciously screening out all distractions, he concentrates on the screen -gazes in fact on that screen. What better description of the attitude of attentive listening to God?"

The appeal of the Internet for prayer is perhaps understandable, not only because it provides the user with the privacy needed for personal prayer, but also because the multi media approach to prayer, now offered by many websites makes prayer more stimulating than a mental exercise.

== Developments ==
Sacred Space attracts over five million visits annually. Most of this traffic has been engendered by word of mouth. The website has been produced in almost thirty languages over the site's lifetime. This level of interest led an Australian publishing house, Michelle Anderson Publishing, to approach the Jesuit Communication Centre about bringing out a hard-copy version of the daily prayers. Ave Maria Press, Veritas and Jesuit Communications in Manila, also bring out annual volumes of Sacred Space - The Prayer Book of which a Kindle edition is also available from Amazon. Advent and Lent editions have proven popular and have helped thousands of people to bring the simple yet helpful structure to their prayer.

According to Piaras Jackson, an Irish Jesuit priest who has been involved with the site for a number of years, only five percent of users are from Ireland. Of the English language section, most visitors are from the United States, Australia, Canada, and New Zealand. Jackson attributes the popularity of Sacred Space to the facts that it is immediately available 24/7, current with daily scripture readings; and allows anonymity, requiring no log-in. Last year alone its pages were viewed almost 30 million times from over 200 countries.

== See also ==
- Pray As You Go
