= Western Spaces =

Studio album by Steve Roach, Kevin Braheny and Richard Burmer
- Released: 1987, 1990
- Recorded: The Timeroom and Kevin Braheny's studio, Los Angeles
- Genre: Ambient
- Length: 68:51
- Label: Innovative Communications, Fortuna
- Producer: Steve Roach, Chuck Oken, Jr.

Steve Roach chronology
Quiet Music 3 (1986)	Western Spaces (1987)	The Leaving Time (1988)

Kevin Braheny chronology
Lullaby for the Hearts of Space (1980)	Western Spaces (1987)	Galaxies (1988)

Richard Burmer chronology
Bhakti Point (1987)	Western Spaces (1987)	On the Third Extreme (1988)

Alternative cover
- Innovative Communications release.

Professional ratings
Review scores
Source	Rating
Allmusic	4/5 stars
Q	favorable

Western Spaces is a collaborative album by the American ambient musicians Steve Roach and Kevin Braheny. This album is the first of Steve Roach’s many musical tributes to the Southwestern Desert.

On several tracks Kevin Braheny uses his trademark sound created by playing a cello preset on his Steiner EWI (Electronic Woodwind Instrument). This album was originally released on the Innovative Communications label by Chameleon Records as a Steve Roach/Kevin Braheny/Richard Burmer album and was released later the same year on the Fortuna label as a Steve Roach/Kevin Braheny album, with Burmer's solo contributions (“A Story from the Rain” and “Across the View”) replaced by two pieces from Roach.

The liner notes contain a poem by Roach's wife Linda Kohanov from which many of the song titles and perhaps the album title were derived.

== Track listings ==
=== Innovative Communications (Chameleon Records) ===
1. ”The Breathing Stone” (Roach) (6:46)
2. ”Desert Walkabout” (Braheny) (7:03)
3. ”A Story from the Rain” (Burmer) (7:08)
4. ”Desert Prayer” (Roach, Braheny) (12:33)
5. ”Across the View” (Burmer) (4:40)
6. ”In the Heat of Venus” (Roach, Brennan) (22:42)
7. ”Western Spaces” (Roach, Braheny, Burmer) (6:07)

=== Fortuna ===
1. "The Breathing Stone" (Roach) (6:46)
2. "Desert Walkabout" (Braheny) (7:03)
3. "New Moon at Forbidden Mesa" (Roach, Brennan) (5:40)
4. "Desert Prayer" (Roach, Braheny) (12:33)
5. "In the Heat of Venus" (Roach, Brennan) (22:33)
6. "The Slow Turning" (Roach) (7:40)
7. "Western Spaces" (Roach, Braheny, Burmer) (6:07)

== Personnel ==
- Steve Roach (Oberheim System with digital drums and Xpander, E-mu Emulator, Arp, Casio, Emulator II, Ensoniq ESQ-I)
- Kevin Braheny (Steiner EWI, The Mighty Serge Modular, Oberheim, Ensoniq ESQ-1 piano, panpipes, kalimba, bells)
- Thom Brennan (Oberheim Matrix-12 on “New Moon at Forbidden Mesa” and “In the Heat of Venus”)
- Richard Burmer (Emulator II on “Western Spaces”)
