= Amplexus (label) =

Italian record label

Amplexus was an Italian record label that was founded by Stefano Gentile that specialized in limited-edition mini CDs by notable ambient artists such as Steve Roach, vidnaObmana, Robert Rich, and Michael Stearns. It went out of business in 2003 and was replaced by Silentes.

== See also ==
- List of record labels
