= Worldes Blysse =

Studio album by Mediæval Bæbes
- Released: 19 October 1998
- Recorded: 1998
- Genre: Classical
- Length: 39:35
- Label: Virgin, Nettwerk
- Producer: Declan Colgan

Mediæval Bæbes chronology
Salva Nos (1997)	Worldes Blysse (1998)	Undrentide (2000)

Professional ratings
Review scores
Source	Rating
Allmusic	4/5 stars

Worldes Blysse is the second album by British vocal group Mediæval Bæbes, released 19 October 1998.

== Track listing ==
1. Kinderly
2. All Turns to Yesterday
3. Love Me Broughte
4. Beatrice
5. Ecci Mundi Gaudium
6. Waylaway
7. Alba
8. When Thy Turuf Is Thy Tour
9. Erthe Upon Erthe
10. Passing Thus Alone
11. La Volta
12. Pearl
13. Swete Sone
14. So Spricht das Leben
15. C'est la fin
16. How Death Comes
