= Encounter (Michael Stearns album) =

Studio album by Michael Stearns
- Released: 1988
- Genre: Space, ambient, new-age
- Label: Hearts of Space Records

Michael Stearns chronology
Floating Whispers (1987)	Encounter (1988)	Sacred Site (1993)

Professional ratings
Review scores
Source	Rating
Allmusic	4.5/5 stars

Encounter is an album by Michael Stearns, released in 1988.

Subtitled: A Journey in the Key of Space, it is a collection of instrumental pieces, weaving synthesizers and various background sounds. It evokes peaceful landscapes, feelings of a summer night, space and an encounter with a UFO.

== Track listing ==
1. "Encounter: Awaiting the Other" – 3:29
2. "Craft: Dimensional Release" – 6:29
3. "The Beacon: Those Who Have Gone Before" – 7:01
4. "On the Way: Space Caravan" – 3:48
5. "Dimensional Shift: Across the Threshold" – 5:29
6. "Within: Choir of the Ascending Spirit" – 3:53
7. "Distant Thunder: Solitary Witness" – 5:40
8. "Alien Shore: Starlight Bay" – 3:46
9. "Procession: Sacred Ceremony" – 8:55
10. "Star Dreams: Peace Eternal" – 4:06
