= Emerald Tablets of Thoth the Atlantean =

20th-century pseudohistorical book

- Author: Maurice Doreal
- Genre: Pseudohistory
- Publication date: 1940s/early 1950s

The Emerald Tablets of Thoth the Atlantean is a pseudohistorical book written by Maurice Doreal (1898–1963) and first published in the 1940s or early 1950s. Influenced by ancient Egyptian texts and Lovecraftian stories about part-reptilian civilizations emerging from ancient Egypt-like ruins, it deals with Atlantis, an ancient race of serpent-headed men, alchemy, and a variety of other topics.

== Background ==
The book Emerald Tablets of Thoth the Atlantean was authored in the wake of the Theosophical movement and the rising popularity of the fictional tales of H. P. Lovecraft (1890–1937). Written by Maurice Doreal, who in 1930 had founded the cult Brotherhood of the White Temple, it was published in the 1940s or early 1950s, most likely before 1953.

Works that had inspired Doreal in particular were The Dunwich Horror (1928) and Hounds of Tindalos (1929), as well as two fabled occult Egyptian texts, the Emerald Tablet and the Book of Thoth.

== Contents ==
Doreal claimed that the text of the Emerald Tablets of Thoth the Atlantean is the translation of a set of tablets he found in the Great Pyramid of Giza in 1925.

The book consists of 15 tablet-chapters, each consisting of cryptic poems that cover a variety of topics, including alchemy, spirituality, the nature of the universe, Atlantis and philosophy.

1. The History of Thoth, The Atlantean
2. The Halls of Amenti
3. The Key of Wisdom
4. The Space Born
5. The Dweller of Unal
6. The Key of Magic
7. The Seven Lords
8. The Key of Mysteries
9. The Key of Freedom of Space
10. The Key of Time
11. The Key to Above and Below
12. The Law of Cause and Effect and The Key of Prophecy
13. The Keys of Life and Death
14. Atlantis
15. Secret of Secrets

== Influence ==
Doreal's work was extensively used by David Icke, a promoter of the Reptilian conspiracy theory.
