= Kevin Braheny Fortune =

American musician

- Born: Kevin Braheny; 1952 (age 73–74)
- Occupations: Musician and composer

Kevin Braheny Fortune (born Kevin Braheny, 1952) is an American musician and composer of ambient music, producer, engineer, and session musician.

== Biography ==
Braheny was on the early design team of the Serge synthesizer, a company building modular synthesizers. He was also the chief engineer at Sound Transform Systems headed by Rex Probe. In 1977, he built his highly customized Mighty Serge, a 15-panel system that he would use on his own albums. He also built a system for Craig Huxley that he then sold to Michael Stearns, who Braheny taught how to play and customize it.

Braheny recorded the track "Perelandra" (later known as "Perelandra Dawn") in early 1978, which created a strong response following several years of broadcast on Stephen Hill's radio show Hearts of Space on KPFA-FM. After Hill suggested to Braheny that he release it on an album Braheny recorded a second piece, "The Way Home", to accompany it, while making alterations to "Perelandra" to create a second version of the track. The album was released in 1984 as the debut record on Hill's label Hearts of Space Records, named Perelandra, and since reissued as The Way Home. In 1980, following encouragement from Stearns and Hill, Braheny set up his own record label and released his second album, Lullaby for the Hearts of Space. The 35-minute title track was an improvised live performance on Hill's show in March of that year. The second piece, "After I Said Goodnight", was played live at a class hosted by Emilie Conrad, founder of the Continuum Movement. It features sounds of crickets, bells, a jungle atmosphere, tape loops of his own voice, and a saxophone. In the mid-1980s, Braheny was approached by science author and educator Timothy Ferris to compose the soundtrack for a planetarium show called Galaxies that was based on his same-titled book. He recorded it using Richard Burmer's home studio, and although he resisted putting it out as a standalone album because of its undeveloped nature, he eventually released it as Galaxies in 1988. Braheny's following album, Secret Rooms, was inspired by his experiences of spirits talking through him, "musically and then verbally", and became a "trance-channel" medium. Two tracks recorded for the album were rejected by his label.

Braheny also built the electronic wind instrument EWI (pronounced "ee-wee") for Nyle Steiner, and plays the instrument on Western Spaces (1987).

Around 1991, Braheny relocated from Los Angeles to San Francisco. In the following year he became ill with an autoimmune disease and, coupled with "six or seven life stresses" going on at the same time, led him to pause his music career and moved to the northern mountains. Following the release of The Spell with Tim Clark in 1996, Braheny would not release music for another 22 years. During this time he worked as a therapist specialising in sexual healing, often working with survivors of sexual abuse. He returned to music in 2018.

Around 1977, Braheny began a parallel career in the healing arts. In 2006, he had been teaching Tantra both privately and in groups for around 18 years.

== Discography ==
- Lullaby for the Hearts of Space (1980)
- Perelandra (1984; later reissued as The Way Home)
- Western Spaces (1987; with Steve Roach and Richard Burmer)
- Galaxies (1988)
- Desert Solitaire (1989; with Steve Roach and Michael Stearns)
- Secret Rooms (1990)
- Rain (1995, with Tim Clark)
- The Spell (1996, with Tim Clark)
- Liminal Space (2019)
