= Mediæval Bæbes =

British musical ensemble

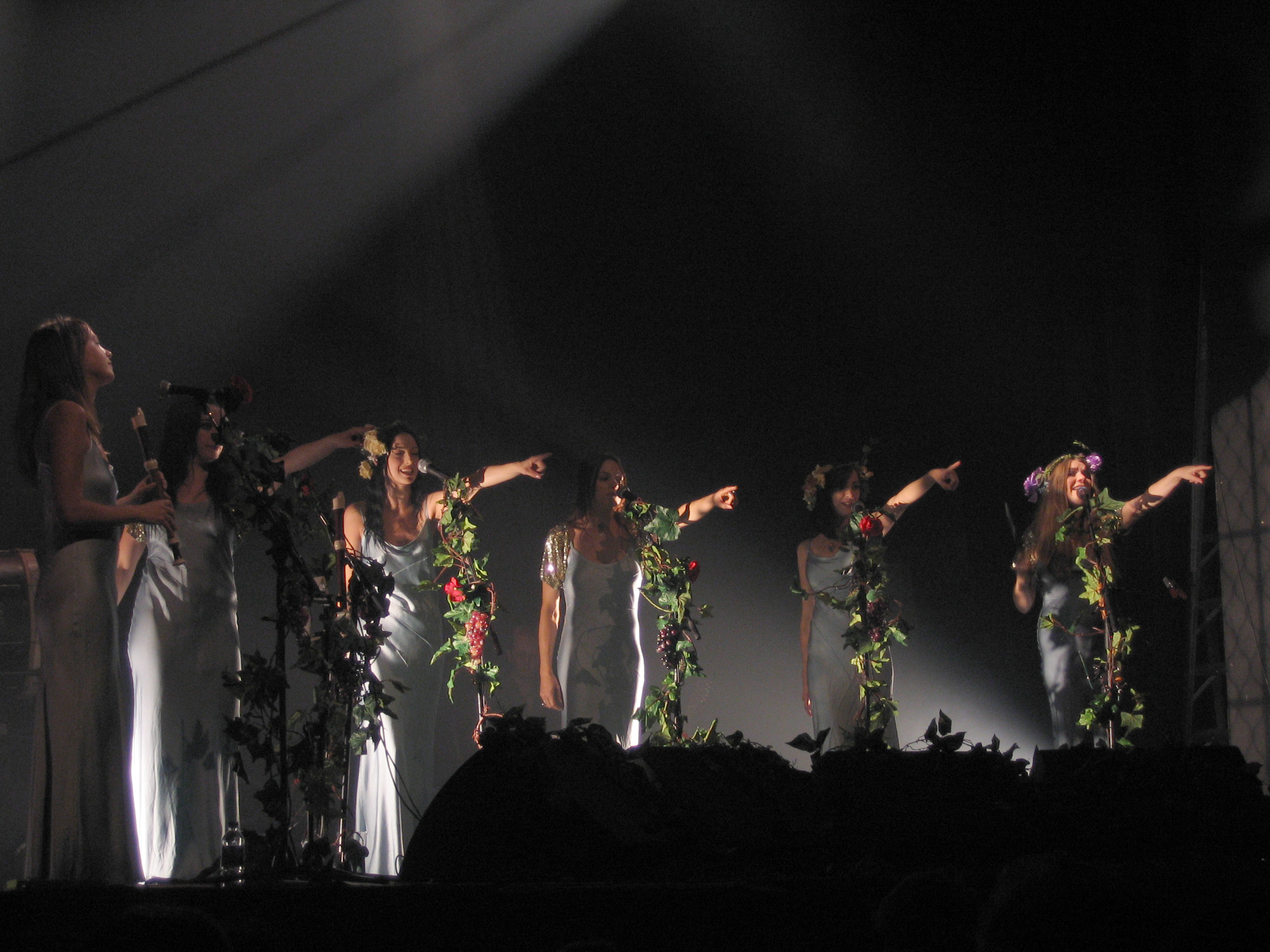

Background information
- Origin: England
- Genres: Early music, traditional, a cappella
- Years active: 1996–present
- Labels: Nettwerk, Venture/Virgin/EMI
- Members: Katharine Blake; Marie Findley; Fiona Fey; Maya McCourt; Josephine Ravenheart; Sophia Halberstam
- Past members: List of past members: Dorothy Carter; Teresa Casella; Sophie Evans; Rebecca Golant; Nicole Frobusch; Ruth Galloway; Vince Johnson; Karen Lupton; Camilla Hinsby; Carmen Schneider; Nichole Sleet; Rachel Van Asch; Audrey Evans; Cylindra Sapphire; Helen Haywood-Eve; Melanie Garside; Claire Ravel; Maxine Fone; Sofia Escobar; Claire Rabbitt; Bev Lee Harling; Tania Jackson; Jo Burke; Sarah Foster; Esther Dee; Emily Ovenden; Anna Tam; Melpomeni Kermanidou; Clare Edmondson; Kathleen Ross; Sophie Ramsey; Anna Pool
- Website: mediaevalbaebes.com

The Mediæval Bæbes are a British musical ensemble founded in 1996 by Dorothy Carter and Katharine Blake. It included some of Blake's colleagues from the band Miranda Sex Garden, as well as other friends who shared her love of medieval music. The lineup often rotates from album to album, and ranges from six to twelve members. As of 2010, the group had sold some 500,000 records worldwide, their most successful being Worldes Blysse with 250,000 copies purchased.

== Music ==
The Bæbes' first album, Salva Nos (1997), reached number two on the UK specialist classical charts, and was certified silver on 15 May 1998. Subsequent albums include Worldes Blysse (which went to No. 1), Undrentide, (co-produced by John Cale), The Rose, (produced by Toby Wood), and the Christmas-themed album Mistletoe and Wine.

Mirabilis (2005) was launched at a concert and party in London, August 2005. A self-titled DVD was released in July 2006. The first 300 preorders were autographed by the band and received a special mention in the DVD credits.

A live album was released on 25 November 2006 and features two new studio tracks.

Each album features traditional medieval songs and poetry set to music, mostly arranged by Blake specifically for the ensemble, alongside varying numbers of original compositions. They sing in a variety of languages, including Latin, Middle English, French, Italian, Russian, Swedish, Scottish English, German, Manx Gaelic, Spanish, Welsh, Bavarian, Provençal, Irish, modern English and Cornish. Their vocals are backed by medieval instruments, including the recorder and cittern, played by the singers or fellow musicians.

The Bæbes' musical pieces run the gamut from extremely traditional, such as their version of the "Coventry Carol" on Salva Nos, to songs that feel traditional but are much more modern, such as their rendition of "Summerisle", a song written for Robin Hardy's 1973 cult film, The Wicker Man. John Cale added non-medieval instruments, including saxophone and electric guitar, to some of the arrangements on Undrentide, although with subsequent albums the band returned to more traditional instruments. Even with these instruments, however, the band's current style is quite different from medieval authentic performance groups, as it displays significant modern influence - this juxtaposition is apparent in the album Illumination (2009) produced by KK (Kevin Kerrigan).

== Collaborations ==
In 2005, the Bæbes contributed Mediæval Bæbes music to the soundtrack of the BBC period drama The Virgin Queen, which portrays the life of Elizabeth I of England, including the title music, which is a poem written by Elizabeth set to music by Blake.

The Bæbes provided the vocal track for and starred in the video of the Delerium track "Aria"; the vocals are an adapted version of the vocals from "All Turns to Yesterday" from Worldes Blysse. They are also featured on two tracks from Delerium's 2006 album, Nuages du Monde: "Extollere" and "Sister Sojourn Ghost".

In 2016, the group performed the theme song to the ITV TV series Victoria, performing the composition by Martin Phipps.

In 2023, the Baebes collaborated with Orbital on the latter's single "Ringa Ringa", a version of the children's rhyme "Ring a Ring o' Roses" referencing the COVID pandemic. The song appeared on Orbital's album Optical Delusion which was released on 17 February 2023.

== Members ==
On 19 December 2016, the Mediæval Bæbes performed a concert at the Tabernacle, Notting Hill in London to celebrate their 20th anniversary as a band. Seventeen of the past and present members were reunited on stage for a few songs.

In 2017, Sophia Halberstam joined as a high soprano vocalist.

Member Maple Bee (aka Melanie Garside) is the singer in electronic duo Huski and the younger sister of KatieJane Garside, singer of London-based rock band Queenadreena.

=== Former members ===
One of the group's founding musicians, Dorothy Carter, died of a stroke in 2003 at the age of 68. In addition to playing autoharp, hurdy-gurdy, and dulcimer with the group, she performed the lead vocals on "So Spricht Das Leben" (Worldes Blysse) and "L'Amour de Moi" (The Rose).

Emily Ovenden left the group at the beginning of 2016. She is the daughter of artists Graham Ovenden and Annie Ovenden. She was born and raised in Cornwall and now lives in London. She performed backing vocals on DragonForce's The Power Within and Reaching into Infinity. She is also a founding member and former lead vocalist of English gothic metal band Pythia.

Marie Findley left the group in March 2007. She is also a film reviewer and television script writer for programmes such as Smack the Pony and The Ant & Dec Show. She was the lead (using the name Tulip Junkie) in the Ken Russell film The Fall of the Louse of Usher.

16 May 2007 – Audrey Evans and Maple Bee resigned due to family and professional commitments and Cylindra Sapphire resigned in order to follow a different musical path.

22 July 2009 – Claire Rabbitt left the Bæbes. Sarah Kayte Foster came on to replace her.

== Discography ==
=== Studio ===
- 1997 Salva Nos
- 1998 Worldes Blysse
- 2000 Undrentide
- 2002 The Rose
- 2005 Mirabilis
- 2008 Illumination
- 2012 The Huntress
- 2013 Of Kings and Angels
- 2019 A Pocketful of Posies
- 2020 Prayers of the Rosary
- 2022 Mydwynter
- 2025 The Spinning Wheel

=== Live ===
- 2006 Live (includes two new studio tracks; sold only on the official website and at concerts)
- 2010 Temptation

=== Compilations and soundtracks ===
- 1999 The Best of the Mediæval Bæbes (this title is absent from the Mediæval Bæbes' website, and they comment that Mistletoe and Wine is 'the only compilation endorsed by the Mediæval Bæbes')
- 2003 Mistletoe and Wine (a collection of Christmas-related music from previous albums, plus two new songs and two re-recorded songs)
- 2006 The Virgin Queen - Music from the Original Television Series (soundtrack album by Martin Phipps, featuring Mediæval Bæbes)
- 2012 Devotion (a collection of devotional tracks from previous albums remixed and remastered, plus one new song; sold only on the official website and at concerts)
- 2017 Victoria (soundtrack album by Martin Phipps and Ruth Barrett, featuring Mediæval Bæbes; digital-only release)
- 2017 "Victoriana"

=== Video ===
- 2000 Live at The Rehearsal Hall (VHS)
- 2006 Mediæval Bæbes (DVD)
- 2009 Live at Gloucester Cathedral (DVD)
- 2015 In Concert At Berkeley Castle (DVD)
