= Maurice Doreal =

American occultist and conspiracy theorist

Maurice Doreal (1898–1963) was the religious name of Claude D. Dodgin (1902–1963). He was an American occultist and founder of the Brotherhood of the White Temple.

According to contemporary records, he was born in Oklahoma and later lived in Kansas before founding the Brotherhood of the White Temple. Doreal claimed that during a 1925 visit to the Great Pyramids of Giza, he discovered a set of ancient emerald tablets belonging to the Egyptian deity Thoth, whom he re-imagined as a king of Atlantis. Doreal then claimed to have translated the text, which he published as the Emerald Tablets of Thoth the Atlantean (not to be confused with the medieval Hermetic text called the Emerald Tablet).

== Occult views ==
In around 1930, Maurice Doreal formed the Brotherhood of the White Temple in Denver, having been involved in Theosophy. He claimed that in 1931, in Los Angeles, he met two Atlanteans who took him to a cave underneath Mount Shasta. Doreal quickly developed a cosmology focused on the inner earth, describing "underground races" he claimed to have learned about from the Atlanteans. Doreal developed theories of an underground serpent race.

Doreal sent a letter to the Amazing Stories science fiction magazine in 1946, claiming to have personally experienced underground worlds as initially reported by Richard Sharpe Shaver.

During the 1950s, Doreal incorporated aliens into his views. He combined these all into a theory that in the second half of the 20th century, the serpent race would ally with the Antichrist. He believed that there were "three types of flying saucers including one piloted by 'serpent people' who were once ice-bound in Siberia, became defrosted and then replaced and overthrew the Communist regime in Russia".

In the late 1940s and early 1950s, Doreal relocated the Brotherhood near Sedalia, Colorado, where he predicted that nuclear war would happen in 1953, but that he and his community would be protected by the mountains in the valley they relocated to. He died in 1963.
