= Stephen Hill (broadcaster) =

American radio producer

Stephen Hill is an American producer, creator and host of the long-running Hearts of Space radio program, which features "contemporary space music" from a variety of musicians and genres. He has helped popularize the term "space music" during his tenure on the show and is an advocate for contemplative music regardless of source or genre.

== Biography ==
Hill created Music from the Hearts of Space in 1973 as a weekly three-hour local radio program on Pacifica station KPFA-FM in Berkeley, California. National syndication of a one-hour version of the program began in 1983 and grew to a network of over 290 NPR affiliate stations. Hill and original partner Anna Turner then launched Hearts of Space Records in 1984. After about 150 releases, the label was sold to Valley Entertainment in 2001. Hill has produced thousands of live and recorded radio broadcasts and dozens of record albums and soundtracks, including an Academy Award-winning feature-length documentary film. In addition to hosting and directing the production of the radio program, Hill handled Artist & Repertoire for the record labels, served as in-house Art Director for graphics, print and online promotion. He is currently immersed in work on the Hearts of Space Archive — a next-generation Internet service for contemplative music.
