= Humidity (album) =

Live album by Robert Rich
- Released: 2000
- Recorded: April 2, 1998 at KZSU, Stanford University, May 9, 1998 at Beyond Baroque in Venice, California and May 10, 1998 at Moby Disc in Pasadena, California
- Genre: Ambient, world fusion, electronic
- Length: 182:05
- Label: Hypnos
- Producer: Robert Rich

Robert Rich chronology
| Seven Veils (1998) | Humidity (2000) | Somnium (2001) |

Professional ratings
Review scores
| Source | Rating |
|---|---|
| Allmusic | link |

Humidity (2000) is an album by the American ambient musician Robert Rich. It is a three disc set of live material recorded in 1998.

Disc one was recorded on April 2, 1998 at Stanford University’s KZSU radio station as part of their annual Day of Noise event. Disc two was recorded on May 9, 1998 at the Beyond Music Sound Festival in Venice, California. Disc three was recorded on May 10, 1998 during an in-store concert at the Moby Disc in Pasadena, California.

The composition for track two of disc one was originally released on the 1993 multi-artist compilation DeepNet. Track four of disc one and track five of disc three were co-composed with Brian “Lustmord” Williams and were originally released on Rich and Lustmord's 1995 collaboration Stalker. Track two of disc three was originally composed for Rich's 1994 collaboration with Lisa Moskow, Yearning. Track four of disc three is a reworking of Rich's 1994 release Night Sky Replies. All other material on this album was improvised.

== Track listing ==
=== Disc one ===
1. ”Lost Caverns of Caryatis” – 12:55
2. ”Bioelectric Plasma” – 7:33
3. ”Demilitarized Zone” – 14:16
4. ”Synergistic Perceptions” – 10:52
5. ”Ceramic Tincture” – 6:28
6. ”Submission to Pele” – 7:22
7. ”Humidity Toward the Troposphere” – 14:25

=== Disc two ===
1. ”Beyond Part 1” – 16:26
2. ”Beyond Part 2” – 6:43
3. ”Beyond Part 3” – 6:52
4. ”Beyond Part 4” – 6:13
5. ”Beyond Part 5” – 3:51
6. ”Beyond Part 6” – 7:14

=== Disc three ===
1. ”Steel Harmonics” – 7:45
2. ”Nada” – 6:05
3. ”Cloud Relapse” – 7:04
4. ”Nightsky Reprise” – 16:56
5. ”Hidden Refuge” – 9:02
6. ”In a Miasma of Malarial Delusions” – 15:51
