= Hearts of Space Records =

Record label

- Parent company: Valley Entertainment
- Founded: 1984
- Founder: Stephen Hill, Anna Turner
- Distributor(s): RED Distribution / Alternative Distribution Alliance
- Genre: New-age, space, ambient, electronic
- Country of origin: U.S.
- Location: San Francisco, California
- Official website: www.valley-entertainment.com

Hearts of Space Records is a record label owned by Valley Entertainment. The label represents several sublabels, including Hearts of Space, Hearts O'Space, Fathom, RGB, and World Class.

== History ==
Hearts of Space Records was founded in 1984 as an outlet for music from the weekly radio show Hearts of Space. The label has released mainly contemplative music, but also features ambient, new-age, electronic, world, Celtic, classical, and experimental recordings.

== Discography ==
Selection Number	Artist	Album
HS 11001	Kevin Braheny	Perelandra (later reissued as The Way Home)
HS 11002	Kevin Braheny	Lullaby for the Hearts of Space (original pressing)
HS 11003	Constance Demby	Novus Magnificat: Through the Stargate
HS 11004	Kevin Braheny	Galaxies
HS 11005	Raphael	Music to Disappear In
HS 11006	Bill Douglas	Jewel Lake
HS 11007	Shiho	Purple Sails
HS 11008	Michael Stearns	Encounter
HS 11009	Ken Stover	Sir Dancelot's Dream
HS 11010	Constance Demby	Sacred Space Music
HS 11011	David Lange	Return of the Comet
HS 11012	Steve McDonald	Spinfield
HS 11014	Robert Rich	Rainforest
HS 11015	Kevin Braheny	Secret Rooms
HS 11016	Constance Demby	Set Free
HS 11017	Tim Clark	Tales of the Sun People
HS 11018	Nik Tyndall	Lagoon
HS 11019	Steve Roach and Robert Rich	Strata
HS 11020	Al Gromer Khan	Mahogany Nights
HS 11021	Bill Douglas	Cantilena
HS 11022	Coyote Oldman	Thunder Chord
HS 11023	Raphael	Music to Disappear In, Volume 2
HS 11024	Sahan Arzruni	Visionary Landscapes: Music of Alan Hovhaness
HS 11026	Mychael Danna	Sirens
HS 11027	Tim Story	Beguiled
HS 11028	Robert Rich	Gaudí
HS 11029	Paul Avgerinos	Muse of the Round Sky
HS 11030	Giles Reaves	Sea of Glass
HS 11031	John Boswell	Festival of the Heart
HS 11032	Mychael Danna	Skys
HS 11033	Steve Roach and Robert Rich	Soma
HS 11034	Suspended Memories	Forgotten Gods
HS 11035	Bill Douglas	Kaleidoscope
HS 11036	John Boswell	Count Me In
HS 11037	David Darling	Eight-String Religion
HS 11038	Michael Stearns	Sacred Site
HS 11039	Zeus Faber	Scubason
HS 11040	Robert Rich	Propagation
HS 11041	John Boswell	The Painter
HS 11042	Michael Stearns and Ron Sunsinger	Singing Stones
HS 11043	Suspended Memories	Earth Island
HS 11044	Lightwave	Tycho Brahe
HS 11045	Tim Story	The Perfect Flaw
HS 11046	Kenneth Newby	Ecology of Souls
HS 11047	Raphael	Angels of the Deep
HS 11048	Bill Douglas	Circle of Moons
HS 11049	Mychael Danna and Tim Clément	North of Niagara
HS 11050	Robert Rich and Lisa Moskow	Yearning
HS 11051	Constance Demby	Aeterna
HS 11052	Kevin Braheny and Tim Clark	Rain
HS 11053	John Boswell	Kindred Spirits
HS 11054	Michael Stearns	The Lost World
HS 11055	John Doan	Wrapped in White
HS 11056	Michael Stearns, Ron Sunsinger and Steve Roach	Kiva
HS 11057	Paul Sauvanet	Tristesse
HS 11058	Lightwave	Mundus Subterraneus
HS 11059	Robert Rich & B. Lustmord	Stalker
HS 11060	Joanie Madden	Song of the Irish Whistle
HS 11061	Al Gromer Khan and Kai Taschner	Black Marble and Sweet Fire
HS 11062	Steve Roach	The Magnificent Void
HS 11063	Jeff Danna and Mychael Danna	A Celtic Tale: The Legend of Deirdre
HS 11064	Zeus Faber	Below
HS 11065	Kevin Braheny and Tim Clark	The Spell
HS 11066	Tim Story	Abridged
HS 11067	Robert Rich	A Troubled Resting Place
HS 11068	Michael Stearns	Collected Ambient & Textural Works (1977–1987)
HS 11069	Michael Stearns	Collected Thematic Works (1977–1987)
HS 11070	Bill Douglas	Deep Peace
HS 11071	Michael Whalen	Nightscenes
HS 11072	Steve Roach and Stephen Kent	Halcyon Days
HS 11073	Jeff Danna and Mychael Danna	A Celtic Tale: The Legend of Deirdre (Narrated)
HS 11074	Coyote Oldman	In Beauty I Walk
HS 11075	Raphael	Intimacy
HS 11076	Robert Rich and Alio Die	Fissures
HS 11077	Robert Rich	Numena + Geometry
HS 11078	TUU	Mesh
HS 11079	Paul Sauvanet	Nomad
HS 11080	John Doan	Eire: Isle of the Saints
HS 11081	Oystein Sevag	Bridge
HS 11082	Steve Roach	On This Planet
HS 11083	Bill Douglas	Songs of Earth & Sky
HS 11084	Mychael Danna & Jeff Danna	A Celtic Romance
HS 11085	John Boswell	Trust
HS 11086	Robert Rich	Seven Veils
HS 11087	Nick Parkin & TUU	Terma
HS 11088	Jeff Johnson	Prayers of St. Brendan: The Journey Home
HS 11089	Blue Chip Orchestra	Red Sky Beat
HS 11090	Joanie Madden	Song of the Irish Whistle, Volume 2
HS 11091	Michael Hoppe, Martin Tillman and Tim Wheater	Afterglow
HS 11092	Bill Douglas	Earth Prayer
HS 11093	Coyote Oldman	House Made of Dawn
HS 11094	Steve Roach	Light Fantastic
HS 11095	John Doan	Wayfarer
HS 11096	John Boswell	Love
HS 11098	Méav Ní Mhaolchatha	Méav
HS 11099	Rasa	Devotion
HS 11100	Various Artists	Starflight 1
HS 11101	Various Artists	Arabesque
HS 11102	Various Artists	Cruisers 1.0
HS 11103	Various Artists	The Absolute Sound
HS 11104	Various Artists	Celtic Twilight
HS 11105	Various Artists	MBNT: a Recollection of Proto-Ambient Music from the Hearts of Space
HS 11106	Various Artists	Celtic Twilight 2
HS 11107	Various Artists	Celtic Twilight 3: Lullabies
HS 11108	Various Artists	Celtic Twilight 4: Celtic Planet
HS 11109	Various Artists	Sacred Treasures: Choral Masterworks from Russia
HS 11110	Various Artists	Fiona Ritchie Presents the Best of Thistle & Shamrock, Volume 1
HS 11111	Various Artists	Prophecy: A Hearts of Space Native American Collection
HS 11112	Various Artists	Sacred Treasures II: Choral Masterworks from the Sistine Chapel
HS 11113	Various Artists	Celtic Twilight 5
HS 11114	Various Artists	Sacred Treasures III: Choral Masterworks from Russia and Beyond
HS 11115	Various Artists	Celtic Twilight 6
HS 11116	Various Artists	Sacred Treasures IV: Choral Masterworks - Quiet Prayers
HS 11117	Various Artists	Celtic Twilight 7: Sacred Spirit
HS 11118	Various Artists	Sacred Treasures V: From a Russian Cathedral
HS 11119	Various Artists	Celtic Woman 3
HS 11120	Various Artists	Prophecy 2
HS 11121	Various Artists	Celtic Twilight 6: Sanctuary
HS 11122	Various Artists	Celtic Twilight 7: Gaelic Blessing
HS 11200	Various Artists	Universe
HS 11201	Various Artists	Universe 2
HS 11202	Various Artists	Universe 3
HS 11203	Various Artists	Universe 4
HS 11204	Various Artists	New Romantics: A Hearts of Space Classic Collection
HS 11205	Various Artists	Universe 5
HS 11206	Various Artists	Slow Music for Fast Times
HS 11207	Various Artists	Slow Music for Yoga
HS 11300	Gino D’Auri	Flamenco Mystico
HS 11301	Kol Simcha	Voice of Joy
HS 11302	Gino D’Auri	Flamenco Passion & Soul
HS 11303	Kol Simcha	Klezmer Soul
HS 11304	Various Artists	World Voices Volume 1
HS 11305	Vox	Divine Rites
HS 11306	Transcendental	Steam (Hamam: The Turkish Bath) Original Motion Picture Soundtrack
HS 11307	Various Artists	Africa North
HS 11308	Agricantus	Best of Agricantus
HS 11309	Omar Faruk Tekbilek	One Truth
HS 11310	Shafqat Ali Khan	Shafqat Ali Khan
HS 11311	Third Planet	Third Planet
HS 11312	Lumin	Hadra
HS 11401	Bill Douglas	Eternity's Sunrise
HS 11402	Thomas Barquee	Temple
HS 11403	Tim Story	Shadowplay
HS 11404	Bruce Kaphan	Slider
HS 11405	Bill Douglas	A Place Called Morning
HS 11406	David Darling	Cello Blue
HS 11407	Rasa	Union
HS 11408	Bill Douglas	Homeland
HS 11409	Rasa	In Concert
HS 11410	John Boswell	Reflections of John Boswell
HS 11411	Constance Demby	Sanctum Sanctuorum
HS 11412	Constance Demby	Spirit Trance
HS 11413	Bill Douglas	Stepping Stones
HS 11415	Milargo Acustico	The Rubaiyyt of Omar Khayyam
HS 11416	Jeff Johnson and Brian Dunning	Katurran Odyssey
HS 11418	Michael Hoppe	Requiem
HS 11419	Coyote Oldman	Under an Ancient Sky
HS 11420	Raphael	Music for Love
HS 11421	Ralph Zurmühle	eQuinox
HS 11422	Fionnuala Sherry	Songs from Before
HS 11423	Secret Garden	Winter Poem
HS 11424	Lisbeth Scott	Om Sweet Om
HS 11425	Secret Garden	Just the Two of Us
HS 11426	Peter Kater & Tina Guo	Inner Passion
HS 11427	Lisbeth Scott	Eternal Om
HS 11428	Secret Garden	Live at Kilden: 20th Anniversary Concert
HS 11429	Secret Garden	Live at Kilden: 20th Anniversary Concert (DVD)
HS 11430	Constance Demby	Novus Magnificat: Through the Stargate (30 Year Anniversary Edition)
HS 11431	Kevin Braheny	Lullaby for the Hearts of Space (2017 remaster)
HS 11500	Various Artists	Best of Hearts of Space: No. 1—First Flight
HS 11501	Various Artists	Best of Hearts of Space: No. 2—Ancient Evenings
HS 11502	Various Artists	Best of Hearts of Space: No. 3—Innocence
RGB 501	D'Cückoo	Umoja
RGB 502	Candace Pacheco	The Vortex: Quantum Gate II
RGB 503	Candace Pacheco	If, Then...Else
RGB 504	Paul Haslinger	World without Rules
RGB 505	Mox	Mox
RGB 506	Paul Haslinger	Score
