= Valley Entertainment =

- Founded: 1994
- Founder: Barney Cohen, Jon Birge
- Distributor: Sony Music Entertainment / RED Distribution / Alternative Distribution Alliance
- Genre: Various
- Country of origin: U.S.
- Location: New York City
- Official website: valley-entertainment.com

Valley Entertainment is an American independent record label based in New York City, United States distributed by Sony Music Entertainment. The company was founded in 1994 by Barney Cohen and Jon Birge. In 2001, it acquired the prestigious back catalogue of space, ambient, and new-age music from Hearts of Space Records. As of 2017, it has a catalogue of about 375 releases.

== History ==
In 1979, Barney Cohen founded Valley Media (a separate company) and opened Valley Record Distributors in 1984. In 1994, he stepped down from Valley Media to focus on the proprietary independent music label he had started: Valley Entertainment, founded in 1994 by Barney Cohen and Jon Birge.

In 2001, they acquired from Stephen Hill the prestigious trademark and back catalogue of his Hearts of Space Records (including among its about 140 releases such albums as Constance Demby's 1986 Novus Magnificat, Michael Stearns's 1988 Encounter, Rich & Roach's 1990 Strata, Rich & Lustmord's 1995 Stalker, Steve Roach's 1996 The Magnificent Void, Robert Rich's 1998 Seven Veils, and solo albums by Paul Haslinger from Tangerine Dream). As Hill explained, "Despite our success, by 2000 things were getting very difficult for record companies our size, and ultimately we sold the label to a larger company in 2001. Luckily we found Jon Birge of Valley Entertainment, who recognized what we had accomplished and has kept the HOS Records catalog together and available." Though not any more associated with its business side, Stephen Hill continues to work on Artist & Repertoire and to produce new recordings for the label.

According to a statement from its director, the company has claimed being "blacklisted" in 2007 by the George W. Bush administration for releasing in the U.S. the Norwegian album Lullabies from the Axis of Evil.

In 2024 Valley Entertainment acquired Dancing Cat Records' Hawaiian Slack Key catalog.

== Labels ==
As of 2024, published or distributed labels include the following:

- Sledgehammer Blues (formerly AudioQuest Music)
- Hearts of Space Records (150+ releases)
  - RGB
- Valley Entertainment-Windham Hill Records (14 reissues)
- Valley Entertainment
- Dancing Cat Records
