= React (Robert Rich and Ian Boddy album) =

Live album by Robert Rich and Ian Boddy
- Released: March 25, 2008
- Recorded: Recorded live at the Iron Gate Theater in Philadelphia at Star's End 30th Anniversary Celebration Concert on June 17, 2007
- Genre: Ambient
- Length: 63:55
- Label: DiN
- Producer: Robert Rich and Ian Boddy

Robert Rich chronology
Eleven Questions (2007)	React (2008)

Ian Boddy chronology
Elemental (2006)	React (2008)	Slide (2008)

Professional ratings
Review scores
Source	Rating
Allmusic	4.5/5 stars

React (2008) is the third collaborative album by electronic musicians Robert Rich and Ian Boddy. Like their previous collaborations Outpost and Lithosphere, this album was released as a limited edition of 2000 copies.

== Track listing ==
1. ”Depth Charge” – 3:54
2. ”Ice Fields” – 7:10
3. ”Sojourn” – 3:32
4. ”AxD” – 7:53
5. ”Veiled” – 4:52
6. ”Slow Hand” – 7:52
7. ”Messages” – 2:16
8. ”Lithosphere” – 6:05
9. ”Blue Moon” – 6:23
10. ”React” – 7:04
11. ”Edge of Nowhere” – 6^33

Total time : 63:55

== Personnel ==
- Robert Rich – MOTM modular synthesizer, keyboards, flutes and lap steel guitar
- Ian Boddy – Apple MacBook Pro/Ableton Live? sampler & synthesisers
