= Propagation (album) =

Studio album by Robert Rich
- Released: 1994
- Recorded: 1993 at Soundscape Studio in Mountain View, California
- Genre: Ambient
- Length: 57:20
- Label: Hearts of Space Records
- Producer: Robert Rich

Robert Rich chronology
Soma (1992)	Propagation (1994)	Trances/Drones (1994)

Professional ratings
Review scores
Source	Rating
Allmusic	2.5/5 stars

Propagation (1994) is an album by the American ambient musician Robert Rich. This album is an expression of Rich’s interest in biology and is a tribute to the proliferation of organic life in all its forms. It features a complex range of world music influences, just tunings and guest performers, similar to Rainforest (1989).

== Track listing ==
1. ”Animus” – 9:29
2. ”Lifeblood” – 5:31
3. ”Whispers of Eden” – 7:35
4. ”Terraced Fields” – 4:24
5. ”Luminous Horizon” – 9:45
6. ”Spirit Catcher” – 9:25
7. ”Guilin” – 11:11

== Personnel ==
- Robert Rich – Wavestation, Morpheus, Proteus/3, DX711D, EPS16+, Prophet-5, bamboo and PVC flutes, ocarinas, lap steel guitar, fretless bass, su gzeng, zither, brass and clay dumbeks, tar, udu, talking drums, kendang, Waterphone, windwand and whirlies, key tree, Woodstock chimes, rainstick, shakers, “glurp”
- Andy Wiskes – environmental source recordings (“glurp food”)
- Lisa Moskow – sarod (track 3)
- Forrest Fang – violin (track 7)
- Carter Scholz – gendér and gambang (track 7)
