= Soma (Steve Roach and Robert Rich album) =

Studio album by Steve Roach and Robert Rich
- Released: 1992
- Recorded: at The Timeroom in Tucson, Arizona and Soundscape Studio in Mountain View, California
- Genres: Electronic, ambient
- Length: 57:11
- Label: Hearts of Space Records/Fathom
- Producers: Robert Rich and Steve Roach

Steve Roach chronology
Now / Traveler (1992)	Soma (1992)	The Lost Pieces (1993)

Robert Rich chronology
Geometry (1991)	Soma (1992)	Propagation (1994)

Professional ratings
Review scores
Source	Rating
Allmusic	4.5/5 stars
Muze	(positive)

Soma (sometimes spelled SoMa) was the second collaborative album by the U.S. ambient musicians Steve Roach and Robert Rich, following their 1990 album Strata.

== Overview ==
The liner notes explain that the word soma can be found in the ancient Vedic texts describing a drink made from plants to help commune with the gods (a botanical hallucinogen), and that the same word meant "body" in Ancient Greek.

The music on the album is electronic and ambient music with psychedelic overtones. The album ends with a gentle, serene piece for electric guitar titled "Touch".

The album reached number nine on the Billboard New Age chart for April 17, 1993.

== Track listing ==
1. "Love Magick" – 7:40
2. "Nightshade" – 9:07
3. "Going Inland" – 4:05
4. "Silk Ridge" – 6:05
5. "Blood Music" – 8:10
6. "Soma" – 12:07
7. "Seduction of the Minotaur" – 5:21
8. "Touch" – 4:36

All compositions by Steve Roach and Robert Rich.

== Personnel ==
Musical

- Steve Roach – synthesizers, samplers, drum programming, didgeridu, voice, clay water pots, rainstick, rocks, various percussions, Lakota Indian flute, ocarinas, "glurp"
- Robert Rich – synthesizers, samplers, bamboo and clay flutes, steel guitar, drum programming, Udu clay drums, dumbek, ceramic talking drum, Waterphone, kalimba, rainstick, various percussions, "glurp"

with

- Linda Kohanov – frame drum "cries, swirls and scratches" (on tracks 6 and 7)

Technical

- Production, recording, mixing: Steve Roach, Robert Rich
- Mastering: Stephen Hill, Robert Rich

Graphical

- Design, image editing, montage: Stephen Hill
- Cover: photochemical etching by Wernher Krutein (of Photovault, San Francisco)
- Artist photo: Chuck Koesters

== Sources ==
- Roach, Steve & Rich, Robert (1992). "CD liner notes" in Soma, San Francisco: Hearts of Space Records, 1992, SKU HS11033-2, EAN 0025041103329 (UPC 025041103329)
