= Hans Christian (musician) =

German cellist, bassist, musician (born 1960)

- Born: May 20, 1960 (age 66); Hannover, Germany
- Genres: World, fusion, chamber jazz, new-age, classical
- Occupations: Music producer, multi-instrumentalist
- Instruments: Bass guitar, cello, nyckelharpa, sarangi, balalaika, banjo, santoor, sitar, tambura
- Years active: 1987-present
- Labels: Allemande Music, New Earth Records, Hearts of Space Records, Lejos Del Paraiso

Hans Christian (also seen as Hans Christian Reumschüssel and other variations) is a German-born musician and producer now based in the U.S. in Sturgeon Bay, Wisconsin. Christian is a multi-instrumentalist (bass guitar, cello, nyckelharpa, and sarangi, but also balalaika, santoor, sitar, tambura, etc.) usually associated with world music, ethnic fusion, chamber jazz and sometimes new-age music, but who also plays electronic and classical music. His solo concerts feature the cello, sarangi, sitara, and nyckelharpa with a technique called live looping, where he uses a customized system to record and overdub his live playing on stage. His production work includes projects in a range of genres, from Americana to bluegrass, folk, rock, and devotional chants. He operates a recording studio in Sturgeon Bay, WI called STUDIO 330 and a record label named Allemande Music.

His first six years in the United States were spent in Los Angeles where he recorded, performed live or appeared on TV with Robbie Robertson, Gene Clarke, Sparks, John Waite, Billy Idol, Toni Childs, members of the Red Hot Chili Peppers, Victoria Williams and others. In the 1980s he appeared on American Bandstand, Solid Gold, and on MTV with various artists and worked as a musician with notable producers, including T Bone Burnett, Anton Fier, Daniel Lanois, Thomas Barquee, Ben Leinbach and Shimshai. He started his own first studio in a small cottage in San Francisco's Noe Valley neighborhood in 1989 where he recorded his own releases 'Hypnotized' (Allemande Music 1989), 'Phantoms' (Lejos Del Paraiso, 1992), as well as albums with German pop duo Mike'n Beethoven and Door County based artist Fred Doc Heide (Lessons I learned from the Moon, produced by Fred Alley). After moving his studio to Fairfax, CA in Marin County in 1998, Christian worked as producer and recording engineer for artists such as Krishna Das, Jai Uttal, Ancient Future, Habib Khan, Silvia Nakkach, Dave Stringer, Girish, and many others. He has toured extensively as a solo artist in North America and Western Europe, including multiple national tours with the GuruGanesha Band, RASA, and Spring Groove.

Since his move in 2002 to Door County, Wisconsin, Hans Christian has been active as a producer in the genres of Americana, Folk and Blues, working with Sikh chant artists GuruGanesha, Simrit, Snatam Kaur, and others, as well as with regional singer/songwriters, including Jon Doll, Rusty Wolfe, Yata, Randy Timm, Randy Bruce, Terry Murphy, John Rood Lewis, Jeanne Kuhns, Hunter Gatherer, Austin Skalecki, and many others. He also continues to collaborate with national chant artists, including Johanna Beekmann, Kavita Kat MacMillan, Dave Stringer, and others.

In 2021, Hans started to produce a series of songs to be used as fundraising tools for a variety of non-profit organizations, often working with Door County–based singer/songwriter Holly Olm. His 2023 release called Ocean Dreaming Ocean (Curve Blue Records), a collaboration with the late cellist David Darling garnered him a 2024 Grammy® nomination for Best Album in the New Age/Ambient/Chant genre. In 2024 he released an album called Melodiya, an instrumental collaboration with Thomas Barquee.

Since 2023 Hans Christian is also working as an independent Front Of House mix engineer at the Door Community Auditorium in Fishcreek, WI, where he has mixed FOH for the BoDeans, Don McLean, G-Love and others.

Awards:

- 2024 Grammy® nomination for Ocean Dreaming Ocean
- 2025 Bammy® Best Recording Studio/Studio Producer of the Year
- 2025 Bammy® Best Jazz/Classical composer of the year
- 2025 Bammy® Best String Instrumentalist of the year
- 2025 New Age Notes® Best New Age/Pop Crossover album for Melodiya
- 2025 New Age Notes® Best Classical Crossover album for Melodiya
- 2025 New Age Notes® Best Contemporary Crossover album of the year for Melodiya
- 2021 Best of the Midwest Media Fest® Award of Excellence for Thought Passing Through (with Pete Thelen and Bill Youmans)
- 2021 Best of the Midwest Media Fest® Best in Show for Thought Passing Through (with Pete Thelen and Bill Youmans)

Academic work:

As adjunct faculty/artist in residence with Ubiquity University he has performed as a solo cellist in and around Chartres Cathedral (Chartres, France) for six years (2008-2015) to set the musical framework for week long retreats. He has recorded three live CDs during these retreats (Sancta Camisia, Undefended Heart, All Is Well) and collaborated with faculty member and noted modern mystic Andrew Harvey on a collaboration called Rumi Symphony. He was also a part time faculty at NWTC Green Bay, WI teaching Audio Engineering classes between 2021-2023.

RASA:

Hans Christian is the co-founder of the Indian devotional group RASA, together with the Washington D.C.–based singer Kim Waters. Between 1999 and 2007 RASA released six CDs on the Hearts Of Space (now Valley Entertainment) and New Earth Records labels. The duo toured nationally and gave about 130 concerts.

Recording Studio 330:

Hans Christian's STUDIO 330 is located in Sturgeon Bay, Wisconsin and features a recently installed Audient 8024HE 36 channel console. STUDIO 330 offers recording and production services for independent artists and voice-over recording services for corporate clients.

== Discography ==
=== Solo albums ===
- 1994: Phantoms (Lejos del Paraiso/Allemande Music)
- 1996: Surrender (Allemande Music)
- 2004: Light & Spirit (New Earth Records)
- 2007: Cinema of Dreams (Allemande Music)
- 2008: Sancta Camisia: Cello Improvisations at Chartres Cathedral (Allemande Music)
- 2010: Undefended Heart: Live Cello Improvisations with loops (Allemande Music)
- 2011: All Is Well: Live Cello improvisations with loops (Allemande Music)
- 2011: Rumi Symphony (with Andrew Harvey)(Allemande Music)
- 2012: You Are The Music Of My Silence (with Harry Manx) (Allemande Music)
- 2014: Hidden Treasures (Allemande Music)
- 2015: Nanda Devi (New Earth Records). This album has been nominated for 'Album of the year 2015' by ZMR.
- 2016: Moments Of Grace (Sounds True)
- 2017: Source (Allemande Music)
- 2020: After The Fall (Allemande Music)
- 2022: Mariupol, Warrior Spirit, Resistance (with Jim Gelcer)
- 2022: DEEP DIVE 1 cello meditation (Allemande Music)
- 2023: DEEP DIVE 2 cello meditation (Allemande Music)
- 2023 Ocean Dreaming Ocean (with David Darling) (Curve Blue), Grammy®nominated
- 2024 Melodiya (with Thomas Barquee) (Allemande Music)

=== With Rasa ===
- 2000–2007: six albums (see discography)

=== Collaboration albums ===
Legendary music sessions include:

- 1987: Robbie Robertson (bass guitar for Robbie Robertson)
- 1987: So Rebellious a Lover (cello for Gene Clark & Carla Olson)
- 1987: Happy Come Home (Victoria Williams album) (cello for Victoria Williams)
- 1987: Union (cello for Toni Childs)

Guest performances include:

- 1997: Watchful (cello with Amoeba)
- 1998: Offerings (cello, sarangi, nyckelharpa with Vas)
- 1998: Pilgrim Heart (bass guitar, cello, vocals, sarangi, nyckelharpa with Krishna Das)
- 1998: Seven Veils (cello with Robert Rich)
- 2000: Live... on Earth (also Live on Earth) (bass guitar, cello with Krishna Das)
- 2000: Pivot (cello with Amoeba)
- 2003: Chakra Healing Chants (production with Sequoia Records)
- 2004: Reveal (production for Spirit Voyage Records)
- 2007: Divas and Devas (production for Spirit Voyage Records)
- 2007: The Journey Home (production for Spirit Voyage Records)
- 2008: Spring Fever (production for Springgroove)
- 2009: Adhara (production for Spirit Voyage Records)
- 2010: Ylang (cello for Robert Rich)
- 2010: Diamonds in the Sun (mixing and mastering for Girish)
- 2010: Silent Moonlight Meditation (production for Spirit Voyage Records)
- 2010: Crimson Sadhana (production for Spirit Voyage Records)
- 2010 to present: Hans Christian regularly contributes as a musician, producer, and mix engineer to a number of recordings in various genres.
