= Bestiary (disambiguation) =

A bestiary is a compendium of beasts.

Bestiary may also refer to:

- Bestiary (Robert Rich album), 2001
- Bestiary (Hail Mary Mallon album), 2014
- Bestiary!, a 1985 anthology of fantasy short stories
- Bestiary, a 2020 novel by K-Ming Chang
- The Bestiary, a 1998 supplement for the role-playing setting Dragonlance: Fifth Age
