= Seth Montfort =

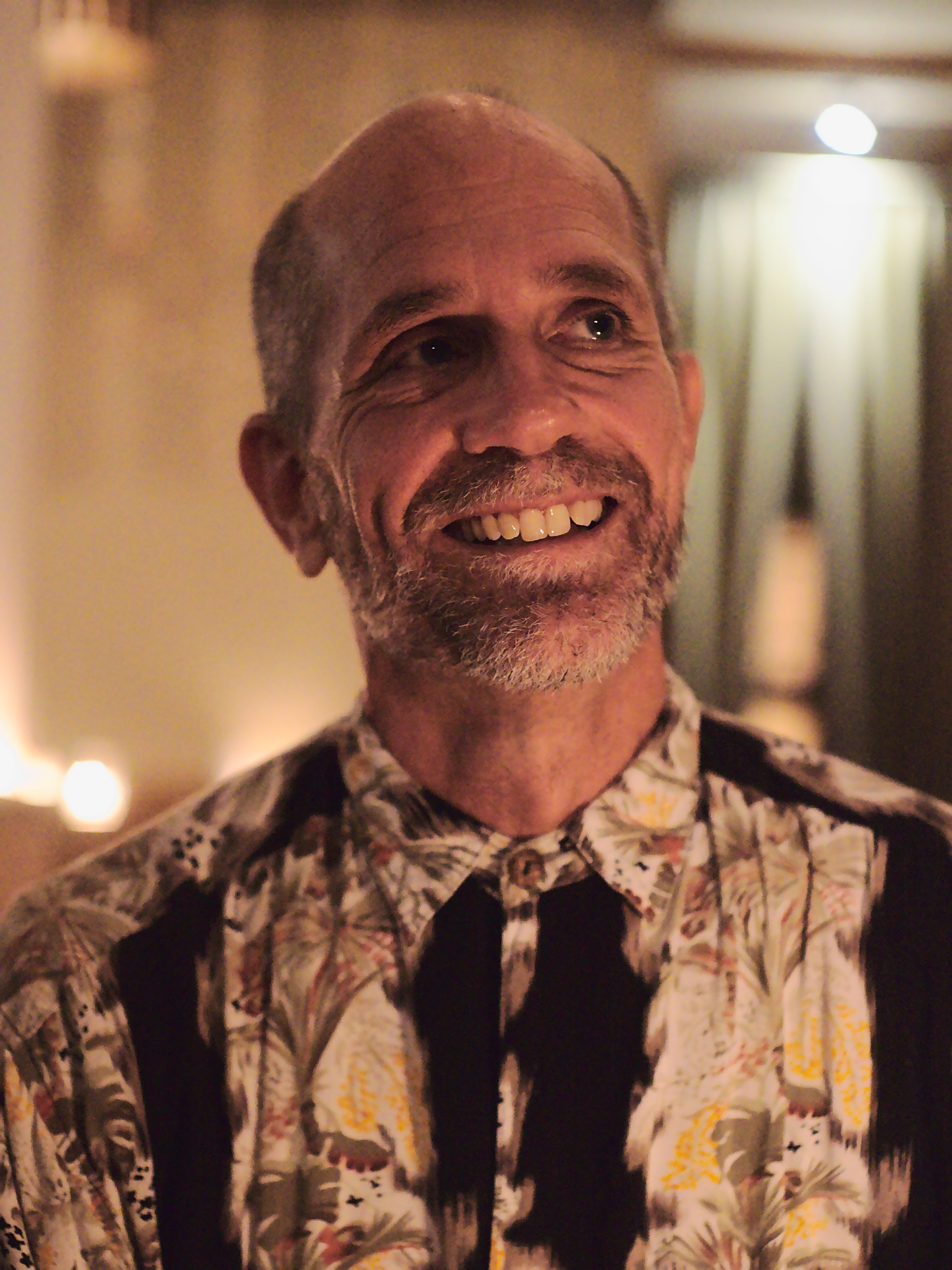
Seth Montfort at Proyecto Poporopo cultural center, Guatemala City

Seth Montfort is a pianist and founder of the "San Francisco Concerto Orchestra" which is a non-profit organization composed of classical musicians. He is also the brother of Matthew Montfort, musician and founder of Ancient Future.

== History ==
At an early age Montfort originally aspired to be an Olympic gymnast but gave up on the notion after an arm injury. Later, he won his first piano contest at the age of eleven by playing ragtime pieces by Scott Joplin. When Montfort was sixteen he debuted his career as a pianist when he played "Concerto for the Left Hand" with the Denver Symphony. Throughout his life Montfort has accumulated twelve different local, national, and international awards.

In 1989 Montfort founded the "San Francisco Concerto Orchestra". The non-profit organization's main objective is to allow classical musicians to alternate soloist opportunities so they can perform music that suits their interests. Since its conception over four hundred concerts have been performed involving more than five hundred musicians. At any give time the size of the orchestra ranges from fifteen through seventy-five musicians.

Monfort moved the operations to Guerneville, California in what was formerly a mortuary. The "San Francisco Concerto Orchestra" then became "The Mortuary Orchestra of Guerneville". This name change was suggested by John Moran, performing and literary arts manager for the Sonoma County Arts Council. In addition to the name change, the now "Mortuary Orchestra of Guerneville" also had a new venue to perform at. The original name for the venue was the "Russian River Performing Arts Center" but was later renamed to "Music Inside Out & Center" at some unspecified point. The move was also encouraged by Montfort's desire to have more time to practice his twenty-plus hours of memorized classical musical scores.

== Works ==
Montfort's also describes himself as a composer and has been working on a two-hour-long Aztec Piano Symphony. He also authored a self-published booked titled, "Aliens Made Me Play Gershwin". On July 29, 2009 Montfort publicly performed his original composition, "The Beekeeper Fandangos" for Lazy Bear Weekend 2009. The composition was written during and inspired by Lazy Bear Weekend 2008. No other works have been formally or informally published by Montfort.
