= Rasa (band) =

Musical duo who performs indian bhajan(religious poems) and western derivations

- Origin: San Francisco, California
- Genres: Folk, New Age
- Years active: 1998–present
- Labels: Hearts Of Space / Valley Entertainment, New Earth Records
- Members: Kim Waters; Hans Christian

Rasa are a musical duo that perform bhajan (Indian devotional music) and Western derivations.

Hans Christian is a German-born cellist and multi-instrumentalist. Kim Waters is an American vocalist and fan of A. C. Bhaktivedanta Swami Prabhupada.

Christian and Waters formed Rasa in 1998, in San Francisco, California. Hearts of Space Records published Rasa's first three albums: Devotion (2000), Union (2001), and Rasa in Concert (2002). Since then, the band has released three additional studio albums through New Earth Records. Their fifth album, Temple of Love (2006), is a tribute to the Khajuraho Group of Monuments.

== Discography ==
- Devotion (Hearts of Space Records 2000)
- Union (Hearts of Space Records 2001)
- Rasa in Concert (Hearts of Space Records 2002)
- Shelter (New Earth Records 2003)
- Temple of Love (New Earth Records 2006)
- Saffron Blue (New Earth Records 2007)
