= Ian Boddy =

British electronic musician and composer

- Born: 27 August 1959 (age 67)
- Origin: South Shields, Tyne and Wear, England
- Genres: Electronic, Ambient, Berlin School
- Occupations: Musician, composer, record label owner

Ian Boddy (born 27 August 1959) is a British electronic musician and composer. In the early 1980s Boddy began experimenting at an Arts Council-funded studio in Newcastle. This period resulted in three cassette releases on the Mirage label, which showcased Boddy's work with analogue synthesis and tape manipulation. "Images" (1980), "Elements of Chance" (1981) and "Jade". In 1983 Boddy's first LP, The Climb, was released, followed by two more LPs, Spirits (1984) and Phoenix (1986). In 1989 Boddy released his first CD, Odyssey, on the Surreal To Real label, followed by Drive (1991). Following these releases, Boddy founded the Something Else Records label, releasing another four albums, The Uncertainty Principle (1993), The Deep (1994), Continuum (1996), Rare Elements (1997) and reissuing his first three albums and one of his early cassettes, Jade (1992). On Something Else Records he also released three collaborations, Symbiont (1995) with Andy Pickford, Phase 3 (1997) with Ron Boots and Octane (1998) with Mark Shreeve under the name of ARC. A cassette-only release of live recordings between 1980 and 1989 was also available for a short period. In 1999 he founded the DiN Records label.

== Discography ==
- Box of Secrets DiN1 (1999)
- Distant Rituals DiN2 (1999) with Markus Reuter
- Autonomic DiN4 (1999) with Nigel Mullaney as Dub Atomica
- Caged DiN5 (2000) with Chris Carter
- Radio Sputnik DiN7 (2000) with Mark Shreeve as ARC
- Shrouded Space For Music Records (2000) Live recording for Philadelphia
- Triptych DiN9 (2001) with Markus Reuter and Nigel Mullaney
- Outpost DiN11 (2002) with Robert Rich
- Aurora DiN12 (2002)
- Blaze DiN15 (2003) with Mark Shreeve as ARC
- Chiasmata DiN16 (2004)
- Pure DiN17 (2004) with Markus Reuter
- Moire DiN18 (2005) with Bernhard Wostheinrich
- Arcturus DiN19 (2005) with Mark Shreeve as ARC
- Jodrell Bank Concert Space For Music Records (2002) with Markus Reuter. Live recording from 1999.
- Lithosphere DiN21 (2005) with Robert Rich
- Elemental DiN25 (2006)
- Fracture Din26 (2007) with Mark Shreeve as ARC
- React DiN29 (2008) with Robert Rich
- Slide DiN31 (2008)
- Dervish DiN33 (2009) with Markus Reuter
- Shifting Sands AD072 (2009) with David Wright
- Frontiers DIN39 (2012) with Erik Wøllo
- Axiom DiN64 (2020)
- Coil DiN74 (2022)
