= Watchful =

Studio album by Amoeba
- Released: 1997
- Recorded: 1994–1995
- Genre: Art rock
- Length: 48:35
- Label: Lektronic Soundscapes
- Producer: Robert Rich

Amoeba chronology
Eye Catching (1993)	Watchful (1997)	Pivot (2000)

Professional ratings
Review scores
Source	Rating
Allmusic	link
Alternative Press	5/5 link

Watchful (1997) is an album by the American experimental pop music group Amoeba. This is the first Amoeba album to feature the classic lineup of Robert Rich and Rick Davies. The style of this album consists of subtle and largely acoustic pop compositions with heavy ambient textures.

Work on this album began in 1994. It was completed in 1995. Over the next two years they searched for a label to distribute the album. It was finally released in 1997 on the Lektronic Soundscapes label. When distribution problems arose with Lektronic Soundscapes, they moved to Release Records, who had also released Rich’s solo album Trances/Drones.

== Track listing ==
1. "Inside" – 4:57
2. "Skin" – 2:53
3. "Origami" – 2:17
4. "Footless" – 5:02
5. "Ignoring Gravity" – 7:21
6. "Water Vapor" – 2:12
7. "Desolation" – 4:39
8. "Big Clouds" – 2:50
9. "Saragossa" – 4:06
10. "Any Other Sky" – 6:38
11. "Watchful Eyes" – 5:20

== Personnel ==
- Robert Rich - vocals, percussion, synthesizers, lap steel guitar, wind instruments
- Rick Davies - electric and acoustic guitars, bass

with:

- Hans Christian - cello (tracks 2, 4 and 9)
- Don Swanson - drums (tracks 4, 5 and 10)
- Ivy Barry - additional voice (track 4)
- Scott Wright - soprano and alto saxophone (track 10)
