= Bill Douglas (musician) =

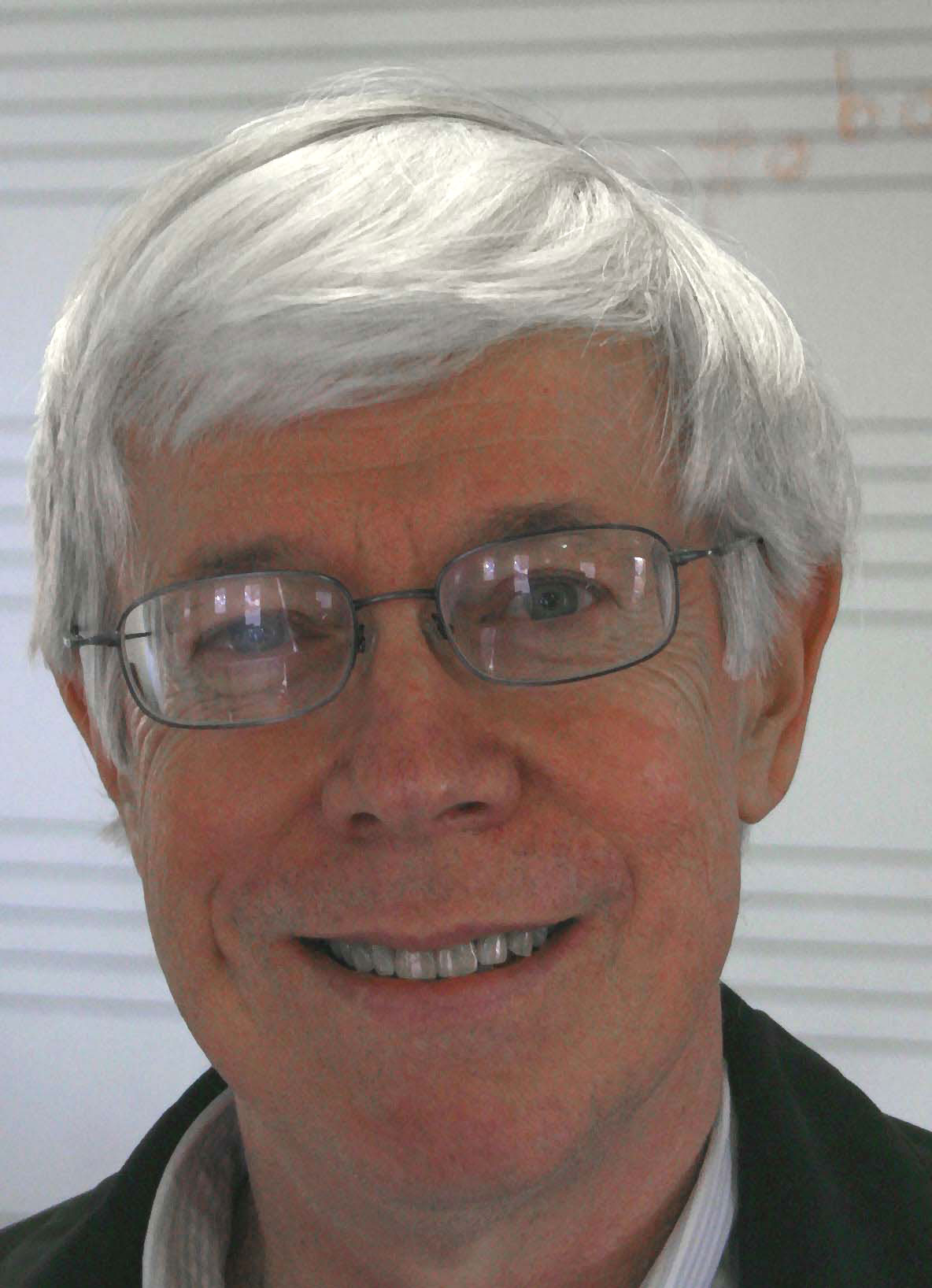
- Bill Douglas

Background information
- Born: Bill Douglas; November 7, 1944 (age 81); London, Ontario, Canada
- Genres: New-age
- Occupations: Musician, composer
- Instruments: Piano, keyboards, bassoon, trombone, flute, bass flute, clarinet, bass clarinet, contrabass clarinet, and others
- Years active: since 1989
- Labels: Hearts of Space, Tala

Bill Douglas (born November 7, 1944) is a Canadian musician, composer, pianist, and bassoonist whose works received influence from classical music, jazz, African, Brazilian and Indian music, 1970s funk and many other genres.

He has toured and recorded for thirty years with clarinetist Richard Stoltzman. As a bassoonist, he has played with the Toronto and New Haven Symphony Orchestras and has recorded three RCA albums with Peter Serkin and Tashi^{1} (Ida Kavafian, Fred Sherry, Richard Stoltzman and Peter Serkin). As a jazz pianist, he has toured and recorded with vibraphonist Gary Burton and bassist Eddie Gómez.

In 1994, the Society of Composers, Authors and Music Publishers of Canada (SOCAN), the Canadian equivalent of the American Society of Composers, Authors and Publishers (ASCAP) and Broadcast Music Incorporated (BMI), presented him with their classical composer of the year award. His compositions have been performed by major orchestras and chamber groups around the world. He has been teaching at Naropa University in Boulder, Colorado for twenty-nine years. Thirteen CDs of his music are available.

== Biography ==
Bill Douglas was born on November 7, 1944, in London, Ontario, Canada. His father played trombone and sang in a big band, and his mother played organ in church. His earliest memory is of himself playing in a one-man band with toy instruments when he was three. He began piano lessons at four and taught himself ukulele and guitar when he was seven. At age eight, he started to write songs influenced by early rock musicians such as Little Richard, The Everly Brothers, and Elvis Presley. His two brothers formed a band in which he performed these tunes and other rock songs from the 1950s.

When he was thirteen, he started to play bassoon and became very interested in both classical music and jazz. By this time, Douglas had definitely decided on a career in music. His heroes in jazz were Bill Evans, Miles Davis, and John Coltrane, and he wrote his first jazz tunes at fourteen. He received an "Associate of the Royal Conservatory of Toronto" diploma in classical piano at age seventeen.

From 1962 to 1966, Douglas attended the University of Toronto and obtained a BA in music education. During this time, he became very interested in 20th-century classical music, and started composing pieces influenced by Anton Webern, Elliott Carter, and Igor Stravinsky, as well as such contemporary jazz artists as Paul Bley and Gary Peacock. He played fourth bassoon in the Toronto Symphony, and often played jazz piano gigs on weekends.

Douglas was awarded a Woodrow Wilson Fellowship in 1966, and attended Yale University from 1966 to 1969. There he met clarinetist Richard Stoltzman, and they have been touring and recording ever since. In 1967, Douglas played three concerti with the Toronto Symphony. He received a Master of Music degree majoring in bassoon in 1968, and a Master of Musical Arts degree in composition in 1969. At this time, Douglas was writing very avant-garde atonal music. After Yale, he received a Canada Council award to study composition in London, England for a year.

From 1970 to 1977, Douglas taught at the California Institute of the Arts in Valencia, California. Here, he became very interested in African and Indian music. He started writing a series of rhythm studies for his students called Rock Etudes (later, the name was changed to Vocal Rhythm Etudes). These were influenced by African, Indian, and Brazilian music, as well as contemporary classical music, jazz, and funk (particularly the 70s funk of Miles Davis and Herbie Hancock). They have been used in many schools around North America, and he performs at least one of them in all his concerts. Douglas also started to write short tonal and modal lyrical pieces for his students. These eventually became part of his concert repertoire, and he has recorded many of them. He also recorded, in 1976, three RCA albums of classical chamber music with pianist Peter Serkin and Tashi.

In 1977, he moved to Boulder, Colorado to teach at the Naropa Institute. He continues to teach there and to tour with Richard Stoltzman and his own groups. With Richard, he also often plays with bassist Eddie Gomez. Some of his bassoon students from Cal Arts moved to Boulder with him, and they formed the Boulder Bassoon Band which played together for twenty years.

Bill Douglas has recorded eleven CDs of his music for Hearts of Space Records (owned since 2001 by Valley Entertainment). Six of these have featured the Ars Nova Singers conducted by Thomas Morgan. In 1998, RCA released an album entitled Open Sky: Richard Stoltzman plays the Music of Bill Douglas. In March, 1999, his Concerto for African Percussion Ensemble and Orchestra was premiered by Nexus and the Rochester Philharmonic Orchestra. In April, 2005, his oboe concerto was premiered by Peter Cooper and the Colorado Symphony Orchestra. In March, 2009, his Concerto for Darbouka and Orchestra was premiered by the Boulder Philharmonic Orchestra with soloist Rony Barrak.

Among the many musicians who have inspired and influenced him are Johann Sebastian Bach, Bill Evans, Keith Jarrett, Josquin des Prez, William Byrd, Dietrich Fischer-Dieskau, Ralph Vaughan Williams, and Ali Akbar Khan.

== Discography ==
Albums

- 1988: Jewel Lake (Hearts of Space Records)
- 1991: Cantilena (Hearts of Space Records)
- 1992: Everywhere - Live Studio Duets
- 1993: Kaleidoscope (Hearts of Space Records)
- 1995: Circle of Moons (Hearts of Space Records)
- 1996: Deep Peace (Hearts of Space Records)
- 1998: Songs of Earth & Sky (Hearts of Space Records)
- 1999: Earth Prayer (Hearts of Space Records)
- 2000: Eternity's Sunrise (Hearts of Space Records)
- 2001: A Place Called Morning (Hearts of Space Records)
- 2001: Feast (Northern Lights Productions) 17 songs
- 2002: Homeland: A Prayer for Peace (Hearts of Space Records)
- 2004: Stepping Stones (Hearts of Space Records)
- 2005: Sky (Hearts of Space Records)
- 2019: Quiet Moon (Hearts of Space Records) 14 songs

== Notes ==
^1Tashi consisted of violinist Ida Kavafian, cellist Fred Sherry, clarinetist Richard Stoltzman and pianist Peter Serkin.
