= Gaudi (disambiguation) =

Gaudí usually refers to Spanish architect Antoni Gaudí.

Gaudi may also refer to:

- Antonio Gaudi (film), a 1984 film about Antoni Gaudí
- Gaudi (The Alan Parsons Project album), 1987
  - Musical of the same name by Eric Woolfson, based on the above album
- Gaudí (Robert Rich album), 1991
- Gaudi (musician) (born 1963), Italian musician, composer and music producer
- 10185 Gaudi, a main-belt asteroid
- Google Audio Indexing (GAudi), a Google product that indexes the audio of YouTube videos
- Gaudi script, a Brahmic script and the ancestor of the Bengali-Assamese script, Odia script and Tirhuta script

== See also ==
- Gaudy
- Gauda (disambiguation)
