= Below Zero (Robert Rich album) =

Compilation album by Robert Rich
- Released: 1998
- Recorded: 1993 and 1996 at Soundscape Studio
- Genre: Dark ambient, experimental
- Length: 64:29
- Label: Side Effects
- Producer: Robert Rich

Robert Rich chronology
Numena + Geometry (1997)	Below Zero (1998)	Seven Veils (1998)

Professional ratings
Review scores
Source	Rating
Allmusic	link

Below Zero (1998) is an album by the American ambient musician Robert Rich. It is a compilation of work that was released on multi-artist collections, works created for such albums due later that year, and previously unreleased tracks.

It is the second compilation of this type released by Robert Rich, the first being A Troubled Resting Place (1996). It also follows a similar style to A Troubled Resting Place, consisting of turbulent organic atmospheres.

== Track listing ==
1. "Star Maker" – 21:24
  1. "Interstellar Travel"
  2. "Worlds Innumerable"
  3. "The Beginning and the End"
  4. "The Myth of Creation"
  (Originally released on Narratives: Works of Fiction, 1996)
2. "Dissolving the Seeds of a Moment" – 10:42
  (Previously unreleased.)
3. "A Flock of Metal Creatures Fleeing the Onslaught of Rust" – 7:02
  (Recorded for the Multimood 10th Anniversary Compilation, released later in 1998)
4. "Termite Epiphany" – 8:16
  (Recorded for Dry Lungs VI, released later in 1998)
5. "Liquid Air" – 9:00
  (Originally released on From Here to Tranquility II, 1994)
6. "Requiem" – 7:35
  (Originally released on Soundscapes Gallery, 1996)
