= Heresy (Lustmord album) =

Studio album by Lustmord
- Released: 1990
- Genre: Dark ambient
- Length: 62:55
- Label: Soleilmoon

Lustmord chronology
Paradise Disowned (1984)	Heresy (1990)	A Document of Early Acoustic & Tactical Experimentation (1991)

Professional ratings
Review scores
Source	Rating
Allmusic	3/5 stars

Heresy is an album released in 1990 by the dark ambient musician Lustmord. A remastered version was issued in 2004.

== Track listing ==
No.	Title	Length
1.	"Heresy Part I"	7:26
2.	"Heresy Part II"	10:16
3.	"Heresy Part III"	16:01
4.	"Heresy Part IV"	6:34
5.	"Heresy Part V"	7:54
6.	"Heresy Part VI"	14:44
Total length:		62:55

== Credits ==
- John Martin – front cover artwork
- Tracey Roberts – sleeve design
- Andrew Lagowski – engineer
- Chris Carter – producer
- Lustmord – programming, writing, sound design, mastering

== Sleeve notes ==
Liner notes: "Heresy is the culmination of work carried out from 1987 to 1989 and utilizes subterranean location recordings originated within crypts, caverns, mines, deep shelters and catacombs together with material of seismic and volcanic origin. It also takes advantage of psycho-acoustic phenomena and the physical effects of low frequency information."

== Critical reception ==
In 2010, Fact magazine described Heresy as "a classic, the crowning achievement of the "dark ambient" genre".
