= Coyote Oldman =

Native American flute player duo

- Origin: Oklahoma City, Oklahoma, United States
- Genres: New-age, electronica
- Years active: 1986–present
- Labels: Hearts of Space; Coyote Oldman Music
- Members: Barry Stramp; Michael Graham Allen
- Website: www.coyoteoldman.com

Coyote Oldman was a duo of new-age musicians consisting of Native American flute players Barry Stramp and Michael Graham Allen. The name Coyote Oldman is derived from the trickster archetype in Native American mythology.

Michael Graham Allen met Barry Stramp in 1981 at an Oklahoma City crafts fair. Their music can be described as new-age electronica. The duo plays Japanese and Indian flutes, Incan pan-pipes, ocarinas and Native American pipes, as well as contemporary instruments such as guitars and keyboards.

Oklahoma-born Barry Stramp (1959 - 2025) was a classically trained concert flautist, while Alabama-born Michael Graham Allen (b. 1950) is a manufacturer of handmade flutes in addition to being a musician. Since 1987, the duo has released 13 albums.

== Discography ==
- 1986 - Night Forest
- 1987 - Tear of the Moon
- 1988 - Landscape
- 1990 - Thunder Chord, Hearts of Space Records)
- 1992 - In Medicine River
- 1993 - Compassion
- 1995 - The Shape of Time
- 1997 - In Beauty I Walk—The Best of Coyote Oldman (Greatest Hits) (Hearts of Space Records)
- 1998 - Floating on Evening
- 1999 - House Made of Dawn (Hearts of Space Records)
- 2004 - Rainbird
- 2008 - Under an Ancient Sky (Hearts of Space Records)
- 2011 - Time Travelers
