= Lithosphere (album) =

Studio album by Robert Rich and Ian Boddy
- Released: 2005
- Recorded: April 2005 at Soundscape Studio in Mountain View, California
- Genre: Ambient
- Length: 52:46
- Label: DiN
- Producer: Robert Rich and Ian Boddy

Robert Rich chronology
Echo of Small Things (2005)	Lithosphere (2005)	Electric Ladder (2006)

Ian Boddy chronology
Arcturus (2005)	Lithosphere (2005)	Elemental (2006)

Professional ratings
Review scores
Source	Rating
Allmusic	link

Lithosphere (2005) is a collaborative album by electronic musicians Robert Rich and Ian Boddy. Like their previous collaboration Outpost, this album was released as a limited edition of 2000 copies.

== Track listing ==
1. ”Threshold” – 2:07
2. ”Vent” – 5:20
3. ”Chamber” – 6:29
4. ”Glass” – 3:40
5. ”Subduction” – 5:34
6. ”Geode” – 6:32
7. ”Stone” – 3:51
8. ”Metamorphic” – 7:25
9. ”Lithosphere” – 6:29
10. ”Melt” – 5:15

== Personnel ==
- Robert Rich – MOTM modular synthesizer, TimewARP2600, samples and scrapes, lap steel guitar
- Ian Boddy – NI Reaktor, Logic Pro Ultrabeat, EXS24, EVB3, VSL Glass, Stones, strings and woodwind samples, rocks
