= Fissures (album) =

Studio album by Robert Rich and Alio Die
- Released: 1997
- Recorded: November – December 1996 at Soundscape Studio in Cambria, California
- Genre: Dark ambient, electro-acoustic
- Length: 61:49
- Label: Fathom/Hearts of Space Records

Robert Rich chronology
A Troubled Resting Place (1996)	Fissures (1997)	Numena + Geometry (1997)

Alio Die chronology
Suspended Feathers (1996)	Fissures (1997)	The Hidden Spring (1997)

Professional ratings
Review scores
Source	Rating
Allmusic	link

Fissures (1997) is a collaborative album by ambient musicians Robert Rich and Alio Die (Stefano Musso).

== Track listing ==
1. ”Turning to Stone” – 5:27
2. ”A Canopy of Shivers” – 5:51
3. ”Sirena” – 9:10
4. ”Mycelia” – 8:13
5. ”The Divine Radiance of Invertebrates” – 8:37
6. ”The Road to Wirikuta” – 18:49
7. ”Tree of the Wind” – 5:40

== Personnel ==
- Robert Rich – synthesizers, flutes, percussion, dulcimer, lap steel guitar
- Stefano Musso – samples, textures and drones
