= Ariel Zuckermann =

Israeli flautist and conductor

- אריאל צוקרמן
- Born: 1973 (age 52–53); Tel Aviv, Israel
- Occupations: Conductor; Flutist
- Organizations: Israel Chamber Orchestra
- Website: arielzuckermann.com

Ariel Zuckermann (Hebrew: אריאל צוקרמן; born in 1973 in Tel Aviv) is an Israeli conductor and flautist who was the director and conductor of the Israel Chamber Orchestra from 2015 to 2023.

== Career ==
Ariel Zuckermann began his musical career as a flautist. A student of Paul Meisen and András Adorján, he also took master courses with Alain Marion and Aurèle Nicolet. Winner of a number of renowned international competitions, he played under conductors such as Lorin Maazel, Daniel Barenboim, Zubin Mehta and Riccardo Muti in orchestras such as the Symphony Orchestra of the Bavarian Radio, Munich Philharmonic, Israel Philharmonic Orchestra and Bavarian State Opera. Since 2002 he has been soloist of Kolsimcha - The World Quintet, an ensemble which has recorded extensively and performs worldwide.

Ariel Zuckermann studied orchestral conducting with Jorma Panula at the Royal College of Music, Stockholm. In May 2004 he graduated from Munich's Musikhochschule as conducting student of Bruno Weil and shortly afterwards was appointed Music Director of the Georgian Chamber Orchestra.

In 2003/2004, was appointed Assistant Conductor to Iván Fischer with the Budapest Festival Orchestra where he acquired a large repertoire and conducted many performances.

Further conducting engagements include concerts and recordings with the Israel Philharmonic Orchestra, Basel and Lucerne Symphony orchestras, Bavarian State Opera, KBS Radio Orchestra Seoul, Belgrade Philharmonic, Hungarian National Philharmonic, Munich Bach Collegium, Bremen Philharmonic as well as Rheinland-Pfalz State Philharmonic.

In November 2007, he made his debut with the Deutsches Symphonie-Orchester Berlin at Berlin's Philharmonie. Engagements in 2008/09 lead him to the WDR Symphony Orchestra in Cologne, Munich Radio Orchestra, Vienna Chamber Orchestra, Prague Philharmonic and see return visits to the Hungarian National and Bremen Philharmonics.
