= Eye Catching =

Studio album by Amoeba
- Released: 1993
- Genre: Art rock
- Length: 21:15
- Label: Soundscape Productions

Amoeba chronology
| Eye Catching (1993) | Watchful (1997) |

Professional ratings
Review scores
| Source | Rating |
|---|---|
| Allmusic | 3/5 stars |

Eye Catching (1993) is the debut album by the American experimental pop music group Amoeba. It is an EP length CD consisting of five songs.

This is the only Amoeba album not to feature the two-man lineup of Robert Rich and Rick Davies. The lineup on this album is a quartet featuring Rich, bassist Andrew McGowan, guitarist David Hahn and drummer Matt Isaacson. Rich and McGowan had previously worked together in a group called Urdu (1983-1984).

== Track listing ==
1. Ooze - 3:24
2. Lizard Brain - 4:59
3. Knee Jerk Reaction - 4:10
4. Snail Song - 4:42
5. Untitled (storm drain) - 4:00
