= Ralph Zurmühle =

Background information
- Born: Zürich, Switzerland
- Genres: contemporary, classical
- Instrument: piano
- Website: www.ralphpiano.com

Ralph Zurmühle (or Zurmuhle) is a Swiss composer and pianist. Zurmühle was born in Zürich and grew up mainly in Liechtenstein. He graduated from the University of Zürich and now lives in Spain. Zurmühle discovered his natural talent for the piano at the age of five and developed it over decades with jazz and classical music studies.

His CD recordings, composed in the genre of contemporary post-classical piano music, have been met with international critical acclaim and have received multiple awards and nominations. His fourth CD eQuinox, published in 2011, was originally produced and distributed by Valley Entertainment, New York. In 2023 a vinyl of Zurmühle's Studio Live Session at Little Big Beat Studios was released. This album had been recorded during COVID-19 pandemic in the summer of 2020.

Compositions from these CDs have been featured in films and multi-media projects worldwide. For more than twenty years Ralph Zurmühle has been scoring music for film and performing solo piano concerts, mostly playing his own repertoire.

Pianists he has performed with include Peter Kater, Chad Lawson and David Peña Dorantes.

== Discography ==
- 2000 Between
- 2003 Communion
- 2007 Our Mother
- 2011 eQuinox
- 2014 Reflections
- 2019 As Time Passes
- 2023 Live Studio Session (vinyl)
- 2024 Reverence

== Multimedia and film productions ==
- 1992 From the Other End of Time, performance by Arno Oehri, New York
- 1994 Nachtgebet, film-performance by Arno Oehri, Sarjetschnij, Russia
- 1996 Der Berg, das Meer und die Wunde, theater piece by Arno Oehri, Liechtenstein
- 1999 The Norman Lee Story, documentary by Arno Oehri, Liechtenstein, USA
- 2005 Norró, documentary by Pere Herms for National Spanish TV La 2 (Spain)
- 2005 New music for classic silent films – original score and live performance for classic silent films by Luis Buñuel, Marcel Duchamp, Man Ray, René Clair and Walter Ruttmann, 2005, Institut Valencià d'Art Modern, Spain.
- 2006 L'horitzó, Multimedia project by Manuel Solà, Metrònom, Barcelona, and International Biennial of Contemporary Art, Almería, Spain
- 2006 Harvest Moon film by Jack McKusky, Barcelona, Spain
- 2008 All Secrets, film by Thomas Suski, Edinburgh, U.K.
- 2009 Erinnere dich, was sie dir angetan haben..., documentary, Germany
- 2013 Momix Alchemia, multimedia performance with Horizon from the CD Our Mother, New York
- 2014 Lars o hechizando vientos, Multimedia project by Manuel Solà, Museo Can Mario, Palafrugell (Girona), Spain
- 2014 La Primera Sonrisa - The First Smile, documentary by Guadalupe Sánchez Sosa, Mexico
- 2014 The Appalachian Trail: An American Legacy, documentary by Sam Henegar, USA
- 2015 Piano, documentary by Vita Drygas, Poland
- 2019 Der Eidechsenkönig, film by Arno Oehri, Liechtenstein

== Reviews ==
"Reflections explores the sonority of the piano masterfully and reaches a technical and artistic dimension only achievable by the finest contemporary piano works." Yamaha Spain

"25 years after the glory days of the solo piano genre sparked by artists like Keith Jarrett and George Winston, the solo piano album remains an elusive undertaking: very easy to do - very hard to do well. Swiss pianist Ralph Zurmühle is one of those rare artists, who does it sublimely well, with great sensitivity to touch, melody, and ambience. Listen and you will find yourself in the hands of a master."(Stephen Hill, San Francisco, Producer of Hearts of Space Radio)

"As Time Passes is music to spur the imagination. With inspiration, simplicity and elegance, this superb work by Ralph Zurmühle confirms the solid trajectory of one of the greatest exponents in the world of solo piano." Yamaha Spain
