= Inner Landscapes =

Live album by Robert Rich
- Released: 1987
- Recorded: March 9, 1985 in Berkeley, California
- Genre: Ambient, new-age, space music
- Length: 84:09 (cassette); 73:55 (CD)
- Label: Auricle
- Producer: Robert Rich

Robert Rich chronology
Live (1984)	Inner Landscapes (1987)	Numena (1987)

Alternative cover
- CD release, 1998

Professional ratings
Review scores
Source	Rating
Allmusic	link

Inner Landscapes (1987) is a live album by the American ambient musician Robert Rich. It was recorded on March 9, 1985 in Berkeley, California. This album was originally released on cassette in 1987 and was re-edited and released on CD in 1998.

== Track listings ==
=== Cassette, 1987 ===
1. ”Approach” – 9:24
2. ”Ascent” – 12:07
3. ”Descent Into the First Chamber” – 21:00
4. ”First Chamber” – 11:07
5. ”Second Chamber” – 11:34
6. ”Third Chamber” – 10:21
7. ”Inner Sanctum” – 8:36

=== Cd, 1998 ===
1. ”Part 1” – 13:22
2. ”Part 2” – 11:20
3. ”Part 3” – 8:14
4. ”Part 4” – 13:25
5. ”Part 5” – 7:09
6. ”Part 6” – 2:21
7. ”Part 7” – 9:21
8. ”Part 8” – 8:43

== See also ==
- Robert Rich
- Ambient music
