= Numena + Geometry =

Compilation album by Robert Rich
- Released: 1997
- Recorded: 1985–86 in Palo Alto, California and 1986–87 in Menlo Park, California
- Genre: Ambient
- Length: 121:14
- Label: Fathom/Hearts of Space Records
- Producer: Robert Rich

Robert Rich chronology
Fissures (1997)	Numena + Geometry (1997)	Below Zero (1998)

Professional ratings
Review scores
Source	Rating
Allmusic	link

Numena + Geometry (1997) is an album by the American ambient musician Robert Rich. It is a two-disc set containing Rich's albums Numena (1987) and Geometry (1991).

== Track listing ==
=== Disc one: Numena ===
1. ”The Other Side of Twilight” – 25:04
2. ”Moss Dance” – 5:45
3. ”Numen” – 11:51
4. ”The Walled Garden” – 10:32

=== Disc two: Geometry ===
1. ”Primes, Part 1” – 5:20
2. ”Primes, Part 2” – 6:34
3. ”Interlocking Circles” – 8:35
4. ”Geometry of the Skies” – 13:48
5. ”Nesting Ground” – 6:13
6. ”Geomancy” – 10:35
7. ”Amrita (Water of Life)” – 6:39
8. ”Logos” – 9:57
