= Israel Chamber Orchestra =

Israeli orchestra based in Tel Aviv

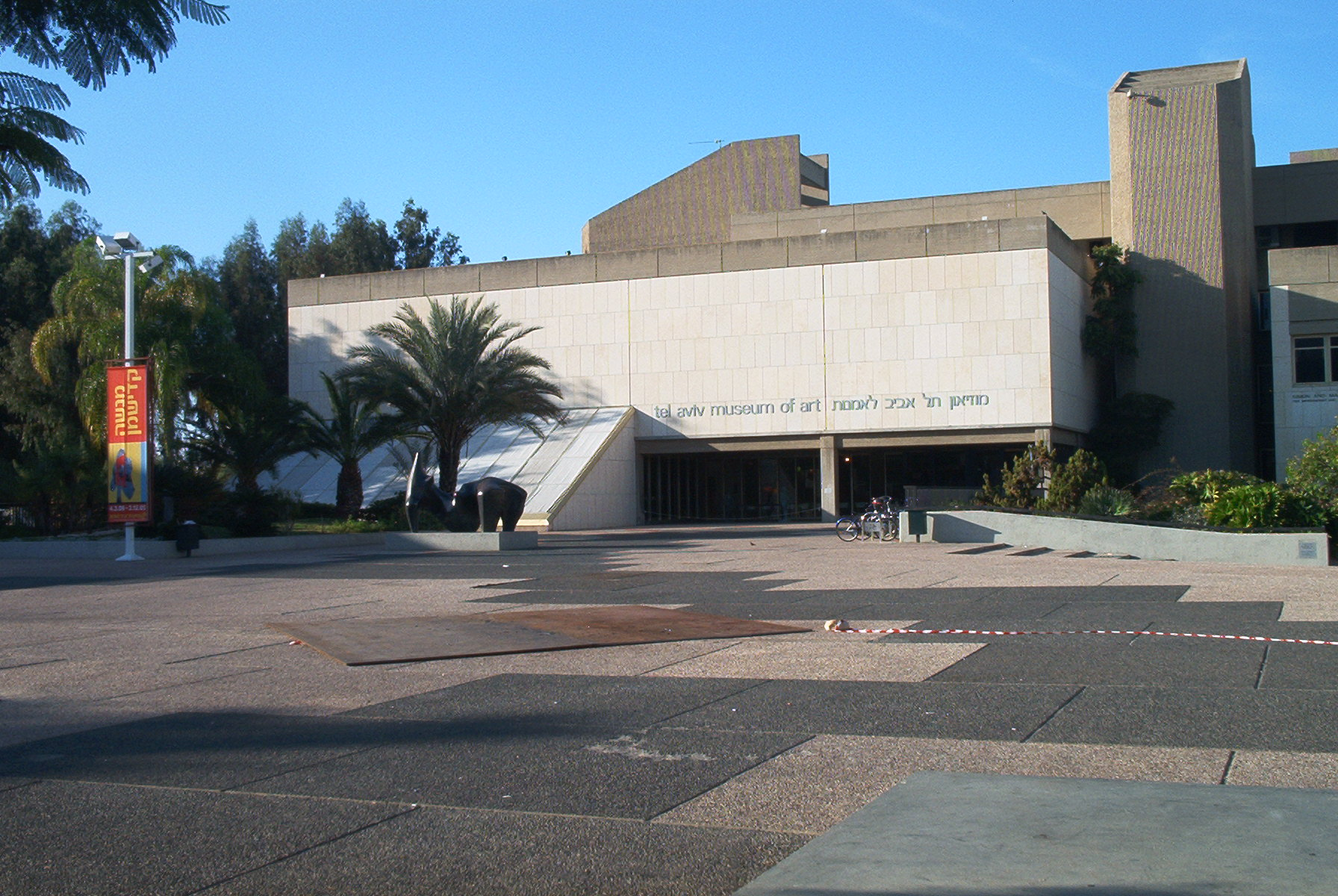
Home of Israel Chamber Orchestra, Recanati Hall, Tel Aviv Museum

Israel Chamber Orchestra (abbreviation ICO, Hebrew: התזמורת הקאמרית הישראלית) (Hatizmoret hakamerit) is an Israeli orchestra based in Tel Aviv. Primary funding comes from the Israel Ministry of Education and the Tel Aviv-Yafo Municipality.

== History ==
Gary Bertini founded the orchestra in 1965 and was its first artistic director, for 10 years. The ICO's first US appearance was in New York in 1969. Luciano Berio was the ICO's artistic director in 1975. Rudolf Barshai led the ICO from 1976 to 1981. Other leaders of the orchestra have included Uri Segal, Yoav Talmi (1984-1988), and Shlomo Mintz (1989-1993). Philippe Entremont was artistic director from 1995 to 1998, and is now the ICO's conductor laureate.

Salvador Mas Conde was the ICO's music director from 1998 to 2002 and Noam Sheriff from 2002 to 2005. Gil Shohat succeeded Sheriff as artistic director and chief conductor from 2005 to 2008. In 2009, Roberto Paternostro was appointed as the ICO's musical adviser, and Elizabeth Wallfisch was named the orchestra's baroque program adviser. In February 2013, Yoav Talmi returned to the ICO as its music director, but resigned in 2014. In 2015, Ariel Zuckermann became the ICO's music director, and held the post until his dismissal by ICO management in 2023. In April 2024, the ICO announced the appointment of Ruben Gazarian as its next chief conductor and artistic leader.

The ICO has recorded with such labels as Chandos, Naxos (music of Alberto Ginastera), Musicmasters, Koch and Teldec (music of Schoenberg and Tchaikovsky).

== See also ==
- Music of Israel
- Culture of Israel
