= Sacred Treasures: Choral Masterworks from Russia =

Compilation album by Various artists
- Released: 17 February 1998
- Genre: Choral, Classical, Christian
- Length: 62:55
- Language: English
- Label: Hearts of Space Records
- Producer: Ellen Holmes

Professional ratings
Review scores
Source	Rating
Allmusic	3/5 stars

Sacred Treasures: Choral Masterworks from Russia is the first release in the Hearts of Space Records series 'Sacred Treasures'. The 1998 compilation album is composed of choral pieces from the Russian Orthodox Church.

== Track listing ==
No.	Title	Performer(s)	Length
1.	"Russian Cathedral Bells"		0:22
2.	"Great Ektenia: Liturgy of St. John Chrysostom by Sergei Rachmaninoff"	State Symphony Capella of Russia	3:48
3.	"Hymn of Praise: Liturgy of St. John Chrysostom by Sergei Rachmaninoff"	State Symphony Capella of Russia	3:04
4.	"Hymn of the Cherubim (Excerpt): Liturgy of St. John Chrysostom by Sergei Rachmaninoff"	State Symphony Capella of Russia	4:43
5.	"Hymn of the Cherubim (Excerpt) by Dmitry Bortniansky"	The Leningrad Glinka State Academic Choir	4:02
6.	"Our Father by Nikolay Kedrov Sr."	"Svetoslav Obretenov" Bulgarian National Choir	3:57
7.	"Fervent Supplication (Excerpt ): Liturgy of St. John Chrysostom by Sergei Rachmaninoff"	State Symphony Capella of Russia	3:50
8.	"The Noble Joseph: The Bulgarsky Rospev, arranged by Pyotr Turchaninov"	Men’s Chamber Choir of Sofia	2:39
9.	"Amen, And with Thy Spirit: Liturgy of St. John Chrysostom by Pyotr Ilyich Tchaikovsky"	The USSR State Chamber Choir	1:20
10.	"Russian Monastic Vespers (Excerpt)"	Choir of Monks from the Monastery of Chevetogne	1:29
11.	"Bless the Lord, O my Soul: Liturgy of St. John Chrysostom by Sergei Rachmaninoff"	Choir of the Moscow Church	5:13
12.	"Hymn of the Cherubim (Excerpt): Liturgy of St. John Chrysostom by Pyotr Ilyich Tchaikovsky"	The USSR State Chamber Choir	7:41
13.	"Hymn of the Cherubim (Excerpt/Edited) by Dobri Hristov"	"Svetoslav Obretenov" Bulgarian National Choir	6:41
14.	"Our Father: Liturgy of St. John Chrysostom by Pyotr Ilyich Tchaikovsky"	The USSR State Chamber Choir	3:34
15.	"I Have Chosen the Blissful by Alexander Gretchaninov"	Bulgarian Radio and Television Mixed Choir	4:52
16.	"Hymn of the Cherubim by Grigory Lvovski"	Bulgarian Radio and Television Mixed Choir	5:00
17.	"Final Bells"		0:40
