= Paul Sauvanet =

Paul Sauvanet (born 1950), is a French musician, pianist, composer, conductor and music professor.

== Discography ==
  - La détente par la musique (1988) Les Voiles d'Or
  - Sérénité (1989) Les Voiles d'Or
  - La cérémonie de l'oiseau (1989) Les Voiles d'Or
  - La respiration consciente (1990) Les Voiles d'Or
  - Migrations (1990) Les Voiles d'Or
  - Le songe du temps (1991) Les Voiles d'Or
  - Eleusis (1992) Les Voiles d'Or (1994) Polygram
  - Time Dreaming (1994) Polygram
  - Tristesse (1995) Hearts of Space Records
  - Nomad (1997) Hearts of Space

== Bibliography ==
- Sauvanet at Allmusic.com
