= Raphael (musician) =

American musician

- Also known as: Raphael Decosterd (or Décosterd)
- Born: Raphael F. Sharpe; 1948 (age 77–78); Tulsa, Oklahoma
- Origin: California
- Genres: Ambient music, new age
- Labels: Hearts of Space, Kahua

Raphael (born 1948) is an American musician and composer of ambient music.

== Biography ==
Raphael F. Sharpe was born in Tulsa, Oklahoma in 1948. Raised by Benedictine nuns, when his family got ill, he learned classical music and Gregorian chant.

In 1967, he participated at the San Francisco Summer of Love, masquerading as a velvet-caped European count playing gypsy style violin. He studied piano at the San Francisco Conservatory. From there he moved to the Esalen Institute at Big Sur where he worked for ten years as a teacher and musician. There he started pursuing music as a therapy, mixing world rhythms and western music.

In 1988 he released 'Music To Disappear In' which sold over 500,000 copies.

In 1990, Raphael moved to Maui, Hawaii, and married Swiss-born psychotherapist Kutira Decosterd. They founded the Kahua Hawaiian Institute, where they perform musically and teach Oceanic Tantra.

In 1992, he founded Kahua Records, the label of his latest works.

Raphael's work are all published under his sole first name. Some websites refer to him as Raphael Decosterd (or Décosterd) but it seems to be his Swiss-born wife's last name. The Kahua Institute's website refers to him as Raphael F. Sharpe.

== Discography ==
=== As a solo artist ===
- Music to Disappear In (1988) – Hearts of Space Records
- Music to Disappear In II (1991) – Hearts of Space Records
- Angels of the Deep (1994) – Hearts of Space Records
- Intimacy (Music for Love) (1996) – Hearts of Space Records

=== With Kutira ===
- Never Give Up! – Kahua Records
- Sacred Feminine Voices of Bhutan – Kahua Records
- The Calling – Kahua Records
- Like an Endless River – Kahua Records
- Prayer – Kahua Records
- Oceanic Trantra – Kahua Records
- The Opening – Kahua Records

=== With Wendy Grace ===
- Immaculate Heart – Kahua Records

=== With The Shaman Dancers ===
- The Lovers Within – Kahua Records

=== With Alan Cohen ===
- Journey to the Center of the Heart – Kahua Records
