= Echo Passage =

Studio album by Alio Die and Vidna Obmana
- Released: 1999
- Genre: Ambient
- Length: 68:32
- Label: Projekt Records; PRO190

Reissue cover
- Cover of the 2006 Projekt Records reissue

Professional ratings
Review scores
Source	Rating
Allmusic	3/5 stars

Echo Passage is a collaborative album by ambient musicians Alio Die (Stefano Musso) and Vidna Obmana (Dirk Serries). The album was originally released in 1999 on the Italian label Musica Maxima Magnetica and was reissued on Projekt Records in 2006.

== Track listing ==
1. "Echo Passage (Echoes of Light—A Slip of Darkness—The Passage)" - 68:32

== Personnel ==
1. Vidna Obmana - Electronics, loops, recycling and various acoustics.
2. Alio Die - Samples, treatments, textures and drones.

== See also ==
- Echo Passage at Musica Maxima Magnetica
- Vidna Obmana
- Ambient music
- Electronic music
