= Andy Pickford =

British electronic music composer

Andy Pickford (born 22 October 1965) is a British electronic music composer and performer. Active since the early 1980s, he is known for his work in the Berlin School, ambient, and progressive electronic genres. Pickford has released numerous solo albums and collaborated with artists such as Paul Nagle and Ian Boddy.

== Career ==
Pickford began his music career in the 1980s with cassette releases such as Second Approach (1981). He gained wider attention with his 1992 album Replicant, which drew thematic influence from the film Blade Runner and was produced using a Korg T3-EX.

In 1994, his Darklands EP was reviewed in Music Week, which described it as a "worthy experiment" and compared its sound to Tangerine Dream and Jean-Michel Jarre.

He released Maelstrom the same year on Centaur Discs, featuring cover art by Tobias Richter, now known for his CGI work. Pickford has performed at events such as the Electronic Music and Musicians Association (EMMA) festival, where he debuted material from Terraformer, and at Eppyfest in 2014.

In addition to solo work, Pickford collaborated with synthesist Paul Nagle in the duo Binar, known for Berlin School-inspired improvisations. His later works include the albums Terraformer (2019) and Forbidden Spheres (2023).

Throughout the 1990s, Andy Pickford maintained an active live performance schedule across the Midlands, regularly appearing at venues such as the Burton Brewhouse, Derby Guildhall, Derby Cathedral, Derby Assembly Rooms, and The Flowerpot in Derby. His concerts often coincided with the release of new albums, and his work received coverage in regional publications.

== Selected discography ==
- Replicant (1992)
- Terraformer (1994)
- Maelstrom (1995)
- Forbidden Spheres (2023)
- Outland (2026)
