= Eleven Questions =

Studio album by Robert Rich and Markus Reuter
- Released: 2007
- Recorded: 2007 at Soundscape Studio in Mountain View, California
- Genre: Ambient
- Length: 53:12
- Label: Unsung Records
- Producer: Robert Rich and Markus Reuter

Robert Rich chronology
Illumination (2007)	Eleven Questions (2007)	React (2008)

Eleven Questions (2007) is an international collaboration of Robert Rich and Markus Reuter which was conceived, composed and recorded in person in one intense week at Rich’s Soundscape studio in California. Rich then completed, mixed and mastered the work over the subsequent two months.

== Track listing ==
1. ”Reminder” – 3:27
2. ”Reductive” – 4:27
3. ”Recall” – 2:24
4. ”Retention” – 6:34
5. ”Remote” – 4:16
6. ”Reluctant” – 3:27
7. ”Redemption” – 6:41
8. ”Relative” – 3:27
9. ”Reception” – 3:04
10. ”Refuge” – 5:53
11. ”Refuse” – 3:43
12. ”Rebirth” – 3:26
13. ”Remainder” – 2:12

== Personnel ==
- Markus Reuter – touch guitar, acoustic guitar, piano
- Robert Rich – sound design, piano, flutes, lap steel guitar
- SiRenée – voices
- Recorded at Soundscape Studio, Mountain View, California
- Mixed and mastered by Robert Rich
- Composed by Markus Reuter and Robert Rich
- Photography by Brad Cole
- Design by John Bergin
- Special thanks to Metasonix, Haroun Serang, Bernhard Wöstheinrich, Dixie, Synthesis Technology and many others
