= Pigs of the Roman Empire =

Studio album by Melvins / Lustmord
- Released: August 23, 2004
- Recorded: 2004
- Genres: Sludge metal, dark ambient
- Length: 60:00
- Label: Ipecac
- Producer: B. Lustmord

Lustmord chronology
| Carbon/Core (2004) | Pigs of the Roman Empire (2004) | Lustmord Rising (2006) |

Melvins chronology
| Neither Here Nor There (2004) | Pigs of the Roman Empire (2004) | Never Breathe What You Can't See (2004) |

Professional ratings
Review scores
| Source | Rating |
|---|---|
| Allmusic | 3/5 stars |

Pigs of the Roman Empire is an album by the American rock band Melvins and electronic musician Lustmord, which was released in 2004 through Ipecac Recordings. Adam Jones, guitarist for Tool, also makes substantial contributions to the album.

Speaking to Kerrang! in 2008, Melvins singer/guitarist King Buzzo remembered:

I'd always liked what Lustmord did and I thought that doing a record with him would be a really good thing to do. A far as it being a collaboration, there are things on that record that are strictly 'us' and strictly 'him' but we never said which was which because we didn't want people to have any preconceived ideas. For example, [with the title track] we gave him 11 minutes of music and he came back with 22, which was exactly what we wanted him to do. But some parts are just me and Dale nearing the end of our tether with Kevin [Rutmanis, Melvins bassist who left the band soon after] and there are things that critics blamed Lustmord for when he's not even on the track! If I had to say 'buy these 5 records', then this would be one of them.

== Track listing ==
All songs written by King Buzzo and Lustmord

| No. | Title | Length |
|---|---|---|
| 1. | "III" | 3:00 |
| 2. | "The Bloated Pope" | 3:45 |
| 3. | "Toadi Acceleratio" | 3:25 |
| 4. | "Pigs of the Roman Empire" | 22:29 |
| 5. | "Pink Bat" | 6:32 |
| 6. | "ZZZZ Best" | 1:59 |
| 7. | "Safety Third" | 6:11 |
| 8. | "Idolatrous Apostate" | 6:46 |
| 9. | Untitled | 5:47 |

The CD edition lists only the first eight tracks. The hidden ninth track includes two songs separated by a bit of silence. A double LP edition was released by Alternative Tentacles, listing the ninth track as "??" and also includes the original mix of "Safety Third" as an unlisted bonus.

== Personnel ==
- King Buzzo - vocals, guitar, bass guitar, electronics
- Dale Crover - drums
- Kevin Rutmanis - bass guitar, slide bass, electronics, guitar, keyboards
- Adam Jones - guitar
- B. Lustmord - sound design, programming, production

with

- Sir David Scott Stone - additional electronics & keyboards

=== Additional personnel ===
- Toshi Kasai - engineer
- John Golden - mastering
- Mackie Osborne - art direction & design
