= Somnium (album) =

Studio album by Robert Rich
- Released: 2001
- Recorded: 1994–2000
- Genre: Ambient, electro-acoustic, electronic
- Length: 419:57 (6:59:57)
- Label: Hypnos/Soleilmoon Recordings (in association with Release/Relapse Records)
- Producer: Robert Rich

Robert Rich chronology
Humidity (2000)	Somnium (2001)	Bestiary (2001)

Professional ratings
Review scores
Source	Rating
Allmusic	link

Somnium (2001) is an album by the American ambient musician Robert Rich. It is a seven-hour album on a DVD-video that was partly inspired by Rich's sleep concert series of the early 1980s and mid 1990s. Like those concerts, the music on this album was composed to influence the dreams and pre-REM hypnagogic visions of the listener. For this purpose it is suggested that the volume be kept down to the threshold of perceptibility, ideally with speakers surrounding the listener's bed. Rich also recommends this album for conventional listening.

For a brief period at the beginning of the album there is a slightly more active texture while the listener adjusts the volume and settles down to sleep. As the music progresses it slowly drifts through a variety of electronic drones as well as acoustic source material and nature recordings. The third and final track gradually fades into a morning atmosphere filled with bird songs.

In order to allow for the album's seven-hour length it was released on the DVD-video format instead of DVD-Audio. Rich also wanted to avoid the digital artifacts caused by compression. To achieve this the frames of video that a DVD player uses to navigate inside a chapter were not included. In spite of this, the second track had to be compressed using Dolby AC-3 encoding in order to maintain the album's length.

It has been estimated that this is the longest single piece of music ever committed to a commercially recorded format, until that record was broken by the release of the 24-hour-long "7 Skies H3" by psychedelic rock group The Flaming Lips. However, "7 Skies H3" was not released commercially. Instead, Robert Rich himself released a follow-up on Blu-ray in 2014, Perpetual, including an 8-hour piece of the same name plus a re-issue of Somnium in full length.

== Track listing ==
1. "Part 1" – 155:00 (2:35:00)
2. "Part 2" – 119:57 (1:59:57)
3. "Part 3" – 144:54 (2:24:54)
