= Kolsimcha – The World Quintet =

Swiss klezmer band

Kolsimcha – The World Quintet is a Swiss klezmer band.

== History ==
The band was founded in 1986 under the name Kol Simcha in Switzerland as a duo with Josef Bollag and David Klein. Their main interest being focused on the musical genre Klezmer, they played at weddings until their success grew and they started giving concerts. The name Kol Simcha (Kol: voice, Simcha: feast, joy) is taken from a blessing spoken at Jewish weddings and means literally "the voice of joy". This English translation is also the name of their own production company and record label (VOJ).

Over the years the band grew to its current line up of five musicians - Michael Heitzler (clarinet), Olivier Truan (piano), Ariel Zuckermann (flute, previously Roman Glaser and Niki Reiser), Daniel Fricker (double bass), and Christoph Staudenmann (drums, previously Fabian Kuratli (deceased) and David Klein). The band has toured extensively literally all over the world, playing countless concerts, recording several CDs and doing live appearances on radio stations such as BBC.

Kolsimcha – The World Quintet has repeatedly collaborated with classical orchestras such as the highly regarded London Mozart Players, the Munich Radio Orchestra, the Basel Symphony Orchestra and the London Symphony Orchestra. The band provided parts of the film music for Caroline Link's Oscar-nominated drama Beyond Silence in 1998 and composed the entire soundtrack for Xavier Koller's film biography Gripsholm in 2000.

== Discography ==
- Traditional Jewish Music (1990)
- Contemporary Klezmer – Voice of Joy (1993, Hearts of Space Records)
- Crazy Freilach (1996)
- Symphonic Klezmer (1996)
- Klezmer Soul (1997, Hearts of Space Records)
- Live! (2000)
- Gripsholm (Soundtrack) (2000)
- The World Quintet (2003)
- Selma – in Sehnsucht eingehüllt (2005), poems by Selma Meerbaum-Eisinger
- Noah (2007)
- Kolsimcha & London Symphony Orchestra (2013)
