= Other (Lustmord album) =

Studio album by Lustmord
- Released: July 22, 2008
- Genre: Dark ambient
- Length: 78:06
- Label: Hydra Head Records (HH666-157)

Lustmord chronology
Juggernaut (2007)	Other (2008)	"D" Is For Dubby - The Lustmord Dub Mixes (2008)

Other (also stylized as [O T H E R] and other variations) is a 2008 studio album by Brian "Lustmord" Williams, released on Hydra Head Records. [ O T H E R ] was also released as a two disc set on Japanese label Daymare Recordings with the second disc featuring the Lustmord release "Juggernaut" in its entirety.

Professional ratings
Review scores
Source	Rating
AllMusic	3.5/5 stars

== Track listing ==
No.	Title	Length
1.	"Testament"	6:44
2.	"Element"	6:49
3.	"Godeater"	22:42
4.	"Dark Awakening"	8:24
5.	"Ash"	4:04
6.	"Of Eons"	9:12
7.	"Prime [Aversion]"	12:09
8.	"Er Ub Us"	8:03
Total length:		78:06

(All tracks credited to B. Lustmord. Except track 7 credited to B. Lustmord/King Buzzo)

== Personnel ==
- B. Lustmord – sound design
- Adam Jones – guitar on "Godeater", "Dark Awakening" and "Er Ub Us", cover artwork
- Aaron Turner – guitar on "Element"
- King Buzzo – guitar on "Prime [Aversion]"
- Paul Haslinger – additional source sounds on "Godeater"
