= Pivot (album) =

Studio album by Amoeba
- Released: 2000
- Recorded: 1998–1999 at Soundscape Studio in Mountain View, California
- Genre: Art rock
- Length: 49:10
- Label: Relapse Records
- Producer: Robert Rich and Matthew Jacobson

Amoeba chronology
Watchful (1997)	Pivot (2000)

Professional ratings
Review scores
Source	Rating
Allmusic	3/5 stars

Pivot (2000) is an album by the American experimental pop music group Amoeba. The style of this album is similar to that of Amoeba's previous album Watchful (1997) except with a somewhat more active and direct approach. The lyrics are also more literal and emotional than those of Watchful.

== Track listing ==
1. ”Fireflies” - 3:47
2. ”No Empty Promises” - 4:34
3. ”Traces” - 4:43
4. ”Pivot” - 4:24
5. ”Moonlight Flowers” - 3:40
6. ”House of Rust” - 1:17
7. ”Harvest” - 4:42
8. ”Miniature” - 2:09
9. ”Seasons Passing” - 5:01
10. ”Underground” - 5:30
11. ”Sparks” - 4:34
12. ”To Other Days” - 4:15

== Personnel ==
- Robert Rich - vocals, piano, harmonium, synthesizers, lap steel guitar, flutes
- Rick Davies - electric and acoustic guitars

with:

- Don Swanson - drums
- Andrew McGowan - bass
- Hans Christian - cello
- BobDog Catlin - megaptera vina (track 10)
- Forrest Fang - violin (track 11)
- Tom Heasley - tuba (tracks 3 and 11)
