= Alio Die =

Italian music composer and producer

- Also known as: Alio Die
- Born: Stefano Musso
- Origin: Milan, Italy
- Genres: Ambient; Drone ambient
- Labels: Hic Sunt Leones; Projekt
- Website: www.aliodie.com

Alio Die is the stage name of Stefano Musso, an Italian ambient-music composer and producer. Stefano Musso studied art and electronics in Milan, Italy, and began performing music in 1989.

== Overview ==
His music is a fusion of acoustical elements, samples, echoing percussion, and deep, atmospheric sound design with elements of entropic formlessness. Alio Die's style has a lot in common with traditional Indian raga music in building an entire song from a simple, continuous starting tone.

Label Press wrote the following about him:

Natural and acoustic sounds and selected noises, electronically treated and reworked, are integrated in a meditative and spiritual context that often, in the feeling, becomes close to a prayer. Visible static, this music is rich of hidden sounds, layers of elements to discover at each listening. Alio Die's music, in the consciousness space that creates, it's a melting of technology and mysticism, like a new ritual with echoes of a medieval time, deep and grounded in introspection.

== Discography ==
=== Solo albums ===
- 1991, Introspective
- 1992, Under An Holy Ritual
- 1996, Suspended Feathers
- 1997, The Hidden Spring
- 1998, Password For Entheogenic Experience
- 1999, Le Stanze Della Transcendenza
- 2001, Incantamento
- 2001, Leaves Net
- 2003, Il Tempo Magico Di Saturnia Pavonia
- 2003, Khen Introduce Silence
- 2004, Angel's Fly Souvenir
- 2004, Sol Niger
- 2006, The Flight Of Real Image
- 2008, Aura Seminalis
- 2008, Tempus Rei
- 2010, Tripudium Naturae
- 2010, Horas Tibi Serenas
- 2011, Honeysuckle
- 2012, Deconsecrated & Pure
- 2014, Sitar Meditations
- 2015, Standing In A Place
- 2016, Imaginal Symmetry
- 2016, An Unfathomable Convergence
- 2016, Seamlessly Bliss
- 2017, They Grow Layers of Life Within
- 2017, Time Zone Portal
- 2018, Kalisz Concert
- 2019, Allegorical Traces, Pt.1

=== Collaboration albums ===
- 1997, Fissures (with Robert Rich)
- 1999, Healing Herb's Spirit (with Antonio Testa)
- 1999, Echo Passage (with Vidna Obmana)
- 2000, Aquam Metallicam (with Nick Parkin)
- 2001, Apsaras (with Amelia Cuni)
- 2002, Expanding Horizon (with Mathias Grassow)
- 2002, Prayer For The Forest (with Antonio Testa)
- 2003, The Sleep Of Seeds (with Saffron Wood)
- 2003, Sunja (with Zeit)
- 2004, Angel's Fly Souvenir (with Francesco Paladino)
- 2005, Il Sogno Di Un Piano Veneziano A Parigi (with Festina Lente)
- 2005, Aqua Planing (with Werner Durand)
- 2005, Mei-Jyu (with Jack Or Jive)
- 2006, Corteggiando Le Messi (with Saffron Wood)
- 2007, End Of An Era (with Luciano Daini)
- 2007, Sospensione D'Estate (with James Johnson)
- 2007, Raag Drone Theory (with Zeit)
- 2008, Eleusian Lullaby (with Martina Galvagni)
- 2009, Private History Of The Clouds (with Aglaia)
- 2010, Circo Divino (with Parallel Worlds)
- 2010, Il Giardino Ermeneutico (with Zeit)
- 2010, Praha Meditations (with Mathias Grassow)
- 2011, Vayu Rouah (with Aglaia)
- 2012, Otter Songs (with Lingua Fungi)
- 2012, Rêverie (with Antonio Testa)
- 2013, A Circular Quest (with Zeit)
- 2014, Amidst The Circling Spires (with Sylvi Alli)
- 2014, Elusive Metaphor (with Parallel Worlds)
- 2015, Holographic Codex (with Lorenzo Montanà)
- 2017, Lento (with Lingua Fungi)
- 2017, Opera Magnetica (with Aglaia)
- 2018, Amitabha (with Aglaia)
- 2019, Tempus Fugit (with Indalaska)
