= Amoeba (band) =

Experimental music group

Amoeba is an experimental music group that fuses the pop and ambient music genres. They formed in California, United States, in 1992. The core members of the group are ambient musician Robert Rich and guitarist/bassist Rick Davies.

Rich and Davies have worked together since 1979. Davies had just returned to the United States after working with several experimental rock groups in the United Kingdom and Spain. During the next five years, Rich and Davies worked on several collaborative projects. The style of these projects was an aggressive blend of art rock and pure avant-garde composition.

In 1983 Rich and Davies formed a trio with bassist Andrew McGowan called Urdu. Urdu performed several concerts in the San Francisco Bay Area. One of their last performances was a live radio broadcast in 1984. Some of their recorded material was released as a self-titled album on cassette in 1985.

In 1992 the first version of Amoeba formed. It was a quartet featuring Robert Rich, Andrew McGowan, guitarist David Hahn and drummer Matt Isaacson. They released a five-song EP-CD in 1993 titled Eye Catching. This lineup dissolved soon after the release of Eye Catching.

In 1994 Rick Davies came to Rich with some of his new musical ideas. They were slow folk inspired pop compositions with strong ambient sensibilities. They decided to incorporate these ideas into a new version of Amoeba. This lineup featured Rich on vocals, synthesizers, percussion, lap steel guitar and flutes and Davies on guitars and bass. They developed a style consisting of slow, hypnotic and largely acoustic pop compositions and Rich's classic ambient textures and acoustic recordings. Their lyrics range from abstract to darkly emotional. This form of Amoeba has released two albums, Watchful (1997) and Pivot (2000). Each of these albums features a number of guest performers including cellist and multi-instrumentalist Hans Christian.

After the release of Pivot Davies went on to pursue his solo career in Tucson, Arizona. Rich continues to release ambient solo albums and tour at a prolific rate. Both musicians continue to hold a future Amoeba project as a possibility, though there are difficulties due to the geographic distance between them.

== Discography ==
- 1993: Eye Catching
- 1997: Watchful
- 2000: Pivot
