= Geometry (Robert Rich album) =

Studio album by Robert Rich
- Released: 1991
- Recorded: 1986–87 in Menlo Park, California
- Genre: Ambient
- Length: 68:00
- Label: Spalax
- Producer: Robert Rich

Robert Rich chronology
Gaudí (1991)	Geometry (1991)	Soma (1992)

Professional ratings
Review scores
Source	Rating
Allmusic	4/5 stars

Geometry (1991) is an album by the American ambient and electronic musician Robert Rich. Although completed in 1988, this album was not released until three years later.

This album is more active and structured than any of his previous works. The music was inspired in part by the complex patterns of Islamic designs like those found at the Alhambra, and features complex just intonation. The first three tracks consist of complex layered sequences of electronic notes in rich, organic-sounding chime tones. Rich revisited this style in Gaudí (1991) and Electric Ladder (2006). Tracks 4 through 7 are slow textures that more common to Robert Rich's work. The album ends with another active piece similar to the first three tracks.

Tracks 1, 2, 4 and 8 were mixed by Robert Rich and future collaborator Steve Roach at Roach's studio in Venice, California. This album was released in a two CD set with Numena in 1997.

== Track listing ==
1. "Primes, Part 1" – 5:20
2. "Primes, Part 2" – 6:34
3. "Interlocking Circles" – 12:35
4. "Geometry of the Skies" 13:48
5. "Nesting Ground" – 6:13
6. "Geomancy" – 10:35
7. "Amrita (Water of Life)" – 6:39
8. "Logos" – 9:57
