= Night Sky Replies =

EP by Robert Rich
- Released: 1994
- Genre: Ambient
- Length: 20:20
- Label: Amplexus
- Producer: Robert Rich

Robert Rich chronology
Trances/Drones (1994)	Night Sky Replies (1994)	Yearning (1995)

Night Sky Replies (1994) is a limited edition mini album by the American ambient musician Robert Rich. It is a continuous 20+ minute piece divided into four movements.

This album was released by the Italian label, Amplexus, which specializes in limited edition mini CDs by notable ambient artists like Steve Roach, Vidna Obmana and Michael Stearns. In 1996 “Night Sky Replies” became the final track on Rich’s compilation album A Troubled Resting Place.

== Track listing ==
1. ”A Ripple of Sand” – 3:22
2. ”Night Spinning Inward” – 6:28
3. ”A Wheel Questions the Ground” – 7:10
4. ”The Night Sky Replies” – 4:20
