= Trances/Drones =

Compilation album by Robert Rich
- Released: 1994
- Recorded: December 19, 1981, in Menlo Park, California; 1981 in Palo Alto, California; January 31, 1983, at Stanford University; April 1983 at Stanford University; July 17, 1983, in Encinada, Mexico; August 20, 1983, in Menlo Park, California; November 1983; and December 17, 1983, at Stanford University
- Genre: Ambient, drone
- Length: 141:11
- Label: Extreme Records; Release/Relapse Records (reissue)
- Producer: Robert Rich

Robert Rich chronology
Propagation (1994)	Trances/Drones (1994)	Night Sky Replies (1994)

Alternative cover
- 2000 re-release

Professional ratings
Review scores
Source	Rating
Allmusic	4/5 stars

Trances/Drones (1994) is an album by the American ambient musician Robert Rich. It is a two-disc compilation of Rich's drone music albums Trances (1983) and Drones (1983) plus other material that was recorded during that time.

== Overview ==
Disc one contains the album Trances, plus the title track from Rich's 1982 debut Sunyata. At the time this compilation was released, Sunyata was only available in its original 86-minute cassette release and had been out of print for several years. When the album Sunyata was re-released in 2000 on compact disc, this title track was omitted because of the CD's 81-minute length restriction.

Disc two contains the album Drones, plus a previously unreleased track titled “Resonance,” which was recorded at Stanford University on January 31, 1983. The liner notes describe this piece as an "acoustic room resonance derived from delayed feedback".

== Track listing ==
=== Disc one: Trances ===
1. ”Cave Paintings” – 23:54
2. ”Hayagriva” – 25:13
3. ”Sunyata (Emptiness)” – 22:50

=== Disc two: Drones ===
1. ”Seascape” – 29:59
2. ”Wheel of Earth” – 27:58
3. ”Resonance” – 12:17
