= David Wright (British musician) =

British musician, born 1953

David Wright (born 24 October 1953 in Kent, England), is the English keyboard player and composer, who founded the new-age music label AD Music in 1989. He is also co-founder of the New Age electronic rock band Code Indigo and of the new-age music duo Callisto.

Wright has released many instrumental albums as a solo performer, establishing a strong reputation in Europe and the United States.

== Discography ==
=== Solo albums ===
- 1989 – Reflections
- 1990 – Romancing the Moon
- 1991 – Waiting for the Soundtrack
- 1991 – Marilynmba
- 1992 – Between Realities
- 1993 – Ocean Watch
- 1994 – Moments in Time
- 1995 – Dissimilar Views
- 1997 – Live at the London Planetarium
- 1998 – Three Six Zero
- 2000 – The Hypnosis Concert (from 4-CD Box set Blue)
- 2002 – Walking with Ghosts
- 2003 – Dissimilar Views 2
- 2004 – Continuum
- 2005 – Returning Tides – Best of 1989–2004
- 2005 – Deeper
- 2006 – The Tenth Planet
- 2008 – Momentum
- 2008 – Dreams and Distant Moonlight
- 2009 – Sines of life Vol 1
- 2009 – Sines of life Vol 2 (double)
- 2011 – The Spirit of Light (Compilation)
- 2011 – In Search of Silence
- 2012 – Connected
- 2014 – Beyond the Airwaves Vol. 1
- 2015 – Beyond the Airwaves Vol. 2
- 2017 – Walking with Ghosts (the Remixes ep)
- 2018 – Stranger Days (double)
- 2019 – Beyond the Airwaves Vol. 3
- 2020 – The BBC Derby Concert (1994) DVD
- 2021 – The Lost Colony (enhanced CD)
- 2022 – Returning Tides – Best of 2005–2022
- 2024 – Fade
- 2026 – Invocations (Live)

=== Band albums ===
Code Indigo

- 1995 – For Whom the Bell
- 1997 – Live in Duisburg
- 1998 – Uforia
- 1999 – Live at Derby Cathedral (Album Blue)
- 2003 – TimeCode
- 2006 – Chill
- 2007 – In Concert (double)
- 2013 – MELTdown
- 2013 – Meltdown Concert DVD @ Eday (DVD-r)
- 2014 – Take the Money and Run
- 2025 – The E-Scape Concert (double)
- 2025 – Endgame (double compilation)

With Carys

- 2017 – Prophecy
- 2018 – Schwingungen Live (DVD)
- 2019 – Call to Me (iTunes single)
- 2023 – Oracle

With Robert Fox & Code Indigo

- 2000 – Blue
- 2003 – Before Time (Double CDr) (Music for the Code Indigo album TimeCode)

Callisto (With Dave Massey/Stephan Whitlan)

- 2004 – Signal to the Stars
- 2009 – Live at The Hampshire Jam (CDr)
- 2010 – NYX
- 2022 – The Reflecting Sky
- 2024 – Either Side of Reality

Trinity (with Neil Fellowes & Nigel Turner-Heffer)

- 2011 – Music for Angels

With Ian Boddy

- 2009 – Shifting Sands

With Ian Boddy & Klaus Hoffmann-Hoock

- 2010 – Trinity (Double CDr)

With Enterphase

- 2004 – Solar Promenades

Featured compilations

- 1995 – Music for Films Polygram
- 1998 – Dream & Relaxing Music New Sounds
- 1998 – Nuova Era New Sounds
- 1999 – Magic Mysteries Sony Music
- 1999 – Fantastica1999 Polygram
- 2001 – Mystic Spirits Vol 3 ZYX
- 2003 – Beyond The Skies Volume 1 Shift ZYX
- 2004 – Various Artists Ocean of Light
- 2004 – New Age Sounds Accordo
- 2004 – Cafe Oriental 3 ZYX
- 2004 – Best of Beyond the Skies Shift Music
- 2005 – Sacred Skies
- 2005 – Gregorian Dreams Volume 2 More Music
- 2007 – Mystic Spirits Classic Edition 6 ZYX
- 2007 – Mystic Spirits Vol 4 DVD ZYX
- 2008 – Mystica – ZYX
- 2008 – Gregorian Chants Greatest Hits ZYX
- 2009 – Beyond Paradise AD Music
- 2009 – Mystic Spirits Elements of Mystery ZYX
- 2009 – Walking with Angels AD Music
- 2009 – Gregorian Chants Sanctus ZYX
- 2010 – Night Music AD Music
- 2010 – ChristmasAD The First Snow AD Music
- 2011 – A Little More Night MusicAD Music

Producer:

- 1996 – Bekki Williams Elysian Fields
- 1998 – Bekki Williams Shadow of the Wind
- 2004 – Various Artists Ocean of Light
- 2005 – Various Artists Sacred Skies
- 2008 – Uriel – Cultures
- 2009 – Various Artists Beyond Paradise
- 2009 – Various Artists Walking with Angels
- 2010 – Claudio Merlini The Colours of Music
- 2010 – Various Artists Night Music
- 2011 – Various Artists A little More Night Music
- 2010 – Various Artists ChristmasAD The First Snow
- 2012 – Dreamerproject The Road to Your Heart
- 2014 – Bekki Williams Shadow of the Wind Remaster
- 2014 – Iotronica of Moons and Stars
