= Rainforest (album) =

Studio album by Robert Rich
- Released: 1989
- Recorded: 1988–89 at Soundscape Studio and The Lobby in San Francisco, California
- Genre: Ambient
- Length: 53:11
- Label: Hearts of Space
- Producer: Robert Rich

Robert Rich chronology
Numena (1987)	Rainforest (1989)	Strata (1990)

Professional ratings
Review scores
Source	Rating
Allmusic	3/5 stars

Rainforest (1989) is an album by the U.S. ambient musician Robert Rich. The inspiration for this album came when Rich traveled through the rainforests of the American Pacific Northwest. Seeing the lush beauty of that environment contrasted by the devastation caused by clear-cut logging filled the artist with a sense of urgency. A portion of the proceeds from this album goes to the Rainforest Action Network, a non-profit organization set up to protect the world's rainforests.

In this album, Rich continues to explore deeper into a rhythmic and organic style which began with Numena (1987). Several pieces carry a pronounced gamelan influence. The most experimental track on the album is a piece titled "The Raining Room", dedicated to the Russian filmmaker Andrei Tarkovsky.

This was Robert Rich's first album released on Hearts of Space Records.

== Track listing ==
1. "Mbira" – 4:11
2. "Rainforest Suite"
  - a. "The Forest Dreams of Bach" – 5:45
  - b. "Drumsong" – 4:41
  - c. "Surface" – 5:54
3. "Sanctuary" – 6:24
4. "Temple of Eyes" – 5:19
5. "The Raining Room" – 6:51
6. "Veil of Mist" – 10:38
7. "A Passage in Bronze" – 3:30

== Personnel ==
- Robert Rich – sampler, synthesizers, Israeli and Persian doumbec goblet drums, bamboo flutes, ocarina, lap steel guitar, percussion
- Andrew MacGowan – fretless bass (track 1)
- Carter Scholz – bonang gong percussion (track 9)
