= Strata (Robert Rich and Steve Roach album) =

Studio album by Robert Rich and Steve Roach
- Released: August 20, 1990
- Recorded: 1989–90 at The Timeroom in Tucson, Arizona and Soundscape Studio in Mountain View, California
- Genre: Ambient
- Length: 58:47
- Label: Hearts of Space Records
- Producer: Robert Rich and Steve Roach

Robert Rich chronology
Rainforest (1989)	Strata (1990)	Gaudí (1991)

Steve Roach chronology
Desert Solitaire (1989)	Strata (1990)	Australia: Sound of the Earth (1990)

Professional ratings
Review scores
Source	Rating
Allmusic	4.5/5 stars

Strata is a collaborative album by the U.S. ambient musicians Robert Rich and Steve Roach. Robert Rich's influence on this album is strong, with complicated mixes featuring various acoustic sound sources and Rich's own brand of organic synthesis called "glurp". The two artists collaborated again (with the credits in the reverse order) on their 1992 album Soma.

There is a strong sense of surrealism throughout the album. The seventh track's title refers to The Persistence of Memory by Salvador Dalí, who died in 1989 when recording of this album began, and to whom the piece is dedicated.

== Track listing ==
1. "Fearless" – 4:32
2. "Mica" – 5:00
3. "Forever" – 4:50
4. "The Grotto of Time Lost" – 9:03
5. "Iguana" (7:23)
6. "Magma" (3:37)
7. "Persistence of Memory (for Dali)" – 5:09
8. "Remembrance" – 2:22
9. "Ceremony of Shadows" – 6:12
10. "La Luna" – 10:39
