= Paradise Disowned =

Studio album by Lustmord
- Released: 1986
- Recorded: Winter 1983–1984 at the crypt of Chartres cathedral; the cave at Craig Y Ddinas; the deep shelter in Crewe; Dunster abattoir, Bangor and the original site of Beldam.
- Genre: Dark ambient, industrial, experimental
- Length: 45:09
- Label: Side Effects, Soleilmoon
- Producer: Lustmord

Lustmord chronology
Vhutemas / Arechetypi (1985)	Paradise Disowned (1986)	Machine Gun (1988)

Alternative Cover
- Reissued in 2000 Cover

Professional ratings
Review scores
Source	Rating
Allmusic	4/5 stars

Paradise Disowned is an album by the Welsh ambient musician Lustmord, released in 1986. Unlike his later albums, this album is produced with conventional instrumentation (vocals, pipes, percussion, and "machinery"), containing drone textures. Soleilmoon reissued this album in 2000, updating the cover art.

== Track listing ==
No.	Title	Length
1.	"Beckoning"	4:07
2.	"Uterance"	5:51
3.	"Dreams of Dead Names"	2:42
4.	"Pyre (Necro Cristi)"	5:56
5.	"Purge (Banashing)"	3:49
6.	"Terror Against Terror"	5:02
7.	"Comahon Q.Q. Comahon"	6:16
8.	"735"	4:06
9.	"Pure"	7:15

== Personnel ==
Adapted from Discogs

- Michael Wells – artwork
- David Black – cover
- Roy Batty – drum programming, noises
- Ach Topkaf – location engineer
- Aleister Farrent – mixing engineer
- James Bradell – recording engineer
- Kevin Metcalfe – mastering
- Isolrubin BK – noises, location recordings tape
- John Murphy – noises, electronics, loops, voice, gong, shawm, musical bow
- Lustmørd – noises, electronics, pipe, machinery, voice, gong, cover, location recordings tape
- Dr N. Newby-Carter – deep sea recordings tape
