= Yearning (album) =

Studio album by Robert Rich and Lisa Moskow
- Released: 1995
- Recorded: 1994 at Soundscape Studio in Mountain View, California
- Genre: Ambient, electro-acoustic
- Length: 59:36
- Label: Fathom/Hearts of Space Records
- Producer: Robert Rich

Robert Rich chronology
Night Sky Replies (1994)	Yearning (1995)	Stalker (1995)

Lisa Moskow chronology
These Still Waters: Music for Reflection (1994)	Yearning (1995)	Sojurn (2004)

Professional ratings
Review scores
Source	Rating
Allmusic	2.5/5 stars

Yearning (1995) is a collaborative album by ambient musician Robert Rich and sarod player Lisa Moskow. It is based on the classical Indian musical form known as alap. Alap is the first and slowest section of a raga. The music on this album consists of Moskow’s sarod solos set against Rich’s classic droning ambiences.

== Track listing ==
1. ”part 1: Bija” – 10:30
2. ”part 2: Suspension” – 9:50
3. ”part 3: Nada” – 8:50
4. ”part 4: Kali” – 7:50
5. ”part 5: A Thousand Tears” – 11:40
6. ”part 6: The Mirror” – 10:56

== Personnel ==
- Robert Rich – flutes, electronics, gliss guitar, santur, percussion, sound design
- Lisa Moskow – sarod
