= Seven Veils (Robert Rich album) =

Studio album by Robert Rich
- Released: August 18, 1998
- Recorded: July 1996 – September 1997 at Soundscape Studio
- Genre: Ambient, world fusion, electronic
- Length: 60:35
- Label: Hearts of Space
- Producer: Robert Rich

Robert Rich chronology
| Below Zero (1998) | Seven Veils (1998) | Humidity (2000) |

Professional ratings
Review scores
| Source | Rating |
|---|---|
| Allmusic | link |

Seven Veils (1998) is an album by the U.S. ambient musician Robert Rich. It is inspired by Arab culture and music. This album has a heightened emphasis on rhythms, from guitar and percussion. All pieces except track 3 were composed in just intonation. Guests include David Torn on guitar and Hans Christian on cello. Ranked by Allmusic as one of Rich's best albums, it was praised as, "This Muslim psychedelia is a must for every shrinking world audiophile."

== Track listing ==
1. "Coils" – 6:03
2. "Alhambra" – 10:09
3. "Talisman of Touch" – 4:52
4. "Book of Ecstasy" – 15:03
  1. "A Silken Thread" – 5:07
  2. "A Hungry Moon" – 4:00
  3. "A Veiled Oasis" – 5:56
5. "Ibn Sina" – 8:33
6. "Dissolve" – 5:34
7. "Lapis" – 10:19

All compositions by Robert Rich. Titles: 2 refers to the Alhambra, 5 to Ibn Sina, and 6 to Lapis.

== Personnel ==
Musical

- Robert Rich – synthesizers, samplers, drums & percussion, bamboo and PVC flutes, lap steel guitar, rubberband marimba, dulcimer, waterphone, "glurp"

with

- David Torn – guitar (tracks 2 and 4)
- Andrew McGowan – bass (track 2)
- Forrest Fang – violin (track 3)
- Hans Christian – cello (track 4 and 7)
- Mark Forry – Balkan kaval (track 6)

Technical

- Recording, mixing: Robert Rich
- Mastering: Bob Olhsson, Robert Rich

Graphical

- Cover photo: Robert Holmes (Sausalito)
- Artist photo: Brad Cole
- Art direction: Stephen Hill
- Design: Stephen Hill, Jeremy Hulette

== Sources ==
- Allmusic. "Seven Veils"
- Rich, Robert (1998). "CD liner notes" in Seven Veils, San Francisco: Hearts of Space Records, August 18, 1998, SKU HS11086, EAN 0025041108621 (UPC 025041108621)
