= A Troubled Resting Place =

Compilation album by Robert Rich
- Released: 1996
- Recorded: January 1993 – July 1995 at Soundscape Studio
- Genre: Ambient, dark ambient
- Length: 65:52
- Label: Fathom/Hearts of Space Records
- Producer: Robert Rich

Robert Rich chronology
Stalker (1995)	A Troubled Resting Place (1996)	Fissures (1997)

Professional ratings
Review scores
Source	Rating
Allmusic	link

A Troubled Resting Place (1996) is a compilation album by the American ambient musician Robert Rich. The first five tracks were originally released on multi-artist compilations. The sixth and final track is Rich’s 1994 mini-CD release Night Sky Replies.

In spite of the wide variety of sources of the material in this compilation, there is a constant style throughout the album. It consists of dark, turbulent organic atmospheres.

== Track listing ==
1. ”The Simorgh Sleeps on Velvet Tongues” – 10:14
  (Originally released on The Throne of Drones, 1995.)
2. ”Calling by Stormlight” – 5:10
  (Originally released on Twilight Earth II, 1995.)
3. ”Buoyant on Motionless Deluge” – 8:00
  (Originally released on Swarm of Drones, 1995.)
4. ”Bioelectric Plasma” – 16:42
  (Originally released on DeepNet, 1996.)
5. ”Black Skies” – 5:19
  (Originally released on The Promises of Silences, 1993)
6. ”Night Sky Replies”
  1. ”A Ripple of Sand” – 3:22
  2. ”Night Spinning Inward” – 6:28
  3. A Wheel Questions the Ground” – 7:10
  4. ”The Night Sky Replies” – 4:20
  (Originally released on Night Sky Replies, 1994)
