= Bestiary (Robert Rich album) =

Studio album by Robert Rich
- Released: 2001
- Genre: Ambient, electronic, experimental
- Length: 53:09
- Label: Relapse Records
- Producer: Robert Rich

Robert Rich chronology
Somnium (2001)	Bestiary (2001)	Outpost (2002)

Professional ratings
Review scores
Source	Rating
Allmusic	link

Bestiary is a 2001 album by the American ambient musician Robert Rich. This album showcases the musical concept that Rich has long referred to as “glurp”. It evokes a frenetic and surreal landscape inhabited by a wide variety of bizarre organisms.

Work on this album began while Rich was working to create a library of Acid Loops for the Sonic Foundry company. He had previously created an Acid Loop library in 1999 called Liquid Planet. In this project Rich began creating a library of unusual sounds with his new MOTM modular synthesizer. As the synthesizer grew, Rich became increasingly impressed by its potential and decided to abandon the Acid Loop project in favor of creating a new album. MIDI played an extremely limited role in this album as most of its material was recorded live to hard disc with the audio feature of the Cubase program. It was then assembled into a continuous 53 minute audio file.

== Track listing ==
All tracks by Robert Rich

1. ”Mantis Intentions” – 8:00
2. ”Nesting on Cliffsides” – 12:46
3. ”Dante’s Anthropomorphic Zoo” – 3:06
4. ”Bestiary” – 6:17
5. ”Carapace Hides the Delicacy” – 3:12
6. ”Folded Space” – 5:34
7. ”Sharpening Her Talons” – 3:51
8. ”Premonition of Circular Clouds” – 10:21

== Personnel ==
- Robert Rich – MOTM modular synthesizer, lap steel guitar, processed acoustic sources, “glurp”
- Forrest Fang – Marxolin (track 3), hichiriki (track 8)
- Andrew McGowan – bass (tracks 3 and 5)
- Haroun Serang – guitar (tracks 1 and 7)
