= Gaudí (Robert Rich album) =

Studio album by Robert Rich
- Released: 1991
- Recorded: 1990–91 at Soundscape Studio in Mountain View, California
- Genre: Ambient
- Length: 57:24
- Label: Hearts of Space
- Producer: Robert Rich

Robert Rich chronology
Strata (1990)	Gaudí (1991)	Geometry (1991)

Professional ratings
Review scores
Source	Rating
Allmusic	link

Gaudí (1991) is an album by the American ambient musician Robert Rich. It is a tribute to the Spanish architect Antoni Gaudí (June 25, 1852 – June 10, 1926). It is a stylistic mix of active tonal sequences and slower ambient pieces that Rich first explored in the mid-1980s when he recorded Geometry.

== Track listing ==
1. "Sagrada Família" – 4:24
2. "Tracery" – 4:35
3. "Silhouette" – 4:04
4. "The Spiral Steps" – 9:46
5. "Harmonic Clouds" – 8:49
6. "Air" – 4:42
7. "Serpent" – 6:27
8. "Minaret" – 6:02
9. "Mosaic" – 8:26

== Personnel ==
- Robert Rich – analog and digital synthesizers, samplers, lap steel guitar, bamboo and ceramic flutes, dumbek, Udu, talking drum, Waterphone, “glurp”
- Pranesh Khan – tabla (track 2)
