= Ancient Future (group) =

Ancient Future is a musical ensemble popular in the world music genre. Founded in San Rafael, in the Bay Area of Northern California, United States in 1978, it is one of the fusion subcategory of world fusion music, blending centuries-old music traditions, along with mixing them with modern music, such as jazz, rock or reggae. The band leader is Matthew Montfort.

== General ==
Formed in late 1978 by Matthew Montfort, Ancient Future coined the term "world fusion music" to describe its use of Indian, African, Balinese, Middle Eastern, and South American rhythms, the rich harmonies of Europe, the peaceful melodies of Asia, and other musical traditions within a contemporary framework. Montfort, the group's guitarist, became fascinated by North Indian classical music during his college years, prompting him to travel to Java, Bali, China, and elsewhere in Asia to study the intricacies of their musical traditions. Over the years, Ancient Future has expanded its musical vision through collaborations with noted masters of various world music traditions who are now an integral part of what is today more than just a band; Ancient Future has grown to become a large chamber ensemble of 28 performers from around the world with over a dozen similar ensembles within it, enabling Ancient Future to realize its core mission of creating world fusion music.

== Style ==
The original U.S. members of Ancient Future looked beyond their roots for inspiration by studying with master musicians of many world music traditions, from Balinese gamelan director Madé Gerindem to North Indian sarod master Ali Akbar Khan. They use their knowledge of world music to create something new and uniquely their own that is respected by pundits from other cultures whose traditions are a part of the mix. Ancient Future also mixes together ancient music traditions together modern music forms, such as jazz, rock, reggae, and others.

== Legacy and influence ==
Through cross cultural exchange and collaboration, Ancient Future has created a rich musical world of tradition and innovation. In addition to their original music based on world traditions, the many ensemble variations also perform traditional music from the cultures of the individual master musicians who perform with the band. This provides an educational experience for the audience that is intended to excite people about world traditions and show how those traditions can make contemporary culture richer.
