= Outpost (Robert Rich and Ian Boddy album) =

Studio album by Robert Rich and Ian Boddy
- Released: 2002
- Recorded: October 2001 at Soundscape Studio and November 2001 at DiN Studios
- Genre: Ambient, experimental, electronic, avant-garde
- Length: 58:50
- Label: DiN
- Producer: Robert Rich and Ian Boddy

Robert Rich chronology
Bestiary (2001)	Outpost (2002)	Temple of the Invisible (2003)

Ian Boddy chronology
Triptych (2001)	Outpost (2002)	Aurora (2002)

Professional ratings
Review scores
Source	Rating
Allmusic	link

Outpost (2002) is a collaborative album by electronic musicians Robert Rich and Ian Boddy. Recording of this album began during a week in October, 2001 while Boddy was visiting Rich's studio in California. It was completed in November when Rich visited Boddy's studio in Northern England. It was mixed, assembled and mastered by Robert Rich in January, 2002. The track titles follow a science fiction theme of space exploration. This album was released as a limited edition of 2000 copies.

== Track listing ==
1. ”First Outpost” – 1:31
2. ”Ice Fields” – 8:21
3. ”Methane” – 3:48
4. ”Lagrange Point” – 6:48
5. ”Link Lost” – 10:15
6. ”State of Flux” – 6:38
7. ”Tuning In” – 5:47
8. ”Tuning Out” – 6:54
9. ”Edge of Nowhere” – 6:25
10. ”Last Outpost” – 2:18

== Personnel ==
- Robert Rich – MOTM modular synthesizer, lap steel guitar, flutes, percussion
- Ian Boddy – analog and digital synthesizers, prepared piano, Metasynth, Pluggo
