= Stalker (album) =

Studio album by Robert Rich and B. Lustmord
- Released: 21 November 1995
- Recorded: 1994–95
- Studio: Soundscape Studio
- Genre: Dark ambient, electronic
- Length: 68:27
- Label: Fathom/Hearts of Space Records
- Producer: Robert Rich and B. Lustmord

Robert Rich chronology
Yearning (1995)	Stalker (1995)	A Troubled Resting Place (1996)

B. Lustmord chronology
Trans Plutonion Transmissions (1994)	Stalker (1995)	Strange Attractor / Black Star (1996)

Professional ratings
Review scores
Source	Rating
Allmusic	link

Stalker is a collaborative album by ambient musicians Robert Rich and B. Lustmord. It was inspired by the 1979 Soviet film of the same name, directed by Andrei Tarkovsky. The cover image is a photograph by landscape photographer Brad Cole. It is a work from 1988 titled Remnants of Resonance 2.

== Track listing ==
No.	Title	Length
1.	"Elemental Trigger"	6:07
2.	"Synergistic Perceptions"	11:04
3.	"Hidden Refuge"	9:36
4.	"Delusion Fields"	9:31
5.	"Omnipresent Boundary"	15:01
6.	"Undulating Terrain"	5:35
7.	"A Point of No Return"	11:29
Total length:		68:27
