= Rainstick =

South American percussion instrument

Chilean Rainstick
- sound of a rainstick
- Classification: percussion instrument
- Hornbostel–Sachs classification: 112.13+133.1 (vessel rattle with friction)
- Inventor(s): Multiple possible origins: best known is the Mapuche design; similar instruments in Southeast Asia, Africa and Australia

Related instruments
- Hosho, Maracas, Vibraslap

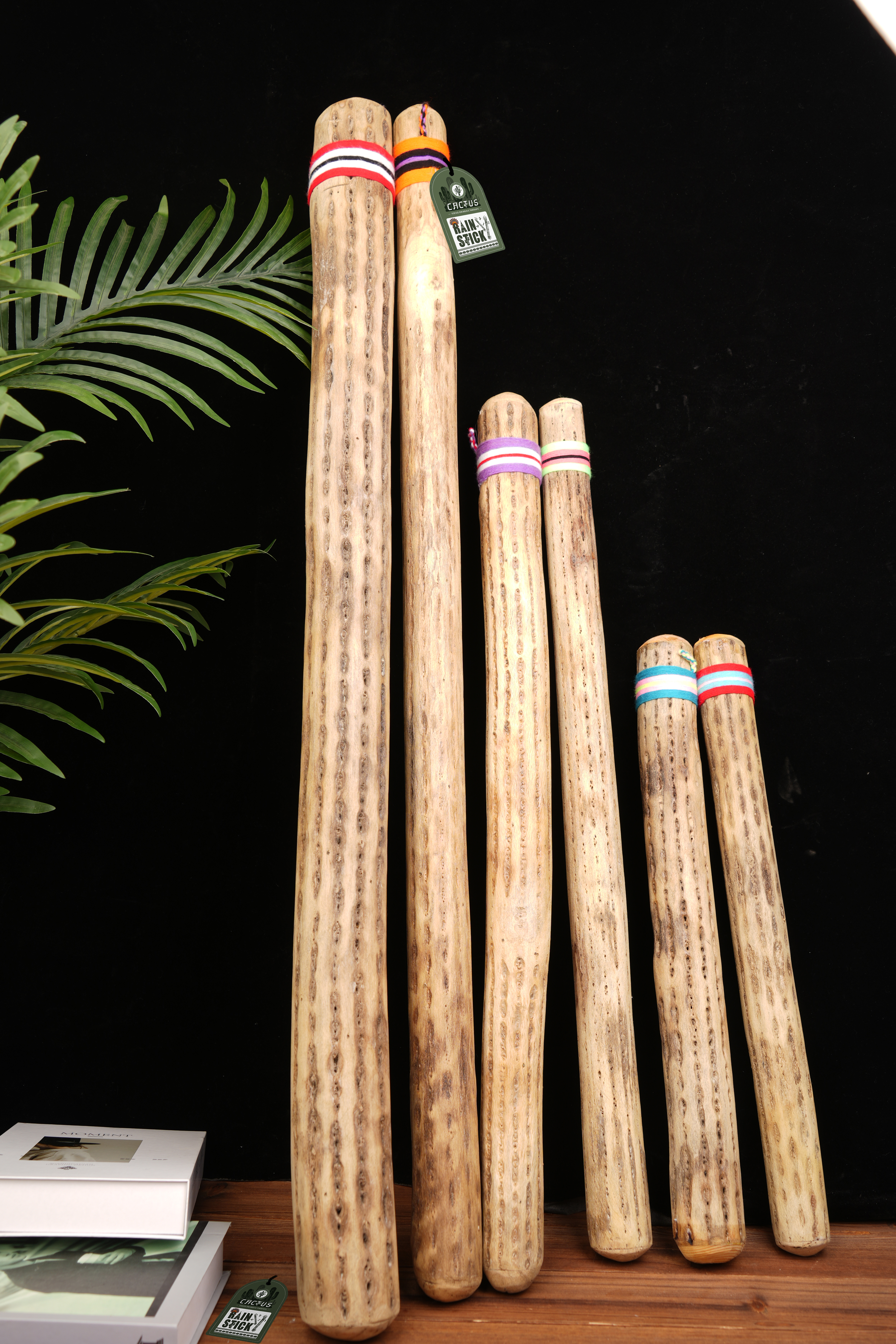
Traditional cactus rainsticks

A rainstick is a long, hollow tube of bamboo or dried cactus that is partially flooded with small pebbles, rice, dried beans, or other hard granular matter. The inside surface of the tube has small pins or thorns arranged helically. When the stick is rotated and held upright, the pebbles fall to the other end of the tube, bouncing off the internal protrusions to create a sound reminiscent of falling rain.

In South America, rainsticks are believed to have been invented by the Mapuche, and was played in the belief it could bring about rainstorms. It was also found further north on the coasts of Chile, potentially having also been used by the Incas. Mapuche rainsticks are usually made from any of several species of cactus such as Eulychnia acida and Echinopsis pachanoi. The cacti, which are hollow, are dried in the sun. The spines are removed, then driven into the cactus like nails. Pebbles or other small objects are placed inside the rainsticks, and the ends are sealed.

Variants of the instrument can also be found in Southeast Asia, Central Asia, Australia and Africa, where it was developed independently, and is often made using bamboo rather than dried cactus.

Rainsticks may also be made with common household materials like paper towel rolls instead of cactus, and nails or toothpicks instead of thorns, and they are often sold to tourists visiting parts of Latin America and also the Southwestern United States (which has a history of Spanish and Mexican cultural influence).
