= Robert Rich (musician) =

American ambient musician and composer (born 1963)

- Born: August 23, 1963 (age 63)
- Origin: Mountain View, California, U.S.
- Genres: Ambient, new-age, electronic, experimental
- Years active: 1981–present
- Labels: Soundscape, Fathom/Hearts of Space, Hypnos, Relapse/Release, Extreme, DiN, Unsung, Soleilmoon, Projekt, Sombient/Asphodel, Crowd Control Activities
- Website: robertrich.com

Robert Rich (born August 23, 1963) is an ambient musician and composer based in California, United States.

== Biography ==
=== 1980s: Sleep concerts and early career ===
When Rich was a freshman at Stanford University in the 1980s, he gave free sleep concerts from the lounge of his dormitory. After positive results, he began performing around the San Francisco Bay Area. These performances were experiments to influence REM cycle sleep with auditory stimulus. They were usually nine hours long and lasted from 10 p.m. to 7 a.m. During these performances, he would generate abstract drones and atmospheres while the audience dozed in sleeping bags that they brought themselves. In the morning, he ended the concert with piano solos and served tea.

During this time, he released four albums on cassette: Sunyata (1982), Trances (1983), Drones (1983), and his first live album titled Live (1984). He recorded the first album when he was 18 years old.

At Stanford, Rich earned his degree in psychology, studying sleep and consciousness with Stephen LaBerge, an expert in lucid dreaming. Rich cites dreams as inspirations for his compositional process.

Rich applied to study at Stanford’s Center for Computer Research in Music and Acoustics. He organized a meeting with John Chowning, the founder of the class and inventor of FM synthesis. When Chowning saw Rich’s first three albums, he was approved for the class.

In 1983, he and Rick Davies together with a bassist named Andrew McGowan, formed a group called "Urdu". They performed several live concerts in the San Francisco Bay area between 1983-1985. Some of the group's recorded material was released as a self-titled cassette in 1985.

In 1985, Rich recorded an album titled Numena, which was released two years later. He composed it upon request from a Swedish music label started by one of his fans. This album marked the beginning of a new sound for Rich; it was his first album to explore complex rhythmic patterns, a wider range of acoustic instrumentation, and just intonation.

Rich recorded Geometry between 1986-1987, which was released in 1991. Rich was inspired by the symmetry and unity in Islamic patterns. Rich refers to this abstract and symmetrical sound as "shimmer." Another contrasting style present in this album Rich calls "glurp," which represents organic, liquid, and subterranean sounds.

Rich's best-selling CD was Rainforest (1989), which sold 50,000 copies.

=== 1990s–2000s ===
In the years that followed, he developed a complex range of sounds founded upon the seamless integration of electronic, electric, and acoustic instrumentation, and the exploration of just intonation tuning.

His interest in using unique sounds inspired him to create a large collection of original field recordings and homemade instruments. One of these instruments is a range of flutes made from PVC pipe.

His interest in unique sounds has also given him work as a sound designer for synthesizer presets and for E-mu Systems’ Proteus 3 and Morpheus sound modules. He has also designed sounds for films including Pitch Black and Behind Enemy Lines, a series of sampling discs called Things that Go Bump in the Night, and a library of Acid Loops called Liquid Planet. He helped create the MIDI micro-tuning standard along with Carter Scholz, which divides the octave into 196,608 equal parts.

His collaborators over the years have included Steve Roach, Brian "Lustmord" Williams, Lisa Moskow, Alio Die, and Ian Boddy, among others.

In 1992, he formed a new group called Amoeba. The group released three albums featuring ex-Urdu members Rick Davies and Andrew McGowan at different times, including Eye Catching (1993), Watchful (1997), and Pivot (2000). Since Rich was the only member in common between the first and second album, though, he doesn't consider Eye Catching to represent the band. Amoeba features Rich on vocals, and is inspired by a tradition of introspective songwriting.

In 1995, Rich revived the sleep concerts for radio after a DJ from KUCI in Irvine CA suggested the idea to him. In 1996, he did a three month tour across the U.S. playing sleep concerts for studio and live audiences.

In 2001, he released an album titled Somnium, a 7-hour album divided into three tracks on one DVD video. This album was a recreation of the sleep-concert environment he had created during the 1980s at Stanford. Somnium represents a landmark in ambient music, being one of the longest continuous musical compositions ever released.

In 2004, he released an album of piano solos titled Open Window. This album documents his improvised piano style that has been part of his live concerts for decades. It was recorded on a 1925 vintage A.B. Chase baby grand piano.

On March 11, 2005, Rich suffered a hand injury while cleaning a glass jug, accidentally slipping and falling on top of it. During the recovery process, he continued to record new material and tour. He also constructed end-blown flutes from PVC pipe that are more easily played with his limited right-hand dexterity.

During his 2006 tour, Rich performed in front of a film created by visual artist Daniel Colvin as a backdrop. After the tour, he created a score for the film, which was released on CD and DVD in 2007 under the title Atlas Dei. In 2007, he also released the album Illumination, a companion soundtrack of a multimedia installation by Michael Somoroff, originally created for the Rothko chapel. He collaborated with touch guitarist Markus Reuter in the album Eleven Questions (2007).

== Discography ==
=== Solo studio and live albums ===
- 1982: Sunyata (reissued 2013 on Sunyata & Inner Landscapes)
- 1983: Trances (reissued 1994 on Trances/Drones)
- 1983: Drones (reissued 1994 on Trances/Drones)
- 1984: Live (live)
- 1987: Inner Landscapes (live) (reissued 2013 on Sunyata & Inner Landscapes)
- 1987: Numena (reissued 1997 on Numena + Geometry)
- 1989: Rainforest
- 1991: Gaudí
- 1991: Geometry (reissued 1997 on Numena + Geometry)
- 1994: Propagation
- 1994: Night Sky Replies (limited edition 3" CD)
- 1996: A Troubled Resting Place (collects lone tracks)
- 1998: Below Zero (collects lone tracks)
- 1998: Seven Veils
- 2000: Humidity (live, 3 discs)
- 2001: Somnium (audio in DVD-video format)
- 2001: Bestiary
- 2003: Temple of the Invisible
- 2003: Calling Down the Sky
- 2004: Open Window
- 2005: Echo of Small Things
- 2006: Electric Ladder
- 2007: Music from Atlas Dei
- 2007: Illumination
- 2009: Live Archive
- 2010: Ylang
- 2011: Medicine Box
- 2012: Nest
- 2013: Morphology
- 2014: Premonitions 1980-1985
- 2014: Perpetual (A Somnium Continuum) (Blu-ray)
- 2015: Filaments
- 2016: What We Left Behind
- 2016: Foothills: Robert Rich Live on KFJC, 28 May 2014
- 2016: Vestiges
- 2017: Live at the Gatherings 2015
- 2018: The Biode
- 2019: Tactile Ground
- 2020: Offering to the Morning Fog
- 2020: Neurogenesis
- 2023: Travelers' Cloth

=== Collaboration albums ===
- 1985: Urdu by Urdu
- 1990: Strata (with Steve Roach)
- 1992: Soma (with Steve Roach)
- 1993: Eye Catching by Amoeba
- 1995: Yearning (with Lisa Moskow)
- 1995: Stalker (with Brian "Lustmord" Williams)
- 1997: Watchful by Amoeba
- 1997: Fissures (with Stefano Musso/Alio Die)
- 2000: Pivot by Amoeba
- 2002: Outpost (with Ian Boddy)
- 2005: Lithosphere (with Ian Boddy)
- 2007: Eleven Questions (with Markus Reuter)
- 2008: React (with Ian Boddy)
- 2008: Zerkalo (with Faryus)
- 2014: A Scattering Time by Meridiem (with Percy Howard)
- 2017: Lift a Feather to the Flood (with Markus Reuter)
- 2022: For Sundays when it Rains (with Luca Formentini)
- 2024: Waves of Now (with Steve Roach)
- 2024: Cloud Ornament (with Luca Formentini)
- 2025: Incubation (with Markus Reuter)

== General references ==
- Interview (January 2005), Ambient Visions website.
- Liner notes, Sunyata (1982).
- Essay by Rick Davies from the liner notes, Trances/Drones (1983/1994).
