= Lustmord =

Welsh musician and composer

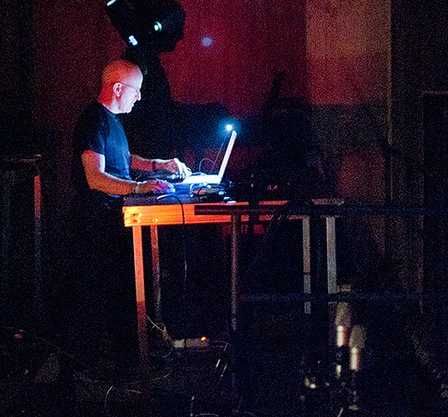
- Lustmord performing in 2011

Background information
- Also known as: Isolrubin BK; Arecibo; Dread
- Born: Brian Williams
- Origin: North Wales
- Genres: Dark ambient; industrial
- Occupation: Musician
- Instruments: Synthesizer; programming
- Years active: 1980–present
- Labels: Hydra Head; Soleilmoon
- Formerly of: TGT; Terror Against Terror
- Website: lustmord.com

Brian Williams is a Welsh musician, sound designer, and composer. He has published music under the name Lustmord since the 1980s as well as individual album releases as Isolrubin BK, Arecibo, and Dread.

Williams began as a recording artist within the industrial genre, working with Chris & Cosey and SPK. Adopting the moniker Lustmord, he continued to employ the industrial aesthetic while employing reverb and similar effects to evoke an atmosphere of cosmic horror. Starting with the 1989 album Heresy, Lustmord albums have been centered on manipulating sampled recordings with a computer. These samples included field recordings made in locations such as crypts, caves, and slaughterhouses. Williams downplays the sinister connotations of these locations and says they were picked for "acoustics".

The influence of Williams's work on subsequent artists has led critics to call him "a reluctant pioneer of the dark ambient genre who regards his music as neither dark nor ambient".

== Early life ==
Williams was raised in the Welsh town of Bethesda, Gwynedd, in a working-class family. He moved to London, living in a Lambeth squat. There, he befriended Throbbing Gristle members Cosey Fanni Tutti and Chris Carter, who urged him to make his own music.

== Career ==
Williams began releasing records as Lustmord with a self-titled debut (as "Lustmørd") in 1980. The name in German translates as "lust murder" and alludes to a painting tradition in Weimar-era Germany, in which artists like Otto Dix and George Grosz painted scenes of rape and mutilated female bodies that captured the amorality of the interwar period.

Lustmord's second album, Paradise Disowned, came out in 1986. Critics and Williams himself considered his third Lustmord album, 1990's Heresy, to be his breakthrough work. Williams has attributed Heresy's success to his use of an Atari computer as a digital audio workstation. In retrospectives of Lustmord's work and the dark ambient genre, critics have called Heresy a milestone. In 1995, he collaborated with the American ambient musician Robert Rich on the critically acclaimed album Stalker. His 2008 record [ O T H E R ] features guest appearances by Adam Jones (Tool), King Buzzo (Melvins), and Aaron Turner (Isis).

Black Star
Sample of "Black Star", from Strange Attractor (EP, 1996) also on the compilation album Purifying Fire (2000)

Lustmord has worked with the progressive metal band Tool since the early 2000s, notably on remixes of their 2001 singles "Schism" and "Parabola", which were published in December 2005. He also contributed to the band's 2006 album, 10,000 Days, with the atmospheric storm sounds on the title track. He later worked with Tool vocalist Maynard James Keenan, collaborating on his project Puscifer's 2007 debut album, "V" is for Vagina, as well as providing several remixes for "V" is for Viagra. The Remixes (2008). Lustmord eventually generated a collection of dub remixes of several tracks from "V" is for Vagina, known as "D" Is for Dubby – The Lustmord Dub Mixes, also released in 2008. He worked with Tool again in 2019, providing the ocean and wave sound effects on the track "Descending", from their album Fear Inoculum.

Lustmord has extracted field recordings made in crypts, caves, and slaughterhouses, and combined them with occasional ritualistic incantations and Tibetan horns. His treatments of acoustic phenomena encased in digitally expanded bass rumbles have a dark-ambient quality.

=== Video games ===
Around 1999, Interplay Entertainment hired Williams to create the musical score for the video game Planescape: Torment. He worked on the project for four months, writing over 40 original pieces. However, just six weeks before the game was released, one of the producers had a change of heart on the game's musical direction, and Williams's compositions went unused. His first time working on a video game project, Williams considered the experience "terrible", eventually reusing some of the elements from the score in his 2001 album, Metavoid. He has since provided music and sound design for a variety of other projects, including Far Cry Instincts (2005). In 2015, he composed the soundtrack for Evolve with Jason Graves, and in 2022, he wrote the score to the horror game Scorn, alongside Aethek.

=== Film and television ===
As Lustmord, Williams has collaborated extensively with composers Graeme Revell and Paul Haslinger on film soundtracks, most notably on The Crow (1994) and Underworld (2003). He wrote the score to the 2017 film First Reformed and the 2020 film The Empty Man.

The series Vikings and Vikings: Valhalla make use of music from his 2013 album The Word as Power.

== Personal life ==
In the early 1990s, Williams relocated to California from London. He is an atheist.

== Discography ==
=== As Lustmord ===
Year	Title	Label
1981	Lustmørd	Sterile Records SR 3
1986	Paradise Disowned	Soleilmoon
1990	Heresy	Soleilmoon
1991	A Document of Early Acoustic & Tactical Experimentation	
1992	The Monstrous Soul	Soleilmoon
1994	The Place Where the Black Stars Hang	Soleilmoon
1995	Stalker (with Robert Rich)	Fathom/Hearts of Space
1997	Lustmord vs. Metal Beast (with Shad Scott)	
2001	Metavoid	Nextera
2002	Law of the Battle of Conquest (EP, with Hecate)	
2002	Zoetrope	Nextera
2004	Carbon/Core	
2004	Pigs of the Roman Empire (with Melvins)	Ipecac
2007	Juggernaut (with King Buzzo)	
2008	[ O T H E R]	
2013	The Word as Power	
2016	Dark Matter	
2020	Trinity	
2020	The Fall (Dennis Johnson's November Deconstructed) (EP, with Nicolas Horvath)	Sub Rosa
2021	Alter (with Karin Park)	Pelagic Records
2024	Much Unseen Is Also Here	
2026	The Pulse of Atoms (with Dave Lombardo)	Ipecac
Remix albums
2008	"D" is for Dubby – The Lustmord Dub Mixes (by Puscifer)	
2009	[ THE DARK PLACES OF THE EARTH ]	
2009	[ T R A N S M U T E D ]	
2009	[ B E Y O N D ]	
2009	[ O T H E R D U B ]	
2010	Heretic	
2015	Vampillia Meets Lustmord (with Vampilia)	
Live albums
1982	Lustmordekay	Sterile Records cassette SRC 6
2006	Rising (06.06.06)	
2013	Kraków (October 22 2010)	
2014	Stockholm (January 15 2011)	
2017	Hobart (June 12 2011)	
2017	Maschinenfest (October 2 2011)	
2020	Lublin (December 10 2016)	
2020	Berlin (March 25 2018)	
2025	New York 2011	
Soundtracks
2017	First Reformed	
2020	The Empty Man	
2022	Scorn (with Aethek)	
Compilations
2000	Purifying Fire	Soleilmoon
2011	Songs of Gods and Demons	
2013	Things That Were	
2022	The Others	Pelagic Records
Appearances
1986	Vhutemas Arechetypi ("Mass", "Permafrost")	

=== with TGT ===
- White Stains (1990)

=== with Terror Against Terror ===
- Psychological Warfare Technology Systems (1992)

=== as Isolrubin BK ===
- Crash Injury Trauma (1993)

=== as Arecibo ===
- Trans Plutonian Transmissions (1994)

=== as Dread ===
- In Dub (2017)

== See also ==
- List of ambient music artists
