= Cyberchump =

American electronic music band

- Origin: Milwaukee, Wisconsin; Kansas City, Missouri; United States
- Genres: Electronica, ambient, experimental
- Years active: 2000–present
- Labels: Internal Combustion (2000–2022); Spiralight Records (2004); Om Records (2005); Chi-Qi (2014)
- Members: Mark G.E., Jim Skeel
- Website: www.cyberchump.com

Cyberchump (sometimes stylized as CyberCHUMP) is an electronica duo whose music is mainly ambient and often experimental and electro-organic, formed by Milwaukee multimedia artist, and Xposed 4Heads founder, leader, and lead vocalist, Mark G.E., the multimedia alias of psychologist Mark Eberhage, and Kansas City musician Jim Skeel, who was formerly in the bands The Buckthrusters and Short-term Memory, and featured on the compilation Fresh Sounds from Middle America (vol 2). The band members live in different cities and made a point of collaborating long distance via Internet, long before the COVID-19 pandemic in the United States prompted widespread Internet collaboration. The band's name derives from the duo's formative "fumbling learning process" with the tools and technical means of their collaboration.

== Critical reaction ==
Music critic and founder of the Art of Noise, Paul Morley lists Cyberchump's Dreams Groove as "One of 88 albums" that should be heard in his book Words and Music: A History of Pop in the Shape of a City.

In The Shepherd Express, reviewer Jason Kiel describes the duo's collaborative dynamic by noting that "Skeel's tendencies to jam are an intriguing counterpoint to Mark G.E.'s methodical experimentation."

In an OnMilwaukee article, reviewer Bobby Tanzillo called the music of the electronic, ambient, experimental rock duo "genre-defying and ever-evolving."

== Collaborations, works ==
Guest musicians have included John Kruth, Mike Kashou, who played bass on the first album Garbage, by the band Garbage, Jason Loveall from The Danglers, Jason Todd, and a telephone call cameo from Victor DeLorenzo of the Violent Femmes. Several of their album covers are the work of international surrealist artist J. Karl Bogartte of the Chicago Surrealist Group, whose work is in several museums, including the collection of the Milwaukee Art Museum.

Their music appears in the documentary Maybe A Baby by filmmaker Theresa Ala Mode, and Ross Bigley's film Zombie Frat House.

Mark G.E.'s short film homage to Edward Gorey, The Unfortunate Gift, was submitted to the Edward Gorey House Archive by Florence Parry Heide, and accepted. Many of his other videos have been screened at several Milwaukee Film Festivals, and others.

Cyberchump have published many full length releases, and songs on compilations released by Om Records, Spiralight, and Chi-Qi.

== Radio exposure ==
The duo is played on several national radio programs including Echoes, Music from the Hearts of Space, Musical Starstreams, and internationally on the programs Ultima Thule Ambient Music, and Pandora.

The duo are interviewed on the radio regularly with numerous specials lasting two or three hours, by Mary Bartlein on Milwaukee station WMSE, and Jim Lange's Eclectopia which airs on West Virginia Public Broadcasting radio.

== Members ==
- Mark G.E. – altered keyboards, five-string fretless bass, electric guitar, treated accordion, samples, machines (2000–present)
- Jim Skeel – high & low looped electric guitars, keyboards, bass, samples, manipulations (2000–present)

=== Guest members ===
- Victor DeLorenzo – answering machine voice (2000)
- Rebecca Brinkley – The Orbitan Voices (2000–2002)
- John Kruth – arghul, rhaita (2000–2002, 2004)
- Theresa Ala Mode – The Orbitan Voices (2000–2002, 2005)
- Julio Pabon – digeridoo (2000, 2004, 2006)
- Hafiza Capehart – flute (2000, 2006–2008)
- Jahmes Finlayson – percussion, berimbau (2000, 2008)
- David D. Gupta – Indian tablas (2002)
- Jayne Holland-Sedli – backing voice (2002)
- Gregg Jackson – percussion (2002)
- Mike Kashou – bass (2002)
- Paul Sadler – percussion (2002)
- Jason Todd – soprano saxophone (2002–2003, 2005, 2022)
- Jason Loveall – violin (2002, 2005, 2008)
- Tim Higgins – percussion (2002, 2008)
- Neal Rops – sample harvest (2005–2008, 2010)
- Jeanne Marie Vielleux – lead voice (2005–2008, 2013–2016)
- J. Karl Bogartte – uilleann pipes (2006, 2013)
- Kelp Chofs – keyboard (2016)
- Alex M.E. – viola, voice (2016)
- Toni Martin – voice (2019)
- Shannon Sloan-Spice – voice (2019)
- Jesse Montijo – alto saxophone, flute (2022)

== Discography ==
=== Studio albums ===
- Dreams Groove (2000)
- Inner Grooves (2002)
- Abstract Air (2003)
- Scientists in the Trees (2004)
- Secrets to Tell You (2005)
- Sankhara (2006)
- Our Wizards of Earth (2008)
- Their Moment of Perfect Happiness (2011)
- Flutter and Flow (2013)
- The Construction of Things (2016)
- After (2018)
- Zombie Frat House Original Soundtrack (2019)
- Long Night Moon (2020)
- Quirks of the Zen Dog (2022)
- Forming (2025)

=== Compilation albums, with various artists ===
- Ambienism Volume One (2004)
- Om: Discovery vol. 1 downtempo (2005)
- Ambient Grooves (2014)

=== Remix albums ===
Cyberchump + Janzyk – ReGrooved (2010)
