= Jeff Pearce (American musician) =

Indiana-based ambient/new age musician

Jeff Pearce is an Indiana-based ambient/new age musician. He has been called "one of the top two electronic guitarists of all time" by Allmusic, while reviewer John Diliberto wrote in Billboard magazine that Pearce is "one of the best" guitarists to follow the solo electric guitarist concept. Pearce started playing guitar at age 13 and discovered the music of Brian Eno and Harold Budd while in college.

== Recordings ==
Pearce's first CD, Tenderness and Fatality, was released in 1993 and the following six CDs saw Pearce focusing on creating music using only electric guitar. His CDs To the Shores of Heaven and Bleed were picked as "CD of the month" by the producers of NPR's Echoes radio program. For his eighth and ninth CD's, Lingering Light and Rainshadow Sky, Pearce featured compositions written for the Chapman Stick. Pearce plays the Alto Chapman Stick, and in 2009, was asked to write an article for Stick Enterprises (manufacturer of the Chapman Stick) about his experience with the Alto Stick.

== Awards and airplay ==
Pearce's 2008 CD, Rainshadow Sky was voted "album of the year" by the DJs and radio programmers who submit their playlists to the Zone Music Reporter reporting service. In 2000, his CD To the Shores of Heaven was voted "favorite CD of the year" by the listeners of the Echoes radio program, while his 2005 CD Lingering Light was voted the Echoes listeners' #10 favorite CD of the year. Pearce's 2014 album, "With Evening Above" was the #1 new age radio airplay album of 2014, and was also awarded "Ambient Album of 2014" at the Zone Music Reporter Awards Show, while his 2016 album "Follow the River Home" also received a ZMR "Ambient Album of 2016" award. In 2017, Jeff's album, "From the Darker Seasons", charted in the top 10 of Billboard Magazine's New Age chart. In 2019, Jeff's 14th album, "Skies and Stars", made its debut at #2 on Billboard Magazine's New Age chart.

Pearce's music can also be heard on the nationally syndicated weekly radio program Music from the Hearts of Space.

== Contributions and compilations ==
Pearce played on two cuts on William Ackerman's Grammy-nominated recording "Meditations" and has music on two of the Echoes "Living Room Concert" CDs. Pearce also contributed a Chapman Stick version of "Sudden Light" to the Star's End 30th anniversary CD, appearing alongside Robert Rich, Jonn Serrie, and Steve Roach. He has also contributed his guitar and Stick playing to recordings by Kevin Keller, Paul Avgerinos, Al Conti, Robert Linton, and Vidna Obmana.

== Discography ==
- 1993: Tenderness and Fatality
- 1995: The Hidden Rift
- 1997: Vestiges
- 1998: Daylight Slowly
- 2000: To the Shores of Heaven
- 2001: The Light Beyond
- 2002: Bleed
- 2003: Summer Solstice
- 2005: Lingering Light
- 2008: Rainshadow Sky
- 2012: In the Season of Fading Light
- 2014: With Evening Above
- 2014: Solitude: December (EP)
- 2015: Winter Calm (EP)
- 2016: Follow the River Home
- 2017: From the Darker Seasons
- 2019: Skies and Stars
- 2020: Archive 1: Songs for the Gathering
- 2020: Hidden Shores/Empty Beach
- 2022: In Late Summer
- 2022: Slowly Falling (Extended Mix)
