= 2MBS Fine Music Sydney =

FM radio station in Sydney, Australia

Coordinates: 33.822312°S 151.19879°E

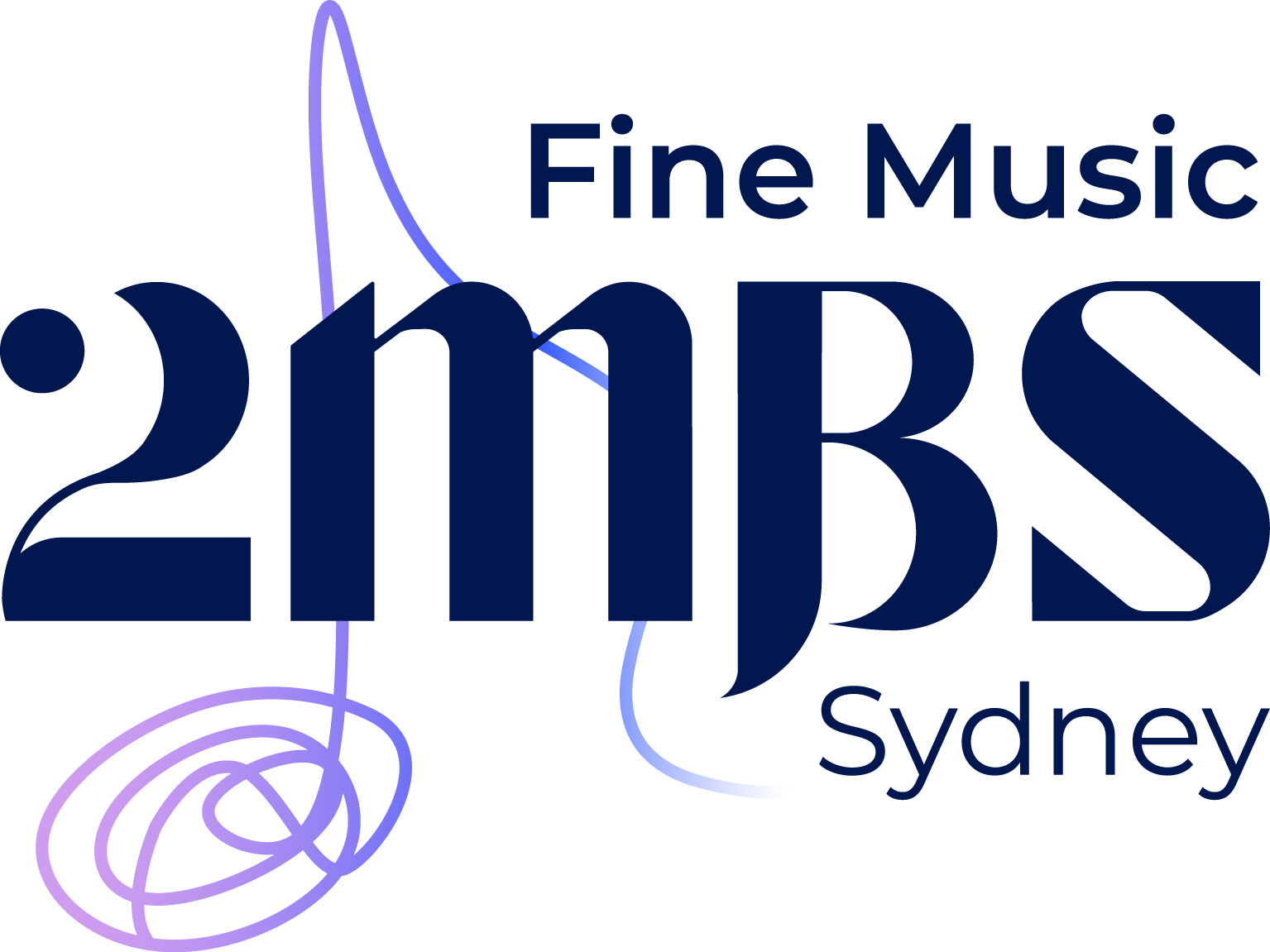
- St Leonards, New South Wales; Australia
- Broadcast area: Sydney
- Frequency: 102.5 MHz

Programming
- Format: Classical, jazz, Instrumental

Ownership
- Owner: Music Broadcasting Society of New South Wales Co-Operative Limited

History
- First air date: 15 December 1974
- Call sign meaning: Music Broadcasting Society

Technical information
- Licensing authority: ACMA
- Class: Community
- ERP: 50 kW

Links
- Public licence information: Profile
- Website: 2mbsfinemusicsydney.com

2MBS Fine Music Sydney (ACMA callsign: 2MBS) is a Sydney music radio station operated by the Music Broadcasting Society of New South Wales Co-Operative Limited. Launched on 15 December 1974, it is Australia's first fully licensed FM radio station and it has since reached over 630,000 listeners.

== Format ==
Approximately 50 percent of 2MBS Fine Music Sydney's on-air music content is from the western classical and related traditions which include baroque music, opera, contemporary classical music and chamber music. The remainder is made up of jazz, blues, operetta, world music, folk music, piano music, film soundtracks, documentary music, stage shows, oldies, sacred music, ethnic music, ambient music, and non-mainstream and experimental contemporary music.

== Background ==
The station broadcasts to the greater Sydney region from studios located at Chandos Street, St Leonards, at a frequency of 102.5 MHz, from a 50 kilowatt (ERP) transmitter located in the northern suburb of Artarmon. Its operations are conducted by volunteers and a small number of paid staff. Operational funding is principally derived from corporate sponsorship, arts partnerships, philanthropic donations, listener subscriptions, and the secondhand book and CD fairs held around the Sydney area.

In February 2020, the station rebranded from Fine Music 102.5 to Fine Music Sydney. and in 2022 added the prefix 2MBS to its name again to become 2MBS Fine Music Sydney.

== Programming ==
One of the station's most popular programmes for several decades was Evensong, a weekly programme of English sacred music in the Anglican tradition. Its regular presenter Mrs. Ann Ramsay died at the age of 91 on 1 April 2006. Evensong has been replaced by another popular Sunday program, Hosanna.

Popular non-classical programmes broadcast by the station include the blues show Stormy Monday, which has aired on Monday evenings for three decades, and for many years was rebroadcast nationally by the Community Broadcasting Association of Australia (CBAA) satellite service. Ultima Thule, the station's Sunday evening ambient music programme has been on air for nearly twenty years, and in 2005 became the first programme to be podcast on Australian community radio.

Fine Music Sydney is a member of the Australian Fine Music network which is a loose affiliation with a number of similar independently owned and operated stations in other parts of Australia, including 3MBS FM Melbourne, 4MBS FM Brisbane, 5MBS FM Adelaide, and ArtSound FM Canberra.

== Schedule ==
=== Jazz ===
Fine Music has over 15 programs per week that centre on jazz music (from its beginnings in the early 1900s right up to present) and it is Sydney's chief radio station that would primarily feature jazz music. Jazz music is aired every day on 12pm and 7pm (10pm on Sundays and as well as on Mondays). The schedule of Fine Music's jazz program is listed below:

- On Mondays, swing jazz from the 1920s and 1930s are featured at 12pm, and hard bop at 7pm.
- On Tuesdays, Dixieland (New Orleans Jazz) is broadcast and as well as smooth small group jazz from the 1950s to present.
- On Wednesdays at 12pm, the station plays contemporary jazz, usually having ethnic or Australian roots, with smooth jazz at 7pm.
- A fusion of Jazz pop and rock jazz is broadcast on Thursdays.
- Fridays feature jazz music specifically from Sydney and the program would feature guest interviews.
- Saturdays feature modern style, urban jazz that have a lounge music feel to them.
- At noon on Sundays, the station broadcasts ragtime and jazz from the first 30 years of the 20th century.

=== Other genres ===
- World music is featured on Saturdays from 10am to 11:30am and the regular Whirled Wide program, Sundays at 1:00pm.
- Oldies from the 1920s to 1950s are presented every 2nd and 4th Saturdays from 1pm to 2pm.
- Operetta and oratorio are broadcast on Saturdays from 2:30pm to 5pm.
- Stage, Film and Documentary music is aired regularly on Saturdays between 6 and 7pm and also from 5pm-6pm.
- Sacred music is broadcast on Sundays from 9am to 10am.
- Contemporary classical music is aired Sundays from 8:30pm to midnight.
- Opera music is aired on Wednesdays at 8pm.
- Ambient and easy listening music from across the world is featured on Thursdays from 10:30pm until midnight.

== See also ==
- 3MBS (Melbourne equivalent)
- ABC Jazz
