= 4MBS =

Radio station in Brisbane, Queensland, Australia

4MBS Classic FM
- Brisbane, Queensland; Australia
- Broadcast area: Brisbane RA1
- Frequencies: 103.7 MHz FM; 204.640 MHz (band 9B) Digital audio broadcasting
- Branding: 4MBS Classic FM

Programming
- Language: English
- Format: Classical music

Ownership
- Owner: Music Broadcasting Society of Queensland Ltd

History
- First air date: 1 March 1977
- Call sign meaning: 4 = Queensland; Music; Broadcasting; Society

Technical information
- ERP: 12,000 watts
- HAAT: 233 m
- Transmitter coordinates: 27°27′47″S 152°56′49″E

Links
- Website: 4mbs.com.au

4MBS Classic FM is an Australian community radio station which broadcasts classical music from Brisbane at a frequency of 103.7 MHz, as well as on digital radio and online.

== Operations ==
Its operations are conducted by about 300 volunteers and a small number of paid staff. Operational funding is principally derived from commercial sponsorship, listener subscriptions, a ticketing service, occasional sales of second-hand LPs, and an annual classical music festival.

4MBS Classic FM has a loose affiliation with a number of similar independently owned and operated stations in other parts of Australia, including 2MBS Sydney, 3MBS Melbourne, 5MBS Adelaide and ArtSound FM Canberra.

== History ==
The station first went to air on 1 March 1979 at 10.30am from a small area rented from the Queensland University of Technology's Kelvin Grove campus with Handel's Ode for St. Cecilia's Day. In 1994 it was moved to a large house in the suburb of Coorparoo. In later years, a 70-seat performance studio was built next to the house. The transmitter is located on Mount Coot-tha.

In the early 1990s it became home to Australia's only archive of original recordings by women composers, donated by the International League of Women Composers in New York.

== Key programs ==
4MBS broadcasts a weekly program titled Music Lover's Choice with announcer Howard Ainsworth, which previously aired since 1967 on the Australian Broadcasting Corporation.

In addition to its FM program of classical music, 4MBS broadcasts since May 2011 on the digital spectrum as MBS Light a selection of lighter classics, crossover music, musical theatre, jazz, and similar.

The Silver Memory Service broadcasts to custom designed receivers a program of music from the thirties and forties and music from screen and stage.

== 4MBS Festival of Classics ==
Since 1994, the station has staged the annual 4MBS Festival of Classics, which consists of concerts and other classical music related events that take place around Brisbane, featuring predominantly local artists. It is now Australia's largest classical music festival.

== Awards ==
In 2004, 4MBS Classic FM was named Radio Station of the Year by the Community Broadcasting Association of Australia.
