= Kevin Keller (composer) =

American composer and recording artist

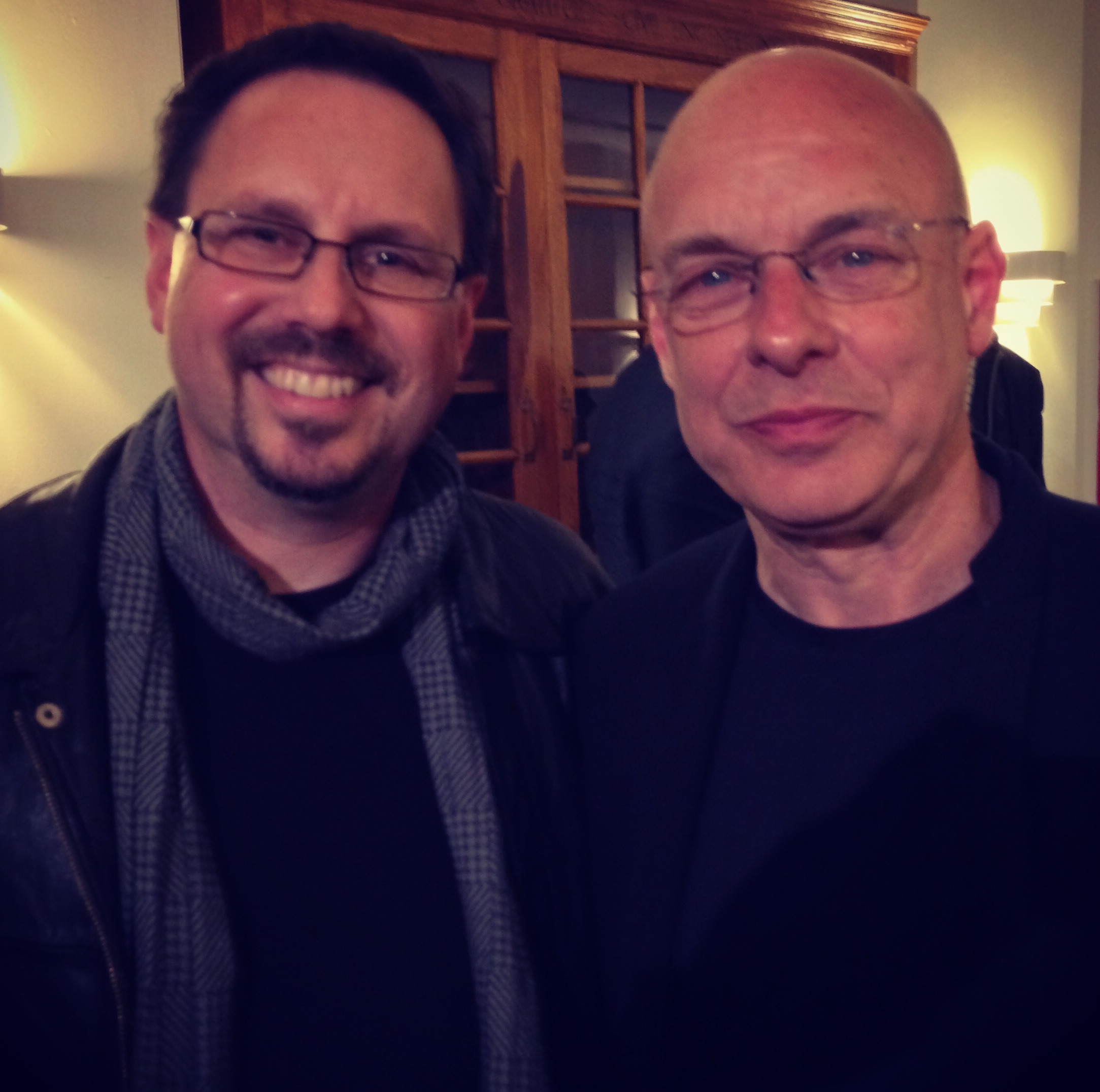
- Kevin Keller with Brian Eno, May 2013

Background information
- Born: San Diego, California, United States
- Genres: Contemporary classical, ambient, electronic
- Occupations: Composer, Producer
- Years active: 1986–present

Kevin Keller is an American composer and recording artist known primarily for "ambient chamber music", a style that combines live instruments with electronic effects.

== Biography ==
Starting out as a guitarist in his teen years, Keller turned to the piano while attending Jesuit High School, inspired by the music of Claude Debussy, Brian Eno, and Harold Budd. As a composition student, Keller composed ballet scores and chamber music, including a string quartet premiered by the Kronos Quartet at the 1986 Festival of New American Music. Keller later studied Film Scoring at Berklee College of Music under the tutelage of Pinar Toprak.

Keller's first solo recording "The Mask of Memory" (1994) came to the attention of radio producer Stephen Hill, who included several tracks on a Hearts of Space program titled "Digital Planet" in 1995. This was followed by a Living Room Concert and feature on Echoes, whose host John Diliberto named Keller's second CD "Intermezzo" as one of the Top 25 records of 1996. In total, Keller has released 16 full-length recordings and several EPs and compilations, working with musicians such as cellist David Darling, guitarist Jeff Pearce and Keller's own chamber ensemble of strings, woodwinds, percussion, and piano.

Keller currently resides in New York City, where he composes music for choreographers such as Dwight Rhoden, Elisa Monte, Amy Marshall, and Ray Sullivan. Keller's works are administered by BMI. His 2012 album "The Day I Met Myself" was produced by Russel Walder; the album won the ZMR Music Award for Best Neo-Classical Album of 2012. Keller and Walder teamed up again in 2015 for their follow-up album "La Strada", which also won the ZMR Music Award for Best Neo-Classical Album of 2015.

Keller's work "A Star in a Stoneboat" (from his album "Across the Sky") was featured on Season 13, Episode 9 of So You Think You Can Dance, in a piece choreographed by Tyce Diorio.

Keller's 2021 album "Shimmer" was named CD of the Month for October 2021 on the syndicated radio program Echoes.

== Albums ==
- The Mask of Memory (1994)
- Intermezzo (1996)
- Pendulum (1999)
- Across the Sky (2002)
- Gathering Leaves (2005)
- Santiago's Dream (2006)
- In Absentia (2009)
- The Day I Met Myself (2012)
- Nocturnes (2013)
- La Strada (2015)
- Ice Worlds (2019)
- The Front Porch of Heaven (2020)
- Shimmer (2021)
- Evensong (2023)
- Arcadia (2025)
- Altus (2026)

== See also ==
- List of ambient music artists
