= The Landscape Channel =

British TV channel

- Country: United Kingdom

Ownership
- Sister channels: Landscape HD

History
- Launched: November 1988
- Closed: 2019

Links
- Website: www.landscapetv.com (defunct)

The Landscape Channel was a British television channel set up by Nick Austin, co-founder of the Beggars Banquet record label, to showcase ambient videos set to classical and modern instrumental music.

== History ==
It began airing as an overnight programming block on Sky Channel in 1988 and ran until 1989. In November 1988, it started broadcasting on cable as a standalone channel, as a three-hour videotape service that was looped for a 24-hour cycle. It was financed through the mail-order sale of records featuring music heard in the service. In 1990, Landscape provided Channel 4 with 200 hours of morning programming as The Art of Landscape. This precipitated Landscape becoming a dedicated UK cable channel in 1991 on Windsor Television before expanding onto other UK cable networks, and also into Europe in 1993.

On 1 January 2001, Landscape moved to Internet connected server distribution allowing cable television providers to broadcast from local servers refreshed via the Internet, rather than via traditional, more expensive, satellite distribution. Due to a lack of funding, the channel's management was restructured between 2003 and 2007 although it continued to broadcast on the Dutch CAI Westland service.

The channel returned to Sky as a programming block on Friendly TV on 20 October 2003 and the Information TV range of channels in August 2010.

Both LandscapeTV.com and LandscapeHD.com defaulted to the former but both domains expired in mid-2014 and are now up for sale through Heart Internet.

== Landscape HD ==
Landscape HD logo

In 2005, The Landscape Channel began to offer high-definition programming on Landscape HD via their internet distribution service, which was upgraded in 2011 to offer 1080p video.
