= Ultima Thule Ambient Music =

Ambient music radio show

- Genre: Ambient music
- Running time: 90 minutes, weekly
- Country of origin: Australia
- Language: English
- Home station: 2MBS, Sydney
- Syndicates: Artsound, 5MBS and others throughout Australia via satellite
- Hosted by: George Cruickshank; Jack Anthony; Marc "Kundalini" Cottee; Jon Shapiro
- Created by: George Cruickshank
- Original release: 1 February 1989 – present
- Website: Official website
- Podcast

Ultima Thule Ambient Music is a long-running, specialist ambient music radio show which has been broadcast on Australian community radio since 1989. The show has been described as one of the leading alternative music programmes on Australian radio. It is also available as a webcast and as a podcast. As of December 2007, Ultima Thule was the number one ambient music podcast on the iTunes Store.

== Show format ==
Each broadcast is uninterrupted by back-announcing other than near the beginning and end of the show, and consists of a 90-minute musical soundscape created by segue mixing tracks from a number of different artists. The musical content of each show is eclectic and diverse, and can embrace ancient, mediaeval, contemporary classical, ethnic/world, cool jazz, film soundtracks and occasionally even popular idioms, in addition to mainstream ambient, new age and electronic music.

The duration of Ultima Thule has varied considerably over the years. Initially launched as a 90-minute programme, the duration was expanded progressively to two, and then three hours, until settling back into a 90-minute slot from March 2001.

== History and presenters ==
The project was conceived by George Cruickshank, and the first show aired on 1 February 1989, from the Narwee studios of 2NBC-FM. In early 1990 the show was moved to Australia's oldest and biggest community station, 2MBS-FM, where it has been based ever since.

From the show's foundation until late 1998, George Cruickshank was Ultima Thule's sole programmer and presenter. Towards the end of 1998, David Bassin, Candace Cappe, Victor Kay and Nev Dorrington joined Cruickshank as co-producers, although that arrangement proved impractical, and was terminated early in 1999.

Dorrington subsequently rejoined the show's on-air lineup late in 2001, along with Mike Watson, a.k.a. Mike G, creator of the Ambient Music Guide reference website. Watson remained with the show for five years, before departing in late 2006. Watson's position in the Ultima Thule roster was then taken by Marc "Kundalini" Cottee. Jon Shapiro joined the show in 2009. American presenter Jack Anthony replaced Nev Dorrington in 2016.

The show has been presented on a fortnightly cycle since late 2001, with Cruickshank presenting every second broadcast, while each of the other presenters take turns hosting the show in the alternate weeks.

== Syndication, streaming and podcast ==
Ultima Thule is broadcast live by 2MBS-FM in Sydney, Australia, on Thursday evenings between 10.30pm and midnight.

In June 2003 Ultima Thule was networked to Adelaide by 2MBS' sister station, 5MBS-FM. It is broadcast there on Sunday evenings, also from 10.30pm to midnight.

A third station in the Fine Music Network, Artsound FM, Canberra, began to carry the show in November 2006, broadcasting it on Tuesday evenings from 10.00pm.

In March 2008 it was announced on the Ultima Thule blog that the show had been picked up for nationwide distribution via the Community Broadcasting Association of Australia's Community Radio Network satellite service - which delivers shared programming to over 180 radio stations in all states and territories. That arrangement commenced on 2 May.

Ultima Thule has been available as a podcast since May 2005, and at any given time 8 shows are available for download in MP3 form through the programme's website. It can also be streamed live from the 2MBS-FM website.

== Compilation album ==
Chasing the Dawn: Ultima Thule Ambient Volume 01, a branded compilation album produced by George Cruickshank, was released as a fund-raiser for 2MBS in early 2006.

It features original and previously unreleased compositions by thirteen ambient artists, including Steve Roach, Tim Story, Robert Rich, and Numina.

The recording reached #41 on the New Age Reporter music chart in August 2006.

== See also ==
- Echoes, a nightly ambient music show produced by music critic John Diliberto
- Hearts of Space, an ambient music programme broadcast on NPR in the US since the late 1970s. Hosted by Stephen Hill
- Musical Starstreams, a US-based commercial radio program produced and hosted by Forest since 1981
- Star's End, a weekly ambient music programme broadcast on public radio in Philadelphia since 1976, hosted by Chuck van Zyl
- Music podcast
