= Jeff Pearce =

Jeff Pearce may refer to:

- Jeff Pearce (Canadian musician), bassist for the Canadian band Moist
- Jeff Pearce (American musician), ambient guitarist
- Jeff Pearce (historian)

== See also ==
- Jeff Pierce (disambiguation)
