= Kevin Keller =

Kevin Keller may refer to:

- Kevin Keller (composer), American recording artist and composer
- Kevin Lane Keller (born 1956), author and marketing professor
- Kevin Keller (character), the first openly gay character in the Archie Comics
