= Russel Walder =

American jazz oboist

- Born: February 9, 1959 (age 66); Deerfield, Illinois, U.S.
- Genres: World music, chamber jazz, ambient, contemporary classical
- Occupation(s): Musician, label owner
- Instrument(s): Oboe, duduk, keyboards,
- Years active: 1982–present
- Labels: Nomad Soul

Russel Walder (born February 9, 1959) is an American jazz oboist and the founder of Nomad Soul Records.

== Biography ==
Russel Walder was born and raised in Deerfield, Illinois. Following his graduation from Deerfield High School, he briefly attended the University of Arizona in Tucson, Arizona. Russel Walder is A Grammy Nominee and Multi Platinum Selling artist and widely regarded as one of the top contemporary composers and improvisers for the oboe in the world. Russel recently performed with the New Zealand Symphony Orchestra in 2020 as a soloist performing his own compositions which marked one of the few times in history that an oboe player improvised with an orchestra performing a personnel composition.

In 2020 Russel worked with Grinding Gears as a composer for music for Sony Xbox Games and is currently composing music for films & TV.

He attended The Boston Conservatory of Music and The California Institute of the Arts. He studied privately with teachers at The New England Conservatory of Music. At age 17, he toured Europe and North America with the United States Youth Symphony, appearing at Carnegie Hall and Royal Albert Hall, among many other notable venues.

He appeared on the contemporary jazz scene in 1982, at the age of 23, after joining Windham Hill Records and recording Elements with pianist Ira Stein. The pair met at Naropa Institute while studying with the jazz fusion group Oregon. He studied with Oregon's Paul McCandless.

After the success of Elements, Walder's next recording, 1986's Transit, again with Stein, included performances by Bruce Hornsby and mixing by Mark Isham. He signed to Narada, releasing Under the Eye, again with Stein. The recording also featured Marc Anderson, the percussionist from the Steve Tibbetts Group. The duo toured Europe and Spain numerous times with an expanded lineup of side musicians and also performed with Kurt Wortman. The pair headlined at the Spain Expo of 1992 in Seville.

Walder continued his solo career, signing with California label Real Music and recording his album Pure Joy, which went on to claim the number one spot on several U.S. radio charts. In 2006, after moving to New Zealand to appear as lead actor in the award-winning feature film The Lunatics' Ball, Walder launched his own music label, Nomad Soul Records. His first release, Rise, was launched in March 2007.

Walder released notable side projects and duets, trios, and quartets, with musicians such as Will Ackerman, Suzanne Ciani, Michael Gettel, Balafon Marimba Ensemble, Andrew White, New Zealand Symphony Orchestra, and many others.

He has contributed as a composer and performer to many compilations, including The Windham Hill Sampler 1986, Comfort Music, Meditation, Windham Hill: The First Ten years, Sanctuary, Dreamscape, Sonia Gaia Collection One, Freedom to Love, and A Winter's Solstice.

His work on A Winter's Solstice earned him a Grammy Award nomination for Best Instrumental Album in 1988, and went on to earn him two gold records and a platinum sales award.

Walder has been touring for more than 20 years and has composed over 60 pieces.

In 2005, Walder produced and composed Kura Huna with New Zealand singer Whirimako Black. Kura Huna was based on stories from the Tuhoe Tribe that were hundreds of years old. These laments were highly poetic and mournful. In 2011, he produced another album for Whirimako for Ode Records, called The Late Night Plays, her first all-English album of classic jazz and blues-related material. He produced The Day I Met Myself by the Kevin Keller Ensemble.

== Nomad Soul Records ==
Russel Walder in Prayers for the Millennium

Russel Walder launched Nomad Soul Records in 2006 from his state-of-the-art recording studios in Auckland, New Zealand. He has scored several soundtracks for the Discovery Channel. Rise was the first CD from Nomad Soul Records and featured Walder arranging, producing, recording, mixing, composing, and performing all of the instruments on the CD, including the middle-eastern-sounding Duduk. He played keyboards, percussion, and piano on Rise, as well as extending his use of mixing and sampling technologies.

Walder is chief executive officer and founder of Connect Giant, a video connection platform that allows a global audience to connect and for things people want need and love through video and chat.

== Discography ==
- Pure Joy (2002)
- The Breathing of the World (2005)
- Rise (2006)
- Bruce Lipton's Music for a Shift in Consciousness (2011)
- Speak To The Storm (2021)

Duets

- Guitarra Cheltica with Andrew White (1999)

Trios

- Past Light with William Ackerman & Ira Stein (1983)

Symphonic projects and soundtracks

- Ice Bow New Zealand Symphony Orchestra (1999) (from the film The Lunatics' Ball)
- Reluctant Revolutionary (2005)
- Standing on the Shoulders of the Many (2006)
- Kakadu National Park (Discovery Channel, 2007)
- Fiordland National Park (Discovery Channel, 2007)

Collaborations

- Elements (1982) with Ira Stein
- Transit (1986) with Ira Stein
- History of My Heart (1989) with Suzanne Ciani
- Under The Eye (1990) with Ira Stein
- Places in Time (1992) with Michael Gettel
- Harare to Kisangani (1993) with Balafon
- Guitarra Celtica (1999) with Andrew White
- Joan of Arc (1999) with Radha Sahar

With female vocalists

- One Caitlin Smith (2002)

Compilation appearances

- Windham Hill Sampler (1986)
- Windham Hill: First Ten years (1990)
- Sonia Gaia Collection One (1990)
- Narada Collection 3 (1990)
- Winters Solstice II (1990)
- Sanctuary (1996)
- Meditation (2001)
- Dreamscape (2000)
- Freedom to Love (2002)
- Comfort Music 1 (2004)
