= WNTI =

WNTI may refer to:

- WGGI (AM), a radio station (990 AM) licensed to serve Somerset, Pennsylvania, United States, which held the call sign WNTI from 2017 to 2023
- WXPJ, a radio station (91.9 FM) licensed to serve Hackettstown, New Jersey, United States, which held the call sign WNTI from 1957 to 2016
