= Moodtapes =

Background information
- Years active: 1986– present
- Labels: Moodtapes (A Ron Roy Production)
- Members: Ron Roy
- Past members: Ray Colcord, Frank Josephs, Jim Lum
- Website: moodtapes.com

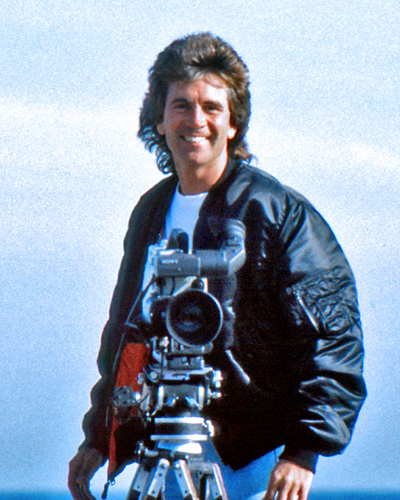
Ron Roy shooting "Pacific Surf"

Moodtapes are a series of nature/relaxation videos and audio collectibles (DVD, LD, CD) produced, directed, and filmed by award winning producer and director Ron Roy. They were some of the first of the New Age nature documentary/music genre in the 1980s and 1990s along with Windham Hill and Narada Productions.

They include Roy's original cinematography of natural scenery edited in perfect harmony to soothing original instrumental music by Ron Roy and various other professional composers.

Sixteen videos including Serenity, Ocean Reflections, Whispering Waters, Nature's Bouquet, Autumn Whispers...Winter Dreams, Pacific Surf, Contemporary Christmas etc, eight audio CD's, 6 Singles and numerous specialty music videos were released by Moodtapes and Ron Roy from 1986 to 2019.

== Credits ==
Ron Roy served as the producer, director and cinematographer on all the video productions and the producer/composer of original music on Pacific Surf, Whispering Waters, Contemporary Christmas, Sizzlin' Christmas and others.

He also designed all the productions album covers and artwork utilizing the original photos he took while on location for each project.

While filming one production, Ocean Reflections, Roy joined the San Diego State University Marine Mammal Research and Conservation team capturing bottlenose dolphin images with R. H. Defran, the director of the Cetacean Behavior Laboratory for his Moodtape Ocean Reflections.

Moodtapes musical presentations have been played in heavy rotation on Musical Starstreams, Los Angeles smooth jazz station KTWV - The Wave and numerous radio networks coast to coast. They charted Top Twenty on the national Adult Contemporary Music charts and Moodtapes iTunes podcast Relax with Moodtapes achieved top ten status in their Fitness & Nutrition category.

Moodtapes only solo CD release Energy was produced by Ray Colcord, an ASCAP, BMI, and Drama-Logue Award winner. Colcord also produced Aerosmith's second album Get Your Wings as well as numerous TV themes such as The Simpsons, Big Brother, The Facts of Life, Silver Spoons, and Boy Meets World.

Most recently, Ron Roy has become involved in Americana music as a composer, producer and singer/songwriter. His recent releases Now It's All Just Stuff, Bible Belted, You Could Hear The Sound of Panties Drop and You'll Never Ever Be Alone At Christmas have received worldwide airplay on numerous terrestrial and streaming stations including Renegade Radio Nashville, Trucker Radio Nashville, The BandWagon Network Radio, Jango Radio, ReverbNation and more.

Roy’s Yuletide song "You’ll Never Ever Be Alone At Christmas" charted #1 on RadioAirplay’s popularity charts and was named one of the Best New Holiday Songs four years in a row in their international Independent Songwriters Holiday Contest. It was also featured as the “Premiere Christmas Song” on Nashville’s Worldwide Trucker Radio Network whose Radio icon DJ Stan Campbell proclaimed: “The song is so relatable... I recommend it for ever radio station for Christmas!”

Roy’s Americana songs also landed him at #1 in his hometown on ReverbNation’s Americana Regional Charts and are also featured continuously on iTunes, Spotify, and more.

== Album releases ==
Pacific Surf DVD Album Cover

#	Release date	Album	Genre	Duration	Reviews	Ron Roy as	Other credits
1	1986	Tranquility (Video & CD)	Easy Listening,	33:23	AllMusic:	Producer, Director, Cinematographer	Ray Colcord (producer); Eric Bikales (artist)
2	1988	Energy CD	New Age	47:43	FMQB: positive	Producer, Director, Cinematographer	Ray Colcord (producer); Eric Bikales (artist)
3	1987	Floral Fantasy Video	Easy LIstening	49:37	Billboard: positive	Producer, Director, Cinematographer	Carmen Dragon, Eric Bikales (artists)
4	1989	Autumn Whispers… Winter Dreams (Video & CD)	Easy Listening	53:30		Producer, Director, Cinematographer	Eric Bikales (artist)
5	1991	Contemporary Christmas (Video & CD)	Easy Listening, Christmas Music	44:52		Producer, Director, Cinematographer	Frank Josephs (composer, arranger)
6	1993	Sleigh Ride (CD Single)	Upbeat Christmas music	2:54		Artist, Composer	Frank Josephs (arranger)
7	1993	It's Christmas Time (CD Single)	Upbeat Christmas Song	3:17		Artist, Composer	Frank Josephs (arranger)
8	1991	Ocean Reflections (Video & CD)	Easy listening	43:03		Producer, Director, Cinematographer	Ray Colcord (producer); Eric Bikales (artist)
9	1992	Natural Environments - Whispering Waters (Video & CD)	Easy listening	44:00		Producer, Director, Cinematographer	Frank Josephs (artist, arranger, composer)
10	1995	Pacific Surf (Video & CD)	Easy listening	47:20		Producer, Director, Cinematographer	Frank Josephs (arranger); Frank Josephs (composer)
11	1996	Romantic Classics by Firelight (Video & CD)	Classical music	44:24		Producer, Director, Cinematographer	Frank Josephs (arranger)
12	1997	Moments - Serenity (Video)	Easy Listening	56:00		Producer, Director, Cinematographer	Frank Josephs (artist), Jim Lum (guitarist), Eric Bikales (artist)
13	1998	Nature’s Bouquet (Video)	Easy Listening	54:46		Producer, Director, Cinematographer	Frank Josephs (artist, arranger)
14	2009	Romantic Classics by a Gentle Mountain Stream (CD)	Classical music	48:37		Producer, Co-arranger	Pachelbel, Tchaikovsky, Debussy (composers); Frank Josephs (arranger)
15	2009	Romantic Classics on Piano (CD)	Classical music	48:54		Producer, Co-arranger	Pachelbel, Tchaikovsky, Debussy (composers); Frank Josephs (arranger)
16	2009	Romantic Classics by the Sea (CD)	Classical music	50:51		Producer, Co-arranger	Pachelbel, Tchaikovsky, Debussy (composers); Frank Josephs (arranger)
17	2009	Act Naturally	Country	2:07	Reverb Chart	Singer	Frank Josephs, JIm Lum (guitar)
18	2011	Christmas (CD Single)	Christmas Music, Rock	3:35		Producer, Arranger	Frank Josephs (arranger); Jim Lum (guitarist)
		Jingle Bells Chicken (Video)	Children's Christmas Song	2:02		Producer, Singer	Frank Josephs (arranger)
19	2012	Pacific Blue (Video)	Music Video	4:12	Reverb Chart	Composer/Director	Jim Lum Guitar
20	2014	Impressions of Winter (Video)	Music Video	4:53	Reverb Chart	Producer/Director	Jim Lum Guitar
21	2015	You’ll Never Ever Be Alone At Christmas (Single)	Upbeat Americana Christmas Song	3:59	Reverb Chart	Singer/Songwriter	Frank Josephs (arranger)
22	2015	Now It’s All Just Stuff (Single)	Americana	3:48	Reverb Chart	Singer/Songwriter	Frank Josephs (arranger)
23	2015	Bible Belted (Single)	Americana	3:25	Reverb Chart	Singer/Songwriter	Frank Josephs (arranger)
24	2015	You Could Hear the Sound of Panties Drop (Single)	Americana	2:54	Reverb Chart	Composer/Lyrics	Kris Feldman Vocals
25	2018	Amazing Grace Trilogy (Music Video & Single)	Gospel	2:21	Reverb Chart	Singer/Arranger	Frank Josephs (arranger)

== Media coverage ==
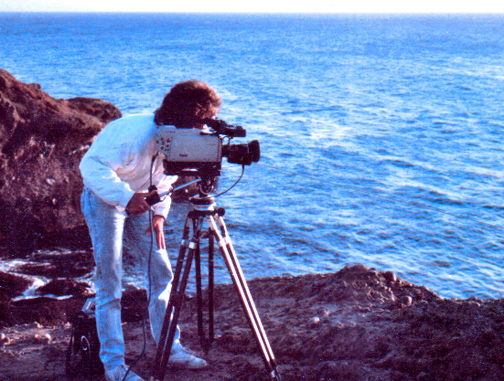
Ron Roy shooting "Ocean Reflections"

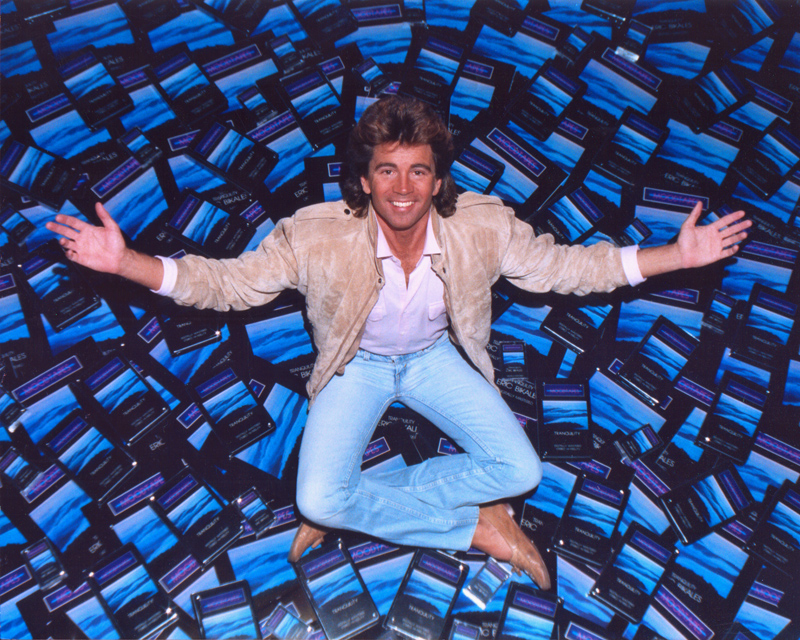
Ron Roy surrounded by Moodtapes

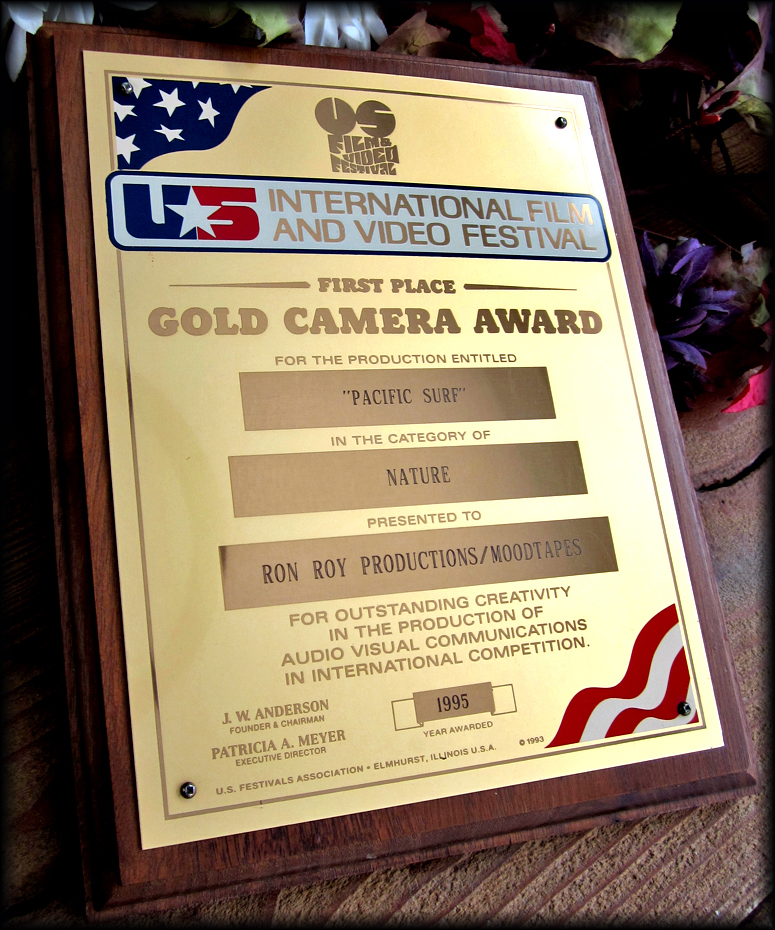
US INTL "Gold Camera" Award for "Pacific Surf"

The Moodtapes videos and music received national critical acclaim in Billboard, the Los Angeles Times , The New York Times and numerous others. They have been featured on leading national entertainment television shows such as Entertainment Tonight, The 700 Club, Live with Regis, The Oprah Winfrey Show as well as various other regional talk shows.

=== Therapeutic reviews ===
Various authors have recommended Moodtapes in their publications to use for relaxation and to treat insomnia.

== Commercial success ==
Moodtapes reached their greatest commercial success during the 1980s, 1990s, and early 2000s by becoming bestsellers in thousands of specialty stores in the United States, most notably The Nature Company outlets, Natural Wonders specialty stores, and also reaching an audience of millions via the Reader's Digest Video Catalogs . Bloomingdale's department stores also featured Moodtapes as A Best Bet Gift Idea in 1988.
