= 5MBS =

Community radio station in Adelaide, South Australia

Australia
- Broadcast area: Adelaide
- Frequency: 99.9 MHz

Programming
- Format: Classical/Jazz

Ownership
- Owner: Music Broadcasting Society of South Australia Inc
- Sister stations: 2MBS, 3MBS, 4MBS

Technical information
- Transmitter coordinates: 34.9367°S 138.6031°E

Links
- Website: www.5mbs.com

5MBS is a community radio station based in Adelaide, Australia and located in Hindmarsh, South Australia. It broadcasts on 99.9 MHz across much of the Adelaide metropolitan area, as well as a live stream via its website. 5MBS is run by volunteers, with no paid staff and is funded by contributions made by its listeners.

Similar to its sister stations 4MBS in Brisbane, 2MBS in Sydney and 3MBS in Melbourne, 5MBS broadcasts a mixture of classical music and jazz, as well as supporting Adelaide's local arts community.
