= Transit (Ira Stein and Russel Walder album) =

Studio album by Ira Stein & Russel Walder
- Released: 1986
- Genre: Electronic, Jazz, New age
- Length: 52:02
- Label: Windham Hill
- Producer: Dawn Atkinson, William Ackerman, & Mark Isham (co-producer)

Ira Stein & Russel Walder chronology
Elements (1982)	Transit (1986)	Under the Eye (1990)

Transit was the second collaborative album between keyboardist Ira Stein and oboist Russel Walder, released in 1986 by Windham Hill.

== Track listing ==
Transit
No.	Title	Length
1.	"The Underground"	6:32
2.	"Engravings"	4:04
3.	"Marseille"	5:37
4.	"Foreign Correspondence"	5:50
5.	"Transit"	4:26
6.	"Lost Time"	7:11
7.	"Circe"	5:09
8.	"The Calling"	4:52
9.	"Suite for Dominique: Over and Under/Round Robin/All Bounced Up"	8:21

== Reception ==
Keyboard described the album as "generally wishful, sometimes impassioned but never anguished" but wanted the album to have "more adventure in the chord progressions." Meanwhile, Billboard praised the album, even comparing “The Underground” to Tangerine Dream.
