= Brainvoyager =

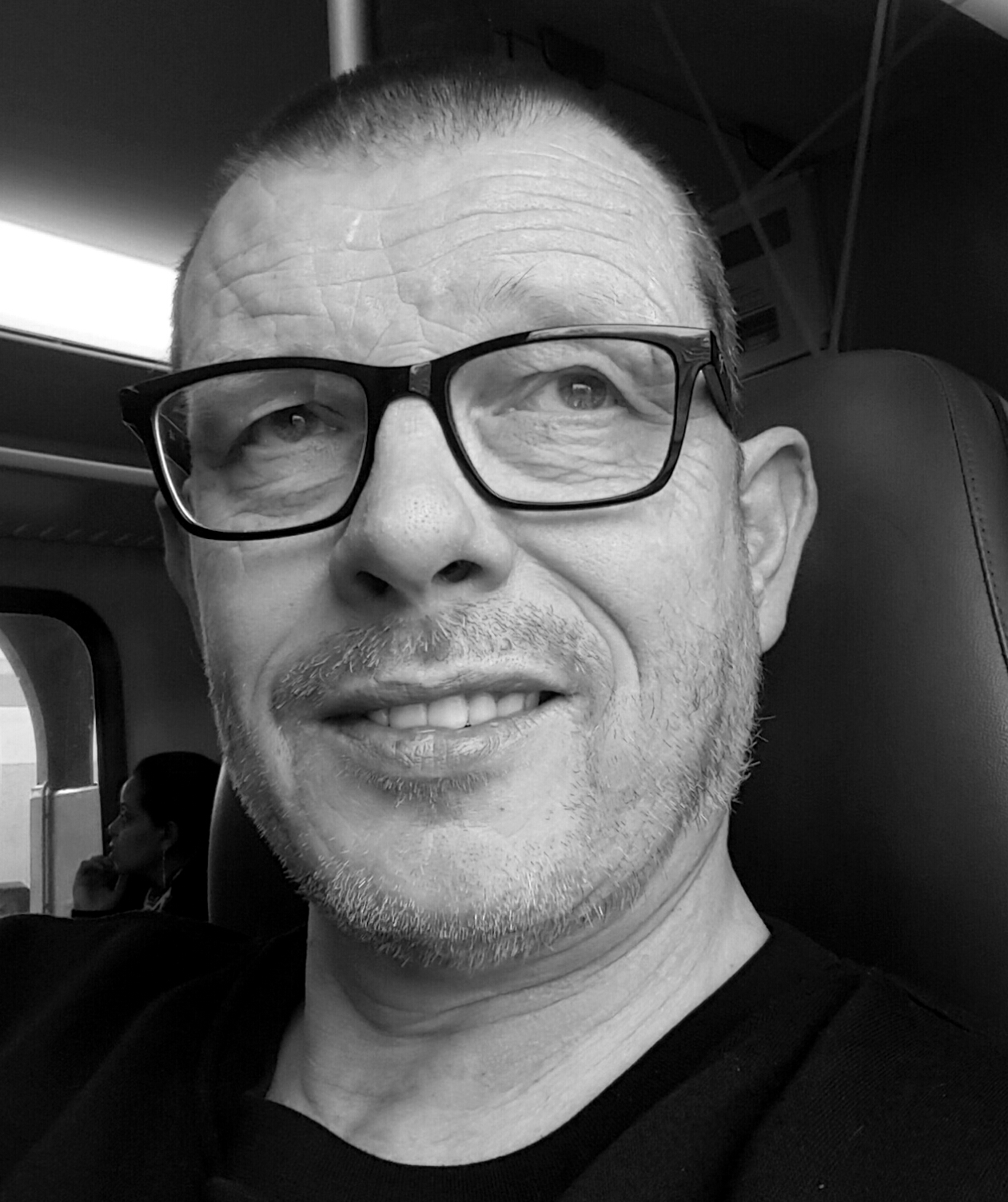
- Brainvoyager (Jos Verboven) in April 2016

Background information
- Born: 17 July 1962 (age 63)
- Origin: Berlicum, The Netherlands
- Genres: Electronic music Ambient; Space music Berlin School
- Occupations: Musician, producer
- Instruments: Keyboards, synthesizer, sequencer, drums, percussion
- Years active: 2012–present
- Website: brainvoyagermusic.com

Jos Verboven (born 17 July 1962), known by his stage name Brainvoyager, is a Dutch electronic music composer and musician. As "Brainvoyager" he also hosts a weekly radio show Electronic Fusion on four different radio stations.

Brainvoyager released three albums: Dreamworld in 2012, Compilation in 2013 and Drifting Memories in 2014. In 2017 Brainvoyager produced the opening track and closing track for the compilation albums Voyage through the Brain and History of the Universe, both released by the record label Legacy Of Thought.

In January 2017 the dance film A Touch of Oblivion was released. A Touch of Oblivion was released as a single music track in 2014. A choreography for this track made by two Dutch choreographers, was performed and filmed in the small Dutch theatre Het Raam in Hillegom.

== Brainvoyager as a musician ==
=== 1978–2012 ===
In 1978 Brainvoyager bought his first electronic music album Timewind of Klaus Schulze. It was the start of a long period of being a listener to electronic music and a visitor of many concerts of electronic musicians like Klaus Schulze, Tangerine Dream, Jean Michel Jarre, Bernd Kistenmacher, Ron Boots, Steve Roach and Vidna Obmana.

=== 2012–present ===
In 2012 Brainvoyager became a musician himself. As an experienced listener for three and a half decades he learned the ropes. The name "Brainvoyager" represents the intention of his music: to enable the listener to make a 'voyage' within his or her own brain. The music of Brainvoyager is best described as a mixture of contemporary rhythms and hypnotic electronic ambiences, inspired by the model of retro Berlin School of electronic music.

== Brainvoyager as a radio host ==
=== West Star Radio Ltd. from the UK ===
In September 2015 Brainvoyager became crew member of the British radio station and music agency West Star Radio Ltd. For this radio station he hosted the weekly radio show Electronic Fusion until spring 2020. Due to internal circumstances he left this radio station in May 2020. Electronic Fusion is dedicated to electronic music of various styles. The first episode aired on 18 September 2015 and there has been a new episode every week since, broadcast by a number of different radio stations.

=== Electronic Music Radio from Chile and Venezuela ===
Since April 2016 Electronic Fusion is also broadcast by the Chilean/Venezuelan radio station Electronic Music Radio.

=== Modul303 from Germany ===
Since the end of October 2016 Electronic Fusion is also broadcast by the German radio station Modul303.

=== SCIFI.Radio from the USA ===
Since 6 October 2019 Electronic Fusion is also broadcast by the US radio station SCIFI.Radio, formerly known as Krypton Radio.

=== Radio Dark Tunnel from Germany ===
Since March 2020 Electronic Fusion is also broadcast by the German radio station Radio Dark Tunnel.

== Discography ==
=== Solo albums ===
Year	Title
2012	Dreamworld
2013	Compilation
2014	Drifting Memories

=== Compilation albums ===
Year	Album title	Track title
2017	Voyage through the Brain	Nucleus Accumbens
2017	History of The Universe	The Sun Forms

=== Single tracks ===
Year	Title
2014	The Eternal Quest
2014	Floating Through Colorful Realms
2015	A Touch of Oblivion

=== Collaborations ===
Year	Track title	Collaborator
2014	Ébredés	David Maeso
