= Ron Roy (producer) =

American actor and producer

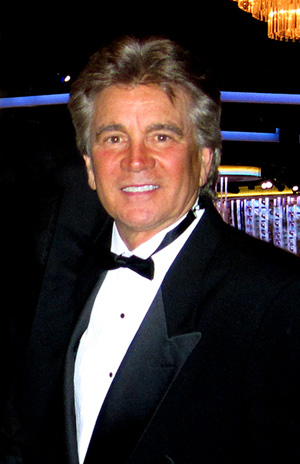
- Roy at Golden Globes Awards
- Born: May 28, 1951 (age 75); Shreveport, Louisiana
- Education: University of Texas, Sam Houston State University, University of Houston
- Occupations: Actor, producer, director, writer, composer, singer-songwriter, cinematographer
- Years active: 1973–present
- Organization(s): Ron Roy Productions, Moodtapes
- Known for: Moodtapes Nature Relaxation DVDs & CDs; Stand Up Comics Take A Stand – TV Comedy Specials (Director/Producer)
- Website: www.moodtapes.com,

Signature
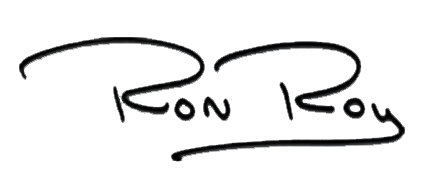

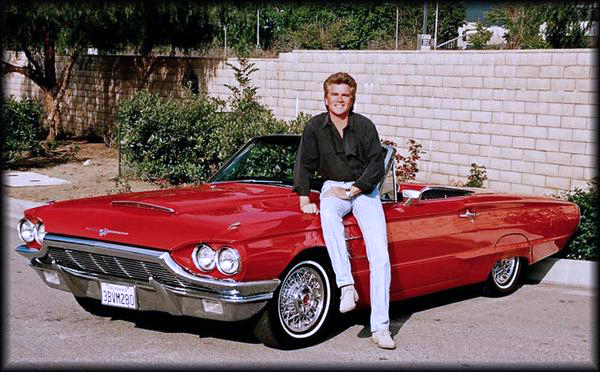
Ron Roy with one of his classic cars, 1965 Ford Thunderbird

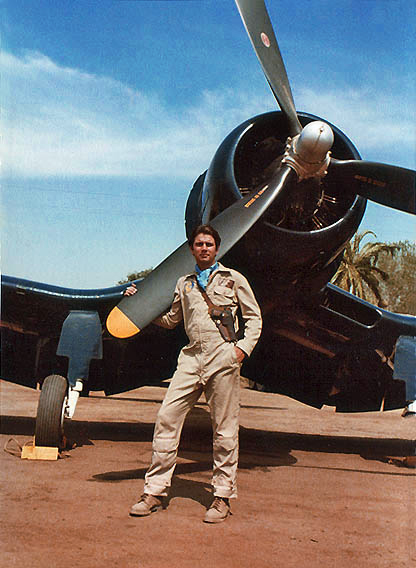
Ron Roy as Ensign Barrett in Black Sheep Squadron in 1978

Ron Roy is an American actor, producer, director, writer, composer, singer-songwriter and cinematographer. He is best known as the creator of the Moodtapes DVD / CD Nature/Relaxation Series and the producer/director of the annual two-hour television comedy special Stand Up Comics Take A Stand , which aired for four years nationally on The Family Channel.

He has produced, directed and/or starred in films, television, theater, documentaries, radio, commercials music videos, podcasts and iPhone apps.

== Early life ==
Ron Roy was born in Shreveport, Louisiana. He graduated from Spring Branch High School in Houston, Texas in 1969. He attended the University of Texas, Sam Houston State University, and the University of Houston as a theater arts major. In 1973 he moved to Los Angeles to pursue his career in the entertainment industry.

== Career ==
Ron Roy began his acting career in high school appearing in commercials for Joske's of Houston and then in college at the University of Texas in Arthur Millers After the Fall.

His first Hollywood role was playing a Texas State Trooper in Steven Spielberg's feature film Sugarland Express (Universal Pictures). In 1976 he played & narrated the leading role of Blair for the film Off the Edge which was nominated for an Academy Award for best documentary feature. In 1977 he played the recurring role of Billy White Cloud in ABC TV’s The Feather and Father Gang crime drama with series stars Stefanie Powers, Harold Gould, and The Man from U.N.C.L.E. – Robert Vaughn.

He also appeared on numerous network television series, TV movies and films, such as: Dallas, Police Story Love Is Stronger, Baa Baa Black Sheep, Capitol, Divorce Court, A New Day in Eden, The CBS Special – One Last Ride, Institute for Revenge, Hard Times, The Private Life, the cult horror film 'Til Death, and many more. Roy also appeared in numerous national and regional commercials, including: Chevrolet Vega, Triumph Spitfire, Gillette, Johnson & Johnson, Zenith and numerous others.

Ron Roy was one of the principal creators of Fashion Rock Videos which were designed to promote Designer clothing combined with Rock Music in the 1980's and 90's. Roy's was chosen by DuPont to create a series of videos for Boy George's avant-garde Lycra fashion line BodyMap for which he won first place in the NY/INTL Fashion Video Awards in 1985.

In 1988, Ron Roy became the producer and director of the two-hour comedy television special Stand Up Comics Take a Stand which aired on the CBN Family Channel for four seasons. This annual national comedy competition was created to discover "Hollywood's Hottest New Comic" and featured: Kelsey Grammer, Steve Allen, Mickey Rooney, John Ritter, Morgan Fairchild, Dawn Wells, Tim Matheson, Catherine Bach, Carroll O'Connor, Phil Hartman and many others as celebrity hosts each season. It was also the national fundraiser for United Cerebral Palsy with Roy also performing as the Celebrity Guest Host for the premiere presentation in 1988.

Theatrically, Roy is best known for originating the stage role of Lieutenant Young in the world premiere of Ray Bradbury's The Martian Chronicles at the Colony Theater in Los Angeles.

Ron Roy is credited with writing numerous documentaries such as The Hollywood Cross, which won a Hollywood Angel Award, TV scripts for Stand Up Comics Take A Stand (1991), and the majority of his Moodtapes and Ron Roy Productions projects.

His Moodtapes YouTube channel has a variety of music videos and documentaries he has produced, directed and filmed.

== Personal projects ==
Roy produced and marketed the top selling nature/relaxation audio and video collectible series Moodtapes, which included his own instrumental music edited to his original soothing footage of nature. He released nine videos and eight audio CDs: Tranquility, Autumn Whispers...Winter Dreams, Energy, Ocean Reflections, Contemporary Christmas, Whispering Waters, etc. He was the producer, director and cinematographer on all nine videos and his footage has been included in other films such as Nicole Conn's Cynara: Poetry in Motion and Michael Bay's Bad Boys II.

While filming one production Ocean Reflections, Roy joined the San Diego State University Marine Mammal Research and Conservation team capturing bottlenose dolphin images with R.H. Defran, the director of the Cetacean Behavior Laboratory.

Roy also created the meditation/relaxation podcast Relax With Moodtapes which he wrote, produced and narrated.

Most recently, Roy has become involved in Americana Music as a composer, producer and singer-songwriter.

Roy's Yuletide song "You’ll Never Ever Be Alone At Christmas" charted as a Number 1 Record on RadioAirplay's music charts. It was also featured as the Premiere Christmas Song on Nashville's International Trucker Radio Network .

He is involved with Altergy Systems, a zero emissions hydrogen fuel cell developer/manufacturer in Folsom, CA. Roy produces Altergy's documentary videos and serves as media/PR director and YouTube channel creator.

Roy is also an inventor who has received numerous US Patents for his various inventions primarily for industrial/consumer packaging.

Although Roy is currently semi-retired from a life in the entertainment industry, he is still very active in professional photography and cinematograpy.

== Filmography ==
=== Actor ===
| 1969 | Joske's (TV Commercial) | Student | Joske's |
| 1969 | Houston Chronicle | Himself | Fashion Article |
| 1972 | Fiddler on the Roof (Stage) | Russian Soldier | Windmill Dinner Theater |
| 1972 | After The Fall (Stage) | Dan | University of Texas |
| 1972 | Alice in Wonderland | King of Hearts | Fondren Street Theater |
| 1973 | Constantinople Smith | Constantinople Smith | Burbank Players Theatre |
| 1973 | If Men Played Cards... | Johnathon | Burbank Players Theatre |
| 1974 | Love Is Stronger | Jean-Louis | AFI |
| 1975 | Hard Times | Street Punk | Columbia Pictures |
| 1975 | Wrigley's Spearmint Gum (National TV Commercial) | Young Husband | Wrigley |
| 1976 | Off the Edge | Blair | Pentacle Films |
| 1976 | Maureen | Harvey (son) | CBS Comedy |
| 1976 | The Cheerleaders | Joe King | NBC TV Movie |
| 1976 | Chevy Vega (National TV Commercial) | Lead | Chevrolet |
| 1977 | Chevy Vega GT (National TV Commercial) | Lead | Chevrolet |
| 1977 | The Bionic Woman | Astronaut | Universal Studios |
| 1978 | 'Till Death | Highway Patrolman | Feature film |
| 1978 | Triumph Spitfire (National Commercial) | Lead | British Leyland |
| 1979 | Institute for Revenge | I.F.R. Agent | TV movie |
| 1980 | CBS Afternoon Playhouse (TV special) | Parker (ranch hand) | Multi – episode |
| 1981 | Gillette ATRA Razors (National Commercial) | Lead | Gillette |
| 1983 | PSA Celebrity Pets | Himself | PSA Airlines |
| 1983 | A New Day In Eden (TV series) | Clint Masterson | ONTV Cable Drama |
| 1983 | Video Santa – LA Today | Himself | LA Today ABC |
| 1985 | The Hollywood Cross (Documentary) | Himself | Ron Roy Productions |
| 1986 | Bayer Aspirin (National Commercial) | Husband | Bayer |
| 1986 | Johnson's Baby Shampoo (National Commercial) | Boyfriend | Johnson & Johnson |
| 1986 | Divorce Court (TV series) | Billy Young | Syndicated Drama |
| 1987 | Capitol (TV series) | Detective Campbell | CBS Soap Opera |
| 1988 | Oprah | Himself | Harpo Productions |
| 1988 | Zenith TV (National Commercial) | Lead | Zenith |
| 1989 | Uniroyal Laredo Tires (National Commercial) | Rancher | Uniroyal |
| 1990 | The 700 Club | Himself | CBN |
| 1992 | Entertainment Tonight | Himself | Paramount |
| 1993 | Private Life | Arthur | Ron Roy Productions |
| 1995 | L'Image Fashion Party | Host/Himself | Ron Roy Productions |
| 1994 | Entertainment Tonight | Himself | Paramount |
| 1994 | Elvis: For The Fans (Documentary) | Host | Ron Roy Productions |
| 1998-1991 | Stand Up Comics Take A Stand (TV Comedy Special) | Host | Ron Roy Productions & The Family Channel |
| 1999 | The Solution (TV Commercial) | Narrator | Ron Roy Productions |
| 2010 | Heartland USA (TV Commercial) | Narrator | Ron Roy Productions |
| 2011 | Jingle Bells Chicken | Hollywood Chicken | Ron Roy Productions |
| 2012 | Jesus Face in the Clouds (Documentary) | Host | Ron Roy Productions |
| 2018 | David Cassidy: The Last Session | Himself | A & E |

=== Producer/Director/Cinematographer ===
- 1984 – Thrill Of The Kill (Music Video)
- 1985 – The Hollywood Cross (documentary), Body Map (Fashion Rock Video)
- 1986 – Tranquility (video documentary)
- 1987 – Fleece Chemise (Fashion Rock Video), Moodtape's Energy (video) (producer/director), Floral Fantasy (video documentary)
- 1988 – Autumn Whispers... Winter Dreams
- 1988 – 1991 Stand-up Comics Take a Stand (TV movie)
- 1991 – Contemporary Christmas (video documentary), Moodtapes: Ocean Reflections (video documentary short)
- 1992 – Moodtapes: Natural Environments – Whispering Waters (video documentary)
- 1993 – Romantic Classics by Firelight (video documentary), Pacific Surf (video documentary)
- 1995 – L'Image Fashion Party Video
- 1996 – Cynara: Poetry in Motion (cinematography)
- 1997 – Moodtapes: Moments – Serenity (video documentary)
- 1998 – Nature's Bouquet (video documentary)
- 2003 – The Yule Log HD (TV movie)
- 2006 – The Future Is Now (documentary), Relax with Moodtapes (iTunes Podcast)
- 2009 – Pacific Surf (iPhone App)
- 2010 – Christmas Magic (iPhone App)
- 2011 – Jingle Bells Chicken (Christmas Music Video), Clair de Lune (Relaxation Music Video), Danny Boy (Relaxation Video), Sizzlin' Christmas (Christmas Rock Video)
- 2012 – Pacific Blue (Music Video), Serenity Prayer (Motivational Video), Jesus Face In The Clouds (Documentary)
- 2013 – Viewzzz relaxation music videos (producer/director), Tribute To America (Patriotic Rock Video), Snowy White Christmas (Music Video)
- 2014 – Oregon Waters (Nature Relaxation Video), Impressions of Winter (Music Video), Angel of the Mountain Stream (Motivational Video)
- 2018 – Horses and Heroes (documentary), Drift Away (Nature/Relaxation Video)
- 2019 – Amazing Grace Medley (Religious Music Video), Horses & Heroes II (documentary)

=== Television ===
Ron Roy and his video productions have been featured on national television programs: Entertainment Tonight, The Oprah Winfrey Show, Fox TV, MTV, VH-1, The Family Channel, The 700 Club, The Business Channel, CBS Morning Show, CNN, The Today Show etc.

== Awards and nominations ==
- Hollywood Angel Award (1985)
- Seven International Telly Awards (1992 -1995)
- New York International Fashion Video Award
- International Aegis Award (2006)
- Davey Award (2006, silver winner)
- International Accolade Award (2009)
- American Film Institute / Billboard Magazine Award (1988)
