= Jeff Pierce =

Jeff or Jeffrey Pierce may refer to:

- Jeff Pierce (cyclist) (born 1958), American road bicycle racer
- Jeff Pierce (baseball) (born 1969), Major League Baseball pitcher
- Jeffrey Pierce (born 1971), American actor, film director and film producer
- Jeffrey Lee Pierce (1958–1996), American singer, songwriter and guitarist
- Jeffrey Pierce (politician), American politician from Maine

== See also ==
- Jefferson Pierce also known as Black Lightning, a DC Comics character
- Jeff Pearce (disambiguation)
