= WXPN =

Public radio station in Philadelphia

- Philadelphia, Pennsylvania; United States
- Broadcast area: Philadelphia metropolitan area
- Frequency: 88.5 MHz (HD Radio)
- Branding: 88.5 XPN

Programming
- Format: Adult album alternative
- Subchannels: HD2: XPoNential Radio (adult album alternative)

Ownership
- Owner: University of Pennsylvania; (Trustees of the University of Pennsylvania)

History
- First air date: 1957
- Former frequencies: 88.9 MHz (1957–1990)
- Call sign meaning: "Experimental Pennsylvania Network"

Technical information
- Licensing authority: FCC
- Facility ID: 68229
- Class: B
- ERP: 2,650 watts (analog); 105 watts (digital)
- HAAT: 365 meters (1,198 ft)
- Transmitter coordinates: 40°2′19.7″N 75°14′12.8″W
- Translator: See § Translators
- Repeater: See § Stations

Links
- Public license information: Public file; LMS
- Website: xpn.org

WXPN (88.5 FM) is a non-commercial radio station licensed to the Trustees of the University of Pennsylvania in Philadelphia, Pennsylvania, that airs an adult album alternative (AAA) format. WXPN produces World Cafe, a music program distributed by NPR to non-commercial stations in the United States. The station's call sign, which is often abbreviated to XPN, stands for "Experimental Pennsylvania Network". The station's transmitter is located at the antenna farm complex, in the Roxborough section of Philadelphia.

== History ==
=== 20th century ===
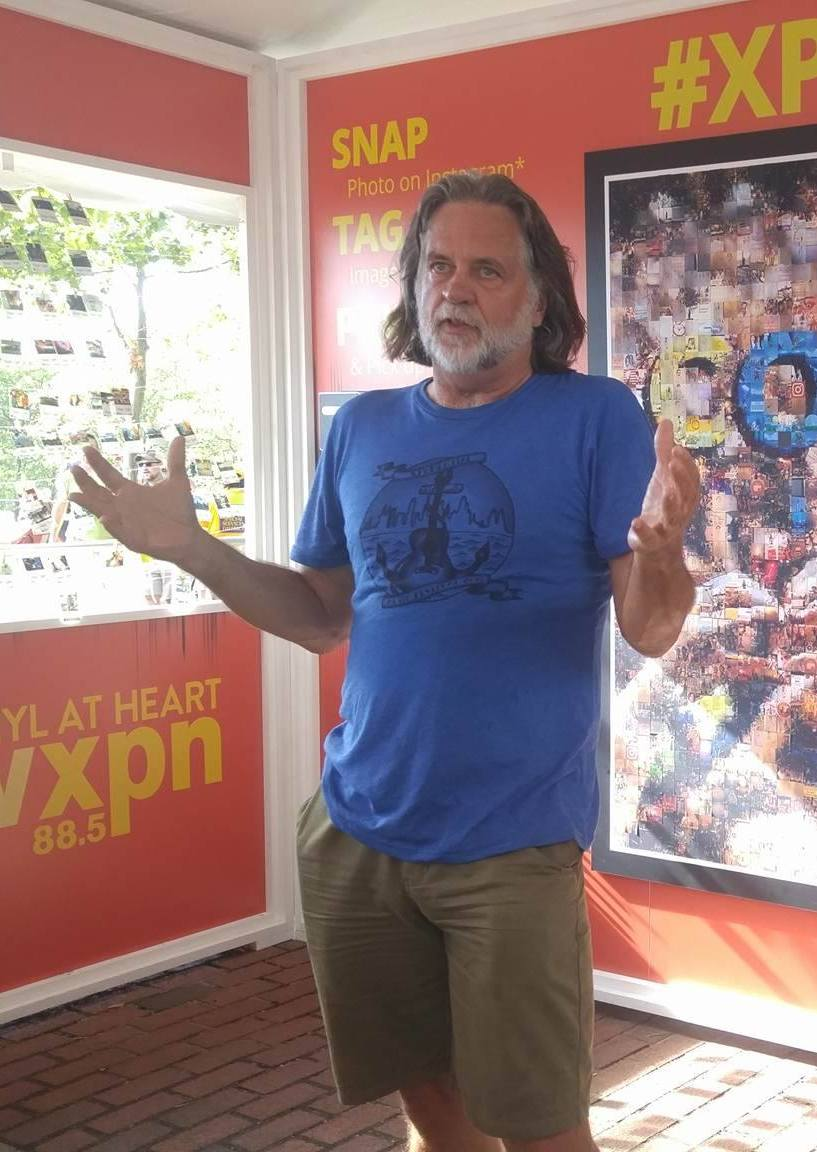
Station manager Roger LaMay speaking at the station's annual music festival

While the University of Pennsylvania has been involved with radio since 1909 when a wireless station was located in Houston Hall, WXPN itself first came into existence in 1945 as a carrier current station at 730 AM.

In 1957, it was granted a full license as a 10-watt college radio station at 88.9 FM in addition to their frequency of 730 AM. From then into the mid-1970s, WXPN was a student activity of the university. As it grew, the station initiated unique programming designs including one of the earliest freeform radio formats, Phase II, in the 1960s. Local DJ Michael Tearson got his start at WXPN in the late 1960s with a radio show The Attic. Tearson went on to replace Dave Herman at WMMR in 1970.

In 1975, a controversial broadcast on the talk show The Vegetable Report led to an obscenity complaint with the FCC, which found the charges serious enough to decline renewal of the broadcast license. This incident (December 1975) marked the first time the FCC pulled a license on grounds of obscenity. But a citizen's group organized to petition the FCC to consider XPN's unique service, and with a pledge from Penn to create positions for professional staff to run the station, the FCC allowed the license to renew.

With new staff of five managers, WXPN became a source of folk, jazz, new and avant-garde music and public affairs programming produced by a combination of station alumni and community volunteers, with little to no student involvement. Veterans of WXPN that have gone on to achievements in other areas include Broadway producer and director Harold Prince, the station's first program director, NBC News correspondent Andrea Mitchell, its former news director, jazz producer Michael Cuscuna, a former DJ, Echoes producers John Diliberto and Kimberly Haas, former producers of Diaspar and other WXPN shows, NPR reporter Greg Allen, former host of "Homegrown", and radio producer Rodger Collins, former host of "Crossroads" and "Sleepy Hollow".

Shows that have been staples on XPN since the 1970s include The Blues Show with Jonny Meister (Saturday nights), Sleepy Hollow (Saturday and Sunday morning quiet music shows), Star's End (ambient and space music Saturday night/Sunday morning) and Amazon Country (lesbian-oriented music and programming on Sunday evening). WXPN also broadcasts the Folk Show on Sunday evening, which started at WHAT-FM in 1962 and continued on WDAS-FM, WMMR, WIOQ and WHYY-FM but moved to WXPN in the 1990s when WHYY changed to a talk format.

In 1986, the station qualified for membership in the Corporation for Public Broadcasting and began the legal process to move from 88.9 to 88.5 on the FM broadcast band to increase signal coverage. Beginning the late 1980s, the programming and personnel were shifted from its diverse volunteer voice to full-time salaried programmers. Penn student radio activity is carried out on WQHS.

In 1988, WXPN started Kids Corner, a daily interactive radio show for kids hosted by Kathy O'Connell. Kids Corner has won numerous awards, including the Peabody Award and the Armstrong Award.

=== 21st century ===
In 2004, WXPN moved to new facilities at 3025 Walnut Street, where the radio station shares space with a music venue called World Cafe Live, an independent for-profit entity that pays a yearly fee to license the World Cafe name from WXPN.

In October 2015, WXPN and WNTI jointly announced a sales agreement for transfer of ownership of the Hackettstown, New Jersey, public radio station owned by Centenary College. The sale price is $1,250,000 in cash and another $500,000 in underwriting value over 10 years. A Public Service Operating Agreement enabled WXPN to begin using the WNTI transmission facilities to air WXPN programming, effective October 15, 2015. WNTI changed its call sign to WXPJ on May 16, 2016.

== Programs ==
WXPN carries primarily locally originated programs, supplemented by a few nationally syndicated shows. The station's weekday programs are all produced by its own staff, including World Cafe, a show developed and hosted by WXPN host David Dye and now distributed by NPR. The station also produces most of its night and weekend specialty programs, including Kids Corner with Kathy O'Connell, The Geator's Rock & Roll, Rhythm & Blues Express with legendary Philadelphia DJ Jerry Blavat, The Blues Show with Jonny Meister, The Folk Show with Ian Zolitor, Star's End with Chuck Van Zyl and Sleepy Hollow, an early morning program of quiet music. The station's syndicated offerings include The Grateful Dead Hour with David Gans, The Many Moods of Ben Vaughn, Echoes with John Diliberto and Mountain Stage with Larry Groce.

Q'zine, produced and hosted by Robert Drake since 1996, is a voice for the LGBTQ community in Philadelphia. The program originated as Sunshine Gaydreams, later shortened to Gaydreams, in 1974.

WXPN also broadcasts the Penn Quakers men's basketball games.

From August 15 to 18, 2019, WXPN broadcast a "Woodstock — As It Happened — 50 Years On" weekend to celebrate the 50th anniversary of the Woodstock festival. It used all of the festival's archived audio in "as close to real time as possible", using newly reconstructed audio archives of each of Woodstock's 32 performances.

== Stations ==
One full-power station (WXPH) is licensed to simulcast the programming of WXPN full-time. One full-power station (WXPJ) has a Public Service Operating Agreement to simulcast the programming of WXPN.

Call sign	Frequency	City of license	Facility ID	Class	ERP (W)	Height (m (ft))	Transmitter coordinates
WXPH (Note: WXPH covers York, Lancaster, Harrisburg, Hanover and the surrounding area.)	88.7 FM (Note: Transmits in HD Radio)	Middletown, Pennsylvania	87834	B	7,000 (vert.); 75 horiz (analog); 279 (digital)	216 m (709 ft)	40°2′7.4″N 76°37′17.9″W
WKHS (Note: WKHS only simulcasts WXPN on weekends, overnight hours and throughout the summer. Covers the Eastern Shore of Maryland, New Castle County, Delaware, Kent County, Delaware, Baltimore, Annapolis, Easton, and Havre de Grace.)	90.5 FM	Worton, Maryland	6057	B1	17,500	66 m (217 ft)	39°16′55.3″N 76°5′24.8″W
WXPJ (Note: WXPJ covers Hackettstown, northern New Jersey and northeastern Pennsylvania.)	91.9 FM	Hackettstown, New Jersey	9759	B1	5,400 (analog); 216 (digital)	167 m (548 ft)	40°51′8.3″N 74°52′23.6″W

=== Translators ===
WXPN programming is broadcast on the following translators:

Call sign	Frequency (MHz)	City of license	Facility ID	Class	ERP (W)	Height (m (ft))	Transmitter coordinates	Rebroadcasts
W259AU	99.7	Harrisburg, Pennsylvania	153367	D	10	209.2 meters (686 ft)	40°18′20.3″N 77°00′25.9″W	WXPH
W285DH	104.9	North Whitehall Township, Pennsylvania	69361	D	13	105 m (344 ft)	40°40′22.3″N 75°34′40.6″W	WXPJ

From 1993 to 2007, the WXPH call sign was used on 88.1 in Harrisburg, now WZXM. WXPN traded that facility to Four Rivers Community Broadcasting in return for 88.7 Middletown and W259AU.

Portions of WXPN's schedule are simulcast on WKHS 90.5 FM, Worton, Maryland (Eastern Shore Chesapeake Bay and Baltimore areas).

== WXPN-HD2 ==
=== History ===
On May 2, 2007, WXPN launched an indie rock format on its HD2 channel, branded as "Y-Rock on XPN". Y-Rock on XPN featured on-air personalities originally from Philadelphia radio station WPLY (100.3 FM), branded as "Y100". WPLY owner Radio One changed the station's format in 2005, ending the alternative rock format. Y-Rock on XPN was the latest incarnation of the Y100 brand that originally aired on WPLY, which was the market's alternative rock station from 1995 until 2005.

In mid-June 2010, "Y-Rock on XPN" programming was cancelled due to budget cuts. The "Y-Rock on XPN" branding officially changed to XPN2 at midnight, June 15, 2011. The HD2 channel and companion online stream would later be re-branded as "XpoNential Radio".

== WQHS ==
WQHS internet radio is the only wholly student-operated college radio station at the University of Pennsylvania. WXPN was the University's principal student radio station until 1975, with WQHS as an AM-based training ground for DJs. After 1975, WQHS became the official student radio station of the University, with WXPN being taken over by an external company. The radio station currently broadcasts an eclectic freeform radio format.

=== History ===
In the 1960s, the University had two radio stations with the call sign WXPN, an FM station at 88.9 MHz and an AM station at 730 kHz. The AM radio station broadcast as a non-licensed carrier current radio station, and able to be heard only on the University grounds. Both radio stations consisted of educational programming, news and sports coverage, as well as music. In 1965, WXPN AM started airing popular music shows, stirring interest among the students. At the time, the radio station operated out of Houston Hall, directly in the center of campus.

In 1970, WXPN-AM's operations moved from Houston Hall, directly in the center of campus, to 3905 Spruce Street. After problems with the FCC over show content in the 1970s, WXPN-FM's broadcast license was not renewed. WXPN AM then became WQHS, which stands for "Quad Hill Superblock" (referring to student dormitories on campus). As it had not been involved with the FCC dispute, WQHS remained completely student-run while WXPN was afterwards run by a mix of community volunteers and former students. The stations developed two distinct styles, with WQHS focused more on contemporary music and WXPN reflecting the more esoteric interests of its staff. This ultimately led to a complete split between the stations, with both moving from their common Spruce Street location. The FM radio station became professionally run by 1980, with former students and community volunteers staffing the station, while the AM radio station was still student-run. As of September 2005, the radio station is located on the fifth floor of the Hollenback Center, on the far east side of campus.
