= Star's End =

New-age music radio show

- Genre: New-age, ambient, electronic, space
- Running time: 5 hours
- Country of origin: USA
- Language: English
- Home station: WXPN, Philadelphia
- Hosted by: Chuck Van Zyl
- Created by: John Diliberto and Steve Pross
- Original release: 1976
- Website: www.starsend.org

Star's End is also a 1974 album by British composer David Bedford and a 1982 novel by Glen Cook.

Star's End is a weekly, five-hour-long new-age music radio show broadcast by 88.5 WXPN, the University of Pennsylvania's radio station, in Philadelphia. It is the second longest-running show of its type in the world, after Hearts of Space.

== History ==
Star's End was started in 1976 by Steve Pross and John Diliberto as a five-hour-long evening program. Diliberto later went on to host the syndicated nightly ambient music show Echoes. In 1977 Gino Wong began sharing duties with Diliberto when Steve Pross entered the recording industry. At that point the concept was solidified and the opening theme that is still used today was produced. Gordon Danis (1957–2008) joined for a short time in 1978 bringing his passion for early ambient music to the mix. In 1979 Wong began producing records and concerts, creating an opening for guest hosts including Janet Quigley and Kimberly Haas. Beginning in the early 1980s Star's End went through an extended rotation of several different DJs. Original programmers Diliberto left in 1986 and Wong in 1988. The current host is Chuck Van Zyl.

== Production details ==
Star's End is broadcast late Saturday nights / Sunday mornings from 1:00 AM through 6:00 AM. In the late 1980s an earlier edition was added on Friday nights from 11:00 PM to 2:00 AM. This "matinee" edition lasted for 3 or 4 years. The show features uninterrupted, hour-long segue-mixed music selections. The show's website lists a variety of ambient genres and related styles as present in its playlist, including space music, new-age, electronic music, world music, avant-garde, classical and even spoken word performances. In the past, Star's End has featured guest DJs mixing ambient music, and has also broadcast live in-studio performances by Robert Rich, Jonn Serrie, 302 Acid, Steve Roach, Radio Massacre International and others.

== Related projects ==
In recent years Chuck van Zyl has organised a number of live concert performances in Philadelphia by various ambient artists, under the Star's End banner. Known as "The Gatherings" series, performers have included Steve Roach, Robert Rich, Radio Massacre International, Jeff Greinke, Erik Wøllo and van Zyl's own group, The Ministry of Inside Things, along with numerous others. Several independent CD recordings of performances recorded at these concerts have subsequently been released by van Zyl under his Synkronos label.

== See also ==
- Echoes, a nightly ambient music show produced by music critic John Diliberto
- Hearts of Space, a US-based ambient radio programme produced since 1973 by Stephen Hill
- Musical Starstreams, a US-based commercial radio program produced and hosted by Forest since 1981
- Ultima Thule Ambient Music, a weekly ambient music radio show broadcast on community radio in Australia since 1989
