= WXPJ =

Simulcasts WXPN, Philadelphia
- Hackettstown, New Jersey; United States
- Broadcast area: Hackettstown, New Jersey
- Frequency: 91.9 MHz (HD Radio)
- Branding: XPN

Programming
- Language: English
- Format: Adult album alternative

Ownership
- Owner: University of Pennsylvania; (The Trustees of the University of Pennsylvania)
- Sister stations: WXPN, WXPH, WKHS

History
- First air date: December 7, 1957
- Former call signs: WNTI (1957–2016)
- Call sign meaning: similar to WXPN

Technical information
- Licensing authority: FCC
- Facility ID: 9759
- Class: B
- ERP: 5,400 watts (Analog); 216 watts (Digital); 13 watts (104.9 FM)
- HAAT: 167 meters (548 ft); 105 meters (344 ft) (104.9 FM)
- Transmitter coordinates: 40°51′07″N 74°52′35″W
- Translator: 104.9 W285DH (North Whitehall Township)

Links
- Public license information: Public file; LMS

WXPJ (91.9 FM) is a non-commercial radio station licensed to Hackettstown, New Jersey. The station is owned by the University of Pennsylvania in Philadelphia.

Originally operated as WNTI-FM by Centenary University (then College), the station was purchased in 2015 by University of Pennsylvania's AAA public station WXPN. The call sign WXPJ was adopted the next year. WXPJ simulcasts WXPN's programming, reaching listeners in the Northwestern New Jersey and Northeastern Pennsylvania markets.

Centenary University students and community volunteers continue to operate WNTI as an internet radio station via wnti.com.

== History ==
WXPJ signed on in December 1957 as WNTI, broadcasting programs produced by Centenary College students as well as the Centenary Singers. The call letters stood for Nosce Te Ipsum, a latin phrase meaning "know thyelf."

WNTI evolved from broadcasting a few hours per day during the school year (in 1995 under the leadership of professor Eric Slater) to being on the air 365 days a year, 24 hours a day.

WNTI commemorated its 40th anniversary in December 1997 with a CD release entitled "A Celebration of WNTI." The CD featured many musicians who over the years appeared on the station with in-studio performances and played at station fund raisers. It was produced by Ralph Drake, who served as Program director for over a decade.

The station evolved over the years, as Centenary College moved from being an all-women's college to coed in the late 1980s. Under the Direction of Prof. Eric Slater and then student Ralph Drake in 1995 WNTI, was one of the first in the world to "webcast" on the internet, thanks to a free encoder given to the station by Real Networks.

In October 2015, WNTI and University of Pennsylvania station WXPN jointly announced a sales agreement for transfer of ownership of WNTI. The sale price is $1,250,000 in cash and another $500,000 in underwriting value over 10 years. A Public Service Operating Agreement enabled WXPN to begin using the WNTI transmission facilities to air WXPN programming, effective October 15, 2015.

On May 16, 2016, the FM station changed its call sign to WXPJ. The sale to the University of Pennsylvania was consummated on June 14, 2016.

== WNTI.org - Internet Radio ==
WNTI.org broadcasts on the web primarily featured an Adult Album Alternative format with the slogan "The Sound of Centenary," "Where Great Music Lives" and "Internet Radio from Centenary College". The station broadcasts jazz, world, bluegrass, blues and other music programs on nights and weekends. Most of the programming was locally originated. However, the station also carried nationally syndicated programs including World Cafe, Little Steven's Underground Garage and Acoustic Cafe.

The station continues to sponsor local concert series, car shows and other events.
