= Jazz Profiles =

American radio show on NPR (1995–2002)

- Running time: 60 minutes
- Country of origin: United States
- Home station: NPR
- Hosted by: Nancy Wilson
- Produced by: Tim Owens
- Original release: August 1995 – 2002
- Website: www.npr.org/series/10208861/npr-s-jazz-profiles

Jazz Profiles was an American radio show produced by NPR and hosted by the jazz singer Nancy Wilson. It featured hour-long retrospectives on the lives of famous jazz musicians, or sometimes on famous albums, such as Miles Davis's Kind of Blue. The show covers a wide range of jazz musicians, from the very famous to the lesser-known but still notable, such as Jon Hendricks. It won a Peabody Award in 2002 "for an innovative presentation of the world of jazz, honoring the works and the great artists of this unique American musical form."

The show began in 1995, when lead producer Tim Owens and Nancy Wilson teamed up to create a weekly documentary series. The first episode, broadcast in August 1995, was a two-hour program celebrating the 75th birthday of jazz legend Charlie Parker. Most subsequent shows ran one hour and most focused on the life of one jazz musician. Exceptions included a special about the Village Vanguard, a two-part series about Miles Davis, a three-part exploration of lyricism in jazz, and a two-part special about Nat King Cole.

The show ran seven years until its ending in 2002. Over 200 episodes were aired.
