= Ambient video =

Video genre emphasizing atmosphere over storytelling

Ambient video is a genre of video that puts emphasis on atmosphere over traditional storytelling or news content. Its purpose is to create a soothing, pleasant environment through the use of imagery. A typical video might include footage of waves rolling over the beach accompanied by soft ambient music. Some additional examples might include movement of water, sunrise or sunset, or slow movement such as that of a jellyfish. Ambient video can be the subject of focus or alternatively run unobtrusively in the background.

== Uses ==
Because of its ability to transform spaces, ambient video is often used for meditation or relaxation. In addition to providing visual focus, ambient video can figuratively transport viewers to new locations and, although is often accompanied by, is not dependent on music.

Although ambient video often serves as background art, its visual nature allows it to also be used:

- as a meditation tool
- to explore new locations
- as an aid for concentration or productivity
- to create atmosphere at home or in public places
- as a calming backdrop homes or public places (such as airports, hotels, hospitals, restaurants, shopping venues and so forth)

== History of ambient video ==
Ambient video is a new art form made possible by the increasing availability of large-scale, high-definition video display units. Introduced in the late 1990s, the first flat wide-screen televisions were expensive, costing as much as $15,000 in 1997. As costs rapidly declined, by 2008 larger screens became affordable and available for average consumers, increasing the demand for new content. In addition, the number of televisions per household increased. According to the U.S. Energy Information Administration, in 1997 30% of households had three or more televisions compared to 39% in 2015.

== See also ==
- Ambient music
- Video art
- Brian Eno
- Meditation
- Widescreen
