= Echoes (radio program) =

US radio program

- Genre: Ambient music, Electronic music, New Acoustic music dreampop alternative rock and other related styles
- Running time: 2 hours, nightly
- Country of origin: United States
- Language: English
- Syndicates: Public Radio Exchange
- Hosted by: John Diliberto
- Created by: John Diliberto; Kimberly Haas
- Written by: John Diliberto
- Produced by: Jeff Towne
- Executive producers: John Diliberto (2011-present); Kimberly Haas (1989-2011)
- Original release: October 1989 – present
- Website: echoes.org
- Podcast: echoes.org/podcasts/feed

Echoes is a daily two-hour music radio program hosted by John Diliberto featuring a soundscape of ambient, space, electronica, and new-age music. The program features in-depth artist interviews and intimate "living room" performances. Interview subjects have included Brian Eno, Peter Gabriel, Laurie Anderson, and Philip Glass. Live performers have included Yo-Yo Ma, Pat Metheny, Loreena McKennitt, Steve Roach, Air and many others. Echoes has produced sixteen CD collections from these and other in-studio performances. Distributed by Public Radio Exchange, Echoes is currently heard on about 80 radio stations. Echoes can also be heard on the web, with 24/7 streaming and on-demand audio available.

Echoes was created in 1989 by Kimberly Haas and John Diliberto, a music journalist whose works have appeared in Billboard, Pulse, Jazziz, Down Beat, Musician, and Amazon.com. He has also produced Peabody Award-winning documentaries for National Public Radio's Jazz Profiles. Haas and Diliberto had previously produced the award-winning documentary series Totally Wired (1982–1989), which won Columbia University's Major Armstrong Award, the Ohio State Award, and the National Federation of Community Broadcaster's Award.

Both Haas and Diliberto began their careers at WXPN while students at the University of Pennsylvania. Diliberto was music director from 1974 to 1976. Haas was Program Director from 1980 until 1986. Diliberto founded the space music program Star's End in 1976, and it remains on the air to this day.

Echoes has also produced 23 CDs of live performances from the program. The latest is Victoria Place: Echoes Live 23.

== See also ==
- Hearts of Space, a US-based ambient radio program produced since 1973 by Stephen Hill
- Musical Starstreams, a US-based commercial radio program produced and hosted by F. J. Forest (a.k.a. "Forest") since 1981
- Star's End, a weekly ambient music program broadcast on public radio in Philadelphia since 1976, hosted by Chuck van Zyl
- Ultima Thule Ambient Music, a weekly ambient music radio show broadcast on community radio in Australia since 1989
