= 3MBS =

- Melbourne, Victoria; Australia
- Frequency: 103.5 MHz

Programming
- Format: Classical, Jazz

Ownership
- Owner: Music Broadcasting Society of Victoria Limited; (Music Broadcasting Society of Victoria Limited)

History
- First air date: 1 July 1975; 51 years ago
- Former frequencies: FM: 92.5 MHz (1975); FM: 93.7 MHz (1975-1988)

Technical information
- Transmitter coordinates: 37.8364°S 145.3472°E

Links
- Website: www.3mbs.org.au

3MBS is an FM radio station in Victoria, Australia, and began transmitting to Melbourne and surrounding areas on 1 July 1975. Since then it has operated successfully as a non-profit community-based organisation broadcasting classical and jazz music. 3MBS also led the way for the introduction of community radio in Australia back in 1968.

It is part of the national Australian Fine Music Network.

== History ==
The increasing popularity of rock music through the late 1950s and 1960s led to a reduction in the amount of classical music played on the ABC and commercial radio stations in Australia. Up until the early 1950s most radio stations employed orchestras to play music which included classical music. By the 1960s, only the ABC supported its own orchestra. But even the ABC had dramatically reduced the amount of classical music on air.

A music fan and radio engineer, Brian Cabena, was unhappy about being unable to listen to the music he liked on the radio - and he did something about it. After much unsuccessful lobbying of radio stations, he turned his attention to the government. He argued that if the existing stations were not willing to program for classical music fans, the government should license new stations that would.

In 1968, Cabena wrote a letter to The Age calling a meeting of anyone interested in pursuing the idea of a listener-run classical music radio station. 200 people turned up and the Music Broadcasting Society (MBS) of Victoria was born. The group spent years lobbying the government for what they called "listener controlled" radio.

The government rejected their approaches. The initial response from the government was that the AM band was full and the existing stations catered for the majority of listener needs. But Brian Cabena was persistent and eventually convinced the government that the FM band would work for metropolitan-wide broadcasting.

After a change of government in 1972, public, or what is now termed community broadcasting got off the ground. People from the Melbourne MBS station travelled to Sydney and started up a Sydney MBS, 2MBS, which had the same aims: for people who liked classical music to volunteer to operate a radio station that would principally broadcast classical music.

2MBS went to air in late 1974 and Brian Cabena got 3MBS to air in July 1975. This led to the development of a range of community radio stations catering for diverse interests across the country.

At 6.30pm in July 1975, 3MBS played Carl Orff's Carmina Burana as its first licensed broadcast. It was not only the first community broadcaster to be heard in Victoria, but also the first radio station in the State to transmit on the newly established FM band.

3MBS originally broadcast on 92.5 MHz on the FM band. By November 1975 it had moved to 93.7 MHz before moving to its current position of 103.5 MHz in 1988 when a number of Melbourne FM radio stations were assigned new frequencies.

The station was able to operate through subscription (initially set at $10 per annum) contributed by all those who shared the need to have a station in Melbourne broadcasting classical music.

The advent of ABC-FM in 1976 caused a drop in the number of subscribers to 3MBS. However, as people realised that they could have the best of both worlds, by switching from one station to the other in order to hear music to which they wished to listen, the subscriber base moved upwards again, so that by the 1980s 3MBS was financially secure.

== Support for local music ==
From the early 90s, 3MBS took its charter to support local music seriously. In association with the Music Society of Victoria, the station developed the 3MBS Young Performers Award. In the year 2000, it developed a National Composer Award.

Apart from the broad spectrum of music presented, 3MBS has actively encouraged and supported the endeavours of local musicians, recording and later broadcasting their concerts and recitals. It also conducts a Musicians-in-Residence programme, a Daily Arts Diary and Accidental Arts programme.
