= Musical Starstreams =

Radio program

- Other names: Starstreams, Music for Your Inner Space
- Country of origin: United States
- Original release: December 1981
- Website: starstreams.com

Musical Starstreams (also known as Starstreams) is a terrestrial and internet radio program that first aired in the San Francisco bay area in December 1981. Originally known as Music for Your Inner Space, it has been produced, programmed and hosted by Forest, originally in Mill Valley and now from Maui, for its entire forty year history, except for a twelve-month period from mid-2002, when Madison Cole hosted the show.

In 1983 the two-hour weekly show began syndication on commercial terrestrial radio, and in 1985 was picked up for distribution outside the US. It has been heard on over 200 noncommercial and commercial radio stations, cable systems, the internet, XM satellite radio channels and DirecTV. Although initially scoring good ratings nationwide, the show peaked in numbers of terrestrial stations in 1991, the same year it was nominated for Billboard magazine's 'Adult Syndicated Program of the Year.' With the volatile nature of commercial radio stations continually changing formats, terrestrial station coverage has significantly declined to a point where by their own website's count, they list around a dozen radio stations which they attribute to the decline in terrestrial station listening and the increased popularity of the internet where more listeners have chosen to listen online to the program in its current form. A more music intensive version of Starstreams can currently be heard online on Mixcloud and iHeart Media.

Back in the 1980s the show played a mix of electronic, new-age and a small amount of jazz, Today, it has more of a Chill music core, sometimes characterized as mid- to down-tempo "exotic electronica". Back in the early days it was also sometimes described as "Marin County hot-tub music" a tongue in cheek reference to its former home just across the Golden Gate Bridge from San Francisco.

== See also ==
- Echoes, a nightly ambient music show produced by music critic John Diliberto
- Hearts of Space, a US-based ambient radio programme produced since 1973 by Stephen Hill
- Star's End, a weekly ambient music programme broadcast on public radio in Philadelphia since 1976, hosted by Chuck van Zyl
- Ultima Thule Ambient Music, a weekly ambient music radio show broadcast on community radio in Australia since 1989
