= ArtSound FM =

Community radio station in Canberra, Australia

ArtSound FM (1ART)

Canberra, Australian Capital Territory; Australia
- Broadcast area: Canberra RA1 ()
- Frequency: 92.7 MHz
- Branding: ArtSound

Programming
- Language: English
- Format: Music and fine arts

Ownership
- Owner: ArtSound, Inc.

History
- First air date: 15 July 2000

Technical information
- Licensing authority: ACMA
- ERP: 20,000 watts
- HAAT: 332 m
- Transmitter coordinates: 35°16′32″S 149°5′52″E
- Repeater: 90.3 MHz Tuggeranong

Links
- Public licence information: Profile
- Website: Official website

ArtSound FM (callsign 1ART) is a community radio station broadcasting to Canberra from studios in the suburb of Manuka. Its format is fine music and arts programming.

ArtSound was established in the early 1980s under the name Canberra Stereo Public Radio. It is a volunteer run organisation and is listener funded with support from the ACT Government and the Community Broadcasting Foundation.

ArtSound is a member of the Community Broadcasting Association of Australia and the Australian Fine Music Network. The station also operates ArtSound Audio Services with production/recording studios providing facilities for audio recording, CD duplication and archiving.

== Programming ==
ArtSound music content is Jazz, Classical, Blues, Folk and World music. It also broadcasts programs on literature, theatre, film, spoken word, art exhibitions and local concerts. Part of its commitment to supporting the Canberra arts community is a schedule of arts-related news and information programs. Also it supports local jazz, classical, blues and folk musicians with live performance broadcasts.

== See also ==
- List of radio stations in Australia
