= Hearts of Space =

Weekly syndicated radio show

- Genre: Ambient, new-age, electronic, space, and related contemplative music
- Running time: 60 minutes, weekly
- Country of origin: United States
- Language: English
- Syndicates: self-distributed to 100+ public radio stations (2009), PRX
- Hosted by: 1973–1974; Stephen Hill; 1974–1986; Stephen Hill, Anna Turner; 1987–present Stephen Hill
- Created by: Stephen Hill
- Produced by: Steve Davis
- Executive producer: Stephen Hill
- Recording studio: San Rafael, California
- Original release: 1973 – present
- Website: www.hos.com

Hearts of Space is an American weekly syndicated public radio show featuring music of a contemplative nature drawn largely from the ambient, new-age and electronic genres, while also including classical, world, Celtic, experimental, and other music selections. For many years, the show's producer and presenter, Stephen Hill, has applied the term "space music" to the music broadcast on the show, irrespective of genre. It is the longest-running radio program of its type in the world. Each episode ends with Hill gently saying, "Safe journeys, space fans ... wherever you are."

== History ==
Hearts of Space was created in 1973 by Stephen Hill, and co-produced by Hill and Anna Turner. It was first broadcast as Music from the Hearts of Space, a three-hour-long late-night show on KPFA in Berkeley, California. It was hosted by Hill under the on-air pseudonym "Timotheo", with Turner becoming co-host from 1974 to 1986 as "Annamystic".

Shortened to a one-hour version, it entered syndication on public radio on January 1, 1983, and quickly grew in popularity, signing its 200th station within three years. In December 2009, it was still broadcast by over 200 public radio stations weekly. Until April 1, 2010, the show was also broadcast nightly by XM Satellite Radio. Beginning on its Audio Visions channel in 2001, older shows aired weeknights at 11 PM ET. The current week's show was broadcast on Saturdays at 9 AM ET, then repeated on Sundays at 9 PM ET. After the merger, Sirius XM Satellite Radio moved the program to its Spa channel until discontinuing it. On January 4, 2013, the show celebrated a milestone broadcasting its 1000th program on the 40th anniversary of its KPFA debut and 30th anniversary month/year of its national syndication on NPR. On November 12, 2021, it reached its latest milestone, 1,300 installments of the show have been produced.

== Production details ==
Episodes, or "transmissions," are thematic, commencing with a voice-over introduction by Hill, followed by almost an hour of uninterrupted segue-mixed music. The show concludes with back-announced track details. Before she left the program in 1986, co-producer Anna Turner jointly announced the show with Hill. As of June 2009, Hearts of Space is presented by Hill and produced by Hill and Associate Producer Steve Davis. A number of other individuals have worked on Hearts of Space, including guest producer Ellen Holmes who created a series of "Adagio Recordings classical spacemusic" shows.

== Related projects ==
The Hearts of Space radio show has spawned a number of related projects, including the Hearts of Space Archive, a commercial ambient-music streaming service started in 2001, and a record label started in 1984, Hearts of Space Records (including 5 divisions, sub-labels or label imprints: Hearts of Space Records, for the core space music; Hearts O' Space, for Irish/Celtic albums; World Class, for world-music albums; Fathom, for sounding the deep, dark ambient albums by artists such as Robert Rich and Steve Roach; and RGB, for soundtrack and pop-oriented electronic albums). The record label released nearly 150 albums over the course of its existence; it also licensed and released European albums in the U.S. During the 1980s Hill also produced albums for other labels, such as those of Eckart Rahn (Celestial Harmonies, Fortuna Records, and Kuckuck Schallplatten). In 2001, the label (and catalogue) was sold to Valley Entertainment. Stephen Hill, though no longer associated with the label's business side, continues to work on A&R and to produce new compilation recordings for the label.

== Cultural influence ==
The show was parodied on Mystery Science Theater 3000 episode 303 (Pod People). A running gag during the film, which sported an ambient noise soundtrack similar to the music typical of the show, was to imitate the announcer of the program. One of the host segments featured "Music from Some Guys in Space" as a parody of the show. According to the Amazing Colossal Episode Guide, the MST3k staff were sent several albums from the Hearts of Space producers after the episode aired.

== See also ==
- Echoes, a nightly ambient music show produced by music critic John Diliberto
- Musical Starstreams, a US-based commercial radio program produced and hosted by Frank Forest since 1981
- Star's End, a weekly ambient music programme broadcast on public radio in Philadelphia since 1976, hosted by Chuck van Zyl
- Ultima Thule Ambient Music, a weekly ambient music show broadcast on community radio in Australia since 1989
