= Ambient music =

Music genre

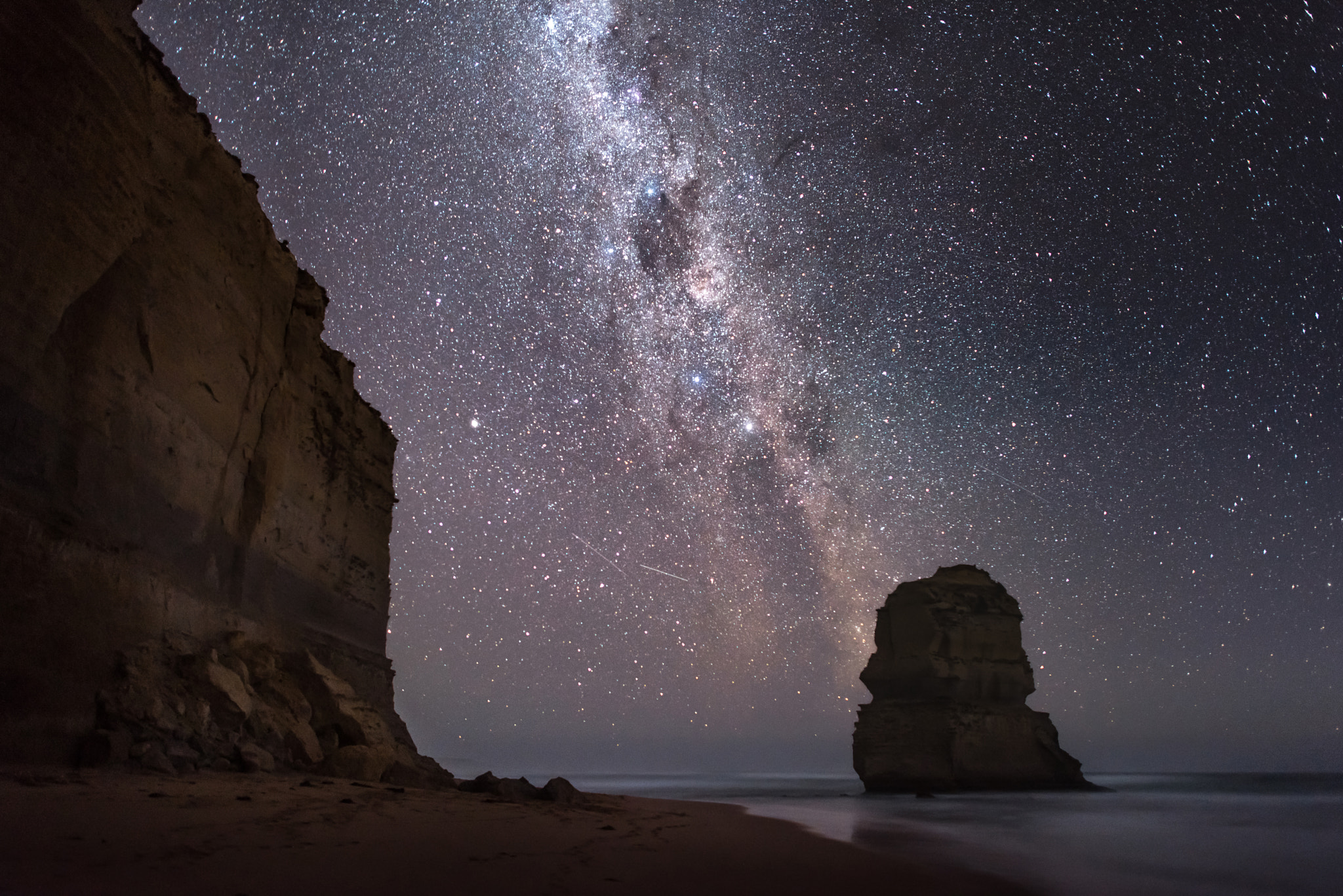
- Sounds of natural habitats are common in YouTube uploads of ambient music, with their thumbnails typically having images of landscapes and/or space, to attract listeners.
- Stylistic origins: Background music; beautiful music; drone; dub; easy listening; electronic; experimental; impressionist (furniture); krautrock; kosmische musik; light music; minimal
- Cultural origins: 1960s–70s, Japan and United Kingdom
- Derivative forms: Biomusic; chill-out; downtempo; IDM; new age; post-rock; space music; trance; trip hop

Subgenres
- Dark ambient; drone; lowercase

Fusion genres
- Ambient black metal; ambient dub; ambient house; ambient pop; ambient techno; atmospheric drum and bass; illbient; psybient

Other topics
- Ambient artists; list of electronic music genres; noise music

Ambient music is a genre of music that emphasizes tone and atmosphere over traditional musical structure or rhythm. Often "peaceful" sounding and lacking composition, beat, and/or structured melody, ambient music uses textural layers of sound that can reward both passive and active listening, and encourage a sense of calm or contemplation. The genre evokes an "atmospheric", "visual", or "unobtrusive" quality. Nature soundscapes may be included, and some works use sustained or repeated notes, as in drone music. Bearing elements associated with new-age music, instruments such as the piano, strings and flute may be emulated through a synthesizer.

The genre originated in the 1960s and 1970s, when new musical instruments were being introduced to a wider market, such as the synthesizer. It was presaged by Erik Satie's furniture music and styles such as musique concrète, minimal music, Jamaican dub music and German electronic music, but was prominently named and popularized by British musician Brian Eno in 1978 with his album Ambient 1: Music for Airports. Eno opined that ambient music "must be as ignorable as it is interesting". Other pioneers in this genre include Tangerine Dream, Klaus Schulze, Wendy Carlos, and Kraftwerk. It saw a revival towards the late 1980s with the prominence of house and techno music, and had a cult following by the 1990s.

Ambient music has not achieved large commercial success. Nevertheless, it has attained a certain degree of acclaim throughout the years, especially in the Internet age. With its relatively open style, ambient music often takes influences from a wide range of genres, including classical, avant-garde music, experimental music, folk, jazz, and world music.

== History ==
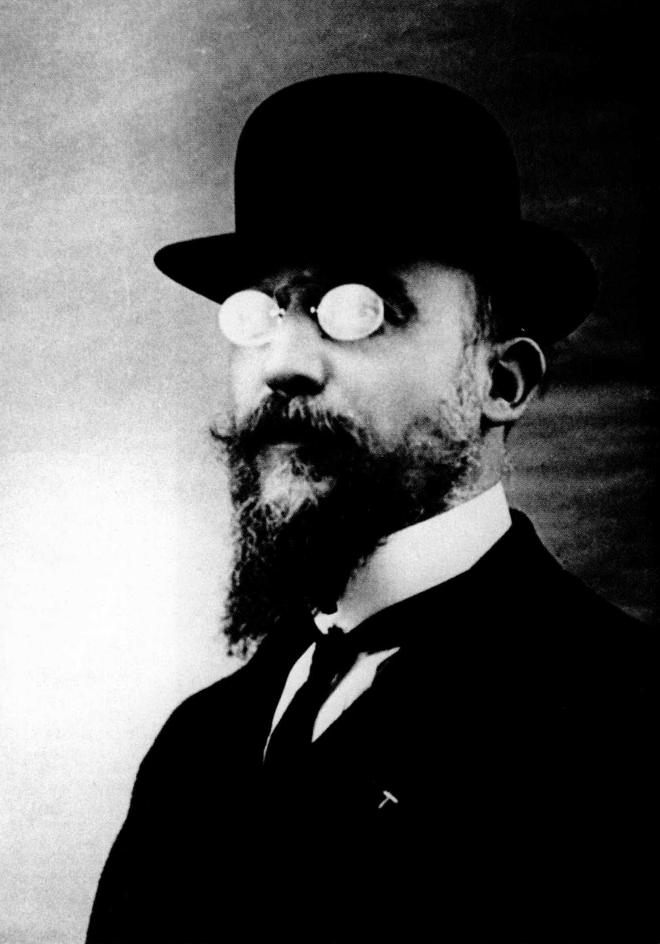
Erik Satie is acknowledged as an important precursor to modern ambient music and an influence on Brian Eno.

As an early 20th-century French composer, Erik Satie used such Dadaist-inspired explorations to create an early form of ambient/background music that he labeled "furniture music" (Musique d'ameublement). This he described as being the sort of music that could be played during a dinner to create a background atmosphere for that activity, rather than serving as the focus of attention.

In his own words, Satie sought to create "a music...which will be part of the noises of the environment, will take them into consideration. I think of it as melodious, softening the noises of the knives and forks at dinner, not dominating them, not imposing itself. It would fill up those heavy silences that sometime fall between friends dining together. It would spare them the trouble of paying attention to their own banal remarks. And at the same time it would neutralize the street noises which so indiscreetly enter into the play of conversation. To make such music would be to respond to a need."

In 1948, French composer & engineer, Pierre Schaeffer coined the term musique concrète. This experimental style of music used recordings of natural sounds that were then modified, manipulated or effected to create a composition. Schaeffer's techniques of using tape loops and splicing are considered to be the precursor to modern day sampling.

In 1952, John Cage released his famous three-movement composition 4'33 which is a performance of complete silence for four minutes and thirty-three seconds. The piece is intended to capture the ambient sounds of the venue/location of the performance and have that be the music played. Cage has been cited by seminal artists such as Brian Eno as influence.

=== 1960s ===
In the 1960s, many music groups experimented with unusual methods, with some of them creating what would later be called ambient music.

In the summer of 1962, composers Ramon Sender and Morton Subotnick founded The San Francisco Tape Music Center which functioned both as an electronic music studio and concert venue. Other composers working with tape recorders became members and collaborators including Pauline Oliveros, Terry Riley and Steve Reich. Their compositions, among others, contributed to the development of minimal music (also called minimalism), which shares many similar concepts to ambient music such as repetitive patterns or pulses, steady drones, and consonant harmony.

Many records were released in Europe and the United States of America between the mid-1960s and the mid-1990s that established the conventions of the ambient genre in the anglophone popular music market. Some 1960s records with ambient elements include Music for Yoga Meditation and Other Joys and Music for Zen Meditation by Tony Scott, Soothing Sounds for Baby by Raymond Scott, and the first record of the environments album series by Irv Teibel.

In the late 1960s, French composer Éliane Radigue composed several pieces by processing tape loops from the feedback between two tape recorders and a microphone. In the 1970s, she then went on to compose similar music almost exclusively with an ARP 2500 synthesiser, and her long, slow compositions have often been compared to drone music. In 1969, the group COUM Transmissions were performing sonic experiments in British art schools. Pearls Before Swine's 1968 album Balaklava features the sounds of birdsong and ocean noise, which were to become tropes of ambient music."

=== 1970s ===
Developing in the 1970s, ambient music stemmed from the experimental and synthesizer-oriented styles of the period.

Between 1974 and 1976, American composer Laurie Spiegel created her seminal work The Expanding Universe, created on a computer-analog hybrid system called GROOVE. In 1977, her composition, Music of the Spheres was included on Voyager 1 and 2's Golden Record.

In April 1975, Suzanne Ciani gave two performances on her Buchla synthesizer – one at the WBAI Free music store and one at Phil Niblock's loft. These performances were released on an archival album in 2016 entitled Buchla Concerts 1975. According to the record label, these concerts were part live presentation, part grant application and part educational demonstration.

However, it was not until Brian Eno coined the term in the mid-70s that ambient music was defined as a genre. Eno went on to record 1975's Discreet Music with this in mind, suggesting that it be listened to at "comparatively low levels, even to the extent that it frequently falls below the threshold of audibility", referring to Satie's quote about his musique d'ameublement.

Other contemporaneous musicians creating ambient-style music at the time included Jamaican dub musicians such as King Tubby, Japanese electronic music composers such as Isao Tomita and Ryuichi Sakamoto as well as the psychoacoustic soundscapes of Irv Teibel's Environments series, and German experimental bands such as Popol Vuh, Cluster, Kraftwerk, Harmonia, Ash Ra Tempel and Tangerine Dream. Mike Orme of Stylus Magazine describes the work of Berlin school musicians as "laying the groundwork" for ambient.

The impact the rise of the synthesizer in modern music had on ambient as a genre cannot be overstated; as Ralf Hutter of early electronic pioneers Kraftwerk said in a 1977 Billboard interview: "Electronics is beyond nations and colors...with electronics everything is possible. The only limit is with the composer". The Yellow Magic Orchestra developed a distinct style of ambient electronic music that would later be developed into ambient house music.

==== Brian Eno ====
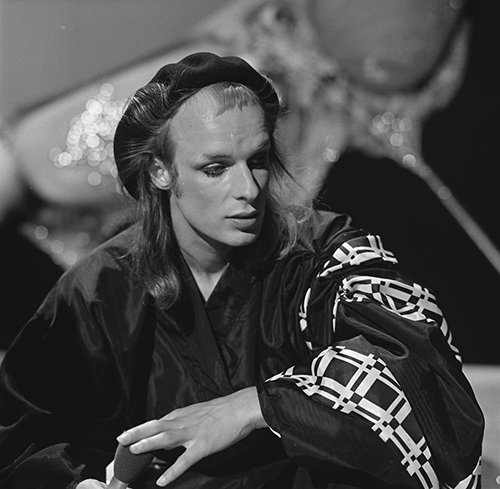
Brian Eno (pictured in 1974) is credited with coining the term "ambient music".

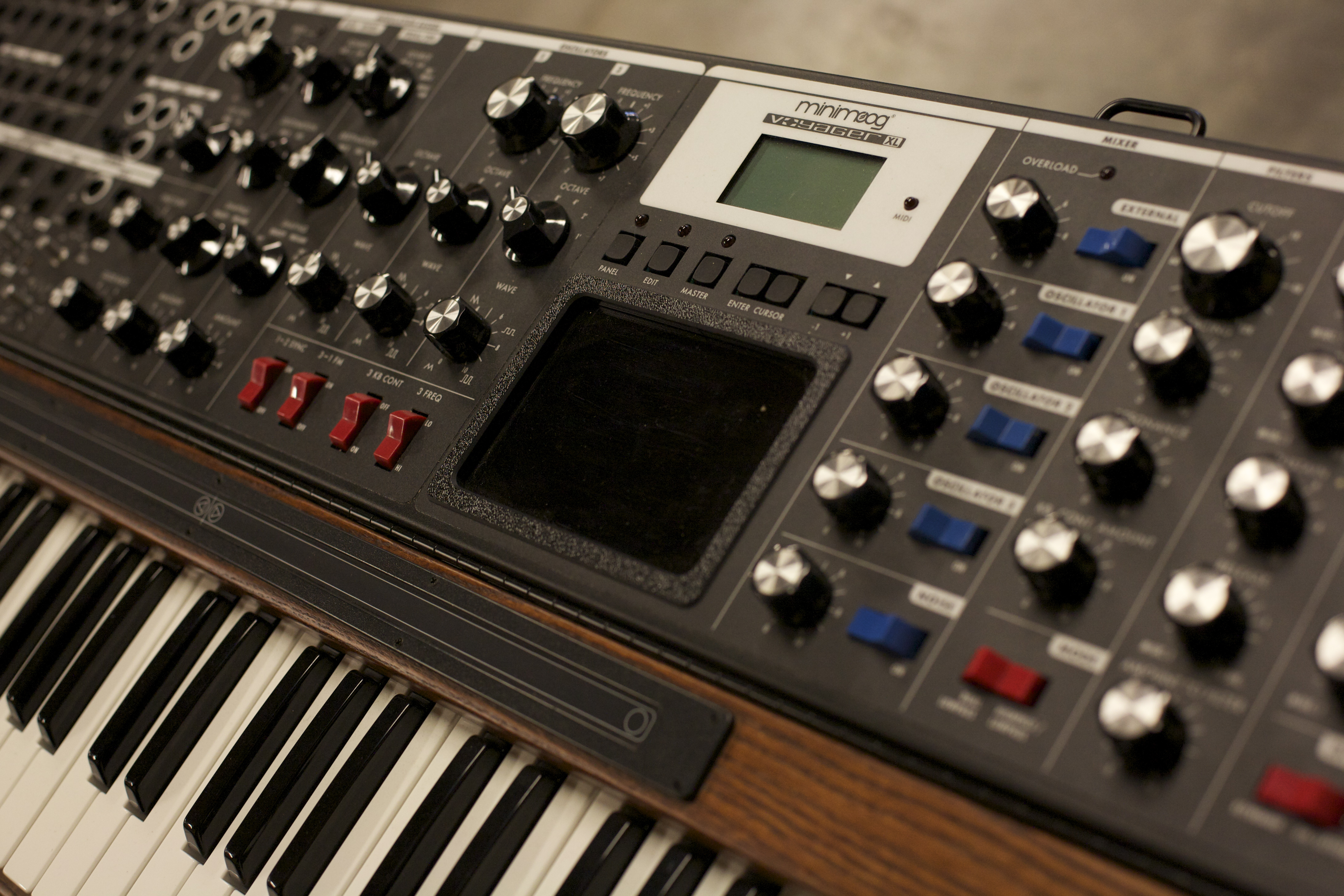
Minimoog Voyager XL, owned by Brian Eno

The English producer Brian Eno is credited with coining the term "ambient music" in the mid-1970s. He said other artists had been creating similar music, but that "I just gave it a name. Which is exactly what it needed ... By naming something you create a difference. You say that this is now real. Names are very important." He used the term to describe music that is different from forms of canned music like Muzak.

In the liner notes for his 1978 album Ambient 1: Music for Airports, Eno wrote:

Whereas the extant canned music companies proceed from the basis of regularizing environments by blanketing their acoustic and atmospheric idiosyncrasies, Ambient Music is intended to enhance these. Whereas conventional background music is produced by stripping away all sense of doubt and uncertainty (and thus all genuine interest) from the music, Ambient Music retains these qualities. And whereas their intention is to "brighten" the environment by adding stimulus to it (thus supposedly alleviating the tedium of routine tasks and leveling out the natural ups and downs of the body rhythms) Ambient Music is intended to induce calm and a space to think. Ambient Music must be able to accommodate many levels of listening attention without enforcing one in particular; it must be as ignorable as it is interesting.

Eno, who describes himself as a "non-musician", termed his experiments "treatments" rather than traditional performances. David Bowie created the Berlin Trilogy with Eno, both of whom were inspired during the production of the albums in the trilogy by German kosmische Musik bands and minimalist composers.

=== 1980s ===
In the late 70s, new-age musician Laraaji began busking in New York parks and sidewalks, including Washington Square Park. It was there that Brian Eno heard Laraaji playing and asked him if he would like to record an album. Day of Radiance released in 1980, was the third album in Eno's Ambient series. Although Laraaji had already recorded a number of albums, this one gave him international recognition. Unlike other albums in the series, Day of Radiance featured mostly acoustic instruments instead of electronics.

In the mid-1980s, the possibilities to create a sonic landscape increased through the use of sampling. By the late 1980s, there was a steep increase in the incorporation of the computer in the writing and recording process of records. The sixteen-bit Macintosh platform with built-in sound and comparable IBM models would find themselves in studios and homes of musicians and record makers. However, many artists were still working with analogue synthesizers and acoustic instruments to produce ambient works.

In 1983, Midori Takada recorded her first solo LP Through the Looking Glass in two days. She performed all parts on the album, with diverse instrumentation including percussion, marimba, gong, reed organ, bells, ocarina, vibraphone, piano and glass Coca-Cola bottles. Between 1988 and 1993, Éliane Radigue produced three hour-long works on the ARP 2500 which were subsequently issued together as La Trilogie De La Mort.

Also in 1988, founding member and director of the San Francisco Tape Music Centre, Pauline Oliveros coined the term "deep listening" after she recorded an album inside a huge underground cistern in Washington which has a 45-second reverberation time. The concept of Deep Listening then went on to become "an aesthetic based upon principles of improvisation, electronic music, ritual, teaching and meditation".

=== 1990s ===
By the early 1990s, artists such as the Orb, Aphex Twin, Seefeel, the Irresistible Force, Biosphere, and the Higher Intelligence Agency gained commercial success and were being referred to by the popular music press as ambient house, ambient techno, IDM or simply "ambient". The term chillout emerged from British ecstasy culture which was originally applied in relaxed downtempo "chillout rooms" outside of the main dance floor where ambient, dub and downtempo beats were played to ease the tripping mind.

British artists such as Aphex Twin (specifically: Selected Ambient Works Volume II, 1994), Global Communication (76:14, 1994), The Future Sound of London (Lifeforms, 1994, ISDN, 1994), the Black Dog (Temple of Transparent Balls, 1993), Autechre (Incunabula, 1993, Amber, 1994), Boards of Canada, and The KLF's Chill Out, (1990), all took a part in popularising and diversifying ambient music where it was used as a calming respite from the intensity of the hardcore and techno popular at that time. Other global ambient artists from the 1990s include American composers Stars of the Lid (who released 5 albums during this decade), and Japanese artist Susumu Yokota whose album Sakura (1999) featured what Pitchfork magazine called "dreamy, processed guitar as a distinctive sound tool".

=== 2000s ===
In the early 2000s, offshoots of trance music oriented around ambient music garnered popularity. Established in France in 2001, Ultimae has become the go-to label for space ambient, and they included artists such as Carbon Based Lifeforms. DJs in Ibiza's Café Del Mar began creating ambient house mixes that drew on jazz, classical, Hispanic, and New Age sources. Consequently, the popular understanding of "chill-out music" shifted away from "ambient" and into its own distinct genre. Producer Wolfgang Voigt co-runs the German label Kompakt, which has released installments of the influential ambient techno compilation series Pop Ambient annually since 2001.

In indie music, chillwave emerged, inspired by the atmosphere of dream pop. Atlas Sound debuted with the album Let the Blind Lead Those Who Can See but Cannot Feel, which featured ambient pieces. Animal Collective's Merriweather Post Pavilion was an album released in January 2009 that was particularly influential for its ambient sounds and repetitive melodies.

=== 2010s–present ===
==== YouTube ====
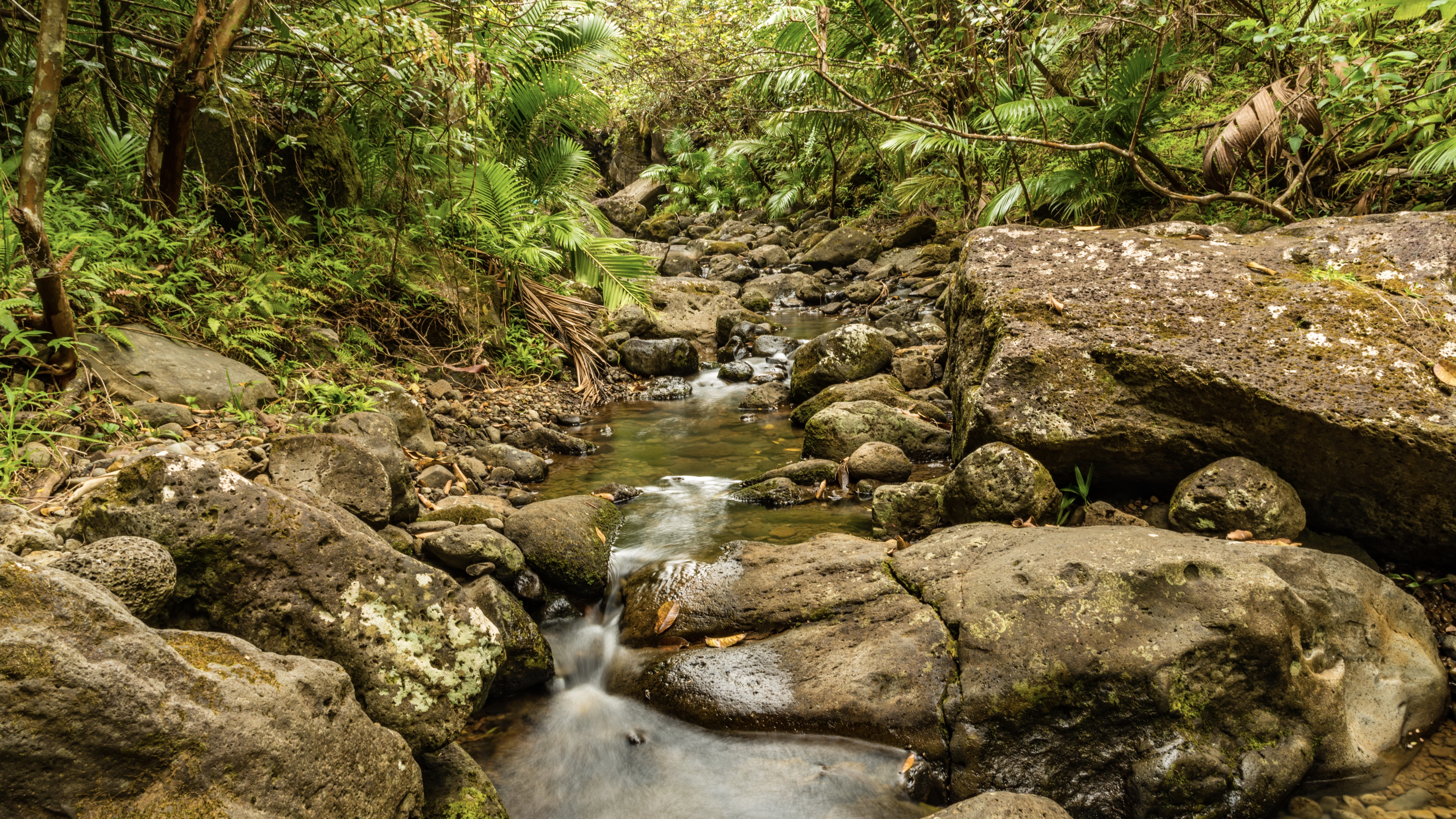
Rainforest scenery, illustrating the natural soundscapes, rainfall and flowing water used in ambient music

From the early 2010s to present, ambient music gained widespread recognition on YouTube, with uploaded pieces, usually ranging from one to eight hours long, getting over millions of hits. Ambient videos assist online listeners with yoga, study, sleep (see music and sleep), massage, meditation and gaining optimism, inspiration, and creating peaceful atmosphere in their rooms or other environments. Such videos may be titled "relaxing music".

Many uploaded ambient videos may also be influenced by biomusic where they feature sounds of nature, though the sounds would be modified with reverbs and delay units to make spacey versions of the sounds as part of the ambience. Such natural sounds oftentimes include those of a beach, rainforest, thunderstorm and rainfall, among others, with vocalizations of animals such as bird songs being used as well. Pieces containing binaural beats are common and popular uploads as well, which provide music therapy and stress management for the listener. (Note: One notable exception is the Caretaker's Everywhere at the End of Time, an ambient series of albums featuring over 22 millions views as of 11 November 2026. It is widely considered to evoke strong negative emotions due to its musical representation of Alzheimer's disease.)

==== Digital releases ====
iTunes and Spotify have digital radio stations that feature ambient music, which are mostly produced by independent labels.

Acclaimed ambient music of this era (according to Pitchfork magazine) include works by Max Richter, Julianna Barwick, Grouper, William Basinski, Oneohtrix Point Never, and the Caretaker. In 2011, American composer Liz Harris recording as Grouper released the album AIA: Alien Observer, listed by Pitchfork at number 21 on their "50 Best Ambient Albums of All Time". In 2011, Julianna Barwick released her first full-length album The Magic Place. Heavily influenced by her childhood experiences in a church choir, Barwick loops her wordless vocals into ethereal soundscapes. It was listed at number 30 on Pitchfork's 50 Best Ambient Albums of All Time. After several self-released albums, Buchla composer, producer and performer Kaitlyn Aurelia Smith was signed to independent record label Western Vinyl in 2015.

LA1
The first track of Long Ambients 1: Calm. Sleep. by Moby

In 2016, she released her second official album EARS. It paired the Buchla synthesizer with traditional instruments and her compositions were compared to Laurie Spiegel and Alice Coltrane. Kaitlyn has also collaborated with other well-known Buchla performer, Suzanne Ciani. Long Ambients 1: Calm. Sleep. was released by American electronica musician Moby in 2016, as a free download. In March 2019, Moby released a follow-up ambient album, Long Ambients 2. Iggy Pop's 2019 album Free features ambient soundscapes. Mallsoft, a subgenre of vaporwave, features various ambient influences, with artists such as Cat System Corp. and Groceries exploring ambient sounds typical of malls and grocery stores. In 2019, Canadian composer Kyle Bobby Dunn released the 3 hour From Here To Eternity album. It was praised by Exclaim! magazine who wrote: "Dunn's ability to subsume the subject into his detailed sonic landscapes with minor shifts in the onslaught of drones speaks to this album's ability to impact a wide-ranging listenership. From Here to Eternity serves as a masterful articulation of the power of ambient music."

== Related and derivative genres ==
=== Ambient house ===
Ambient house is a musical category founded in the late 1980s that is used to describe acid house featuring ambient music elements and atmospheres. Tracks in the ambient house genre typically feature four-on-the-floor beats, synth pads, and vocal samples integrated in an atmospheric style.

Ambient house tracks generally lack a diatonic center and feature much atonality along with synthesized chords. The Dutch Brainvoyager is an example of this genre. Illbient is another form of ambient house music.

=== Ambient pop ===
Ambient pop is a style of indie music that emerged in the 1990s. It incorporates structures that are common to post-rock in the first wave, indie pop, and indie rock, but can feature "electronic textures and atmospheres" with hypnotic and meditative aspects. It has drawn from psychedelic music and the repetitive traits of minimalism, krautrock and techno as prevalent influences. Examples of music deemed ambient pop are the output of Darla Records' Bliss Out series, particularly one of its contributing bands, the American Analog Set, Stereolab, Laika, and Broadcast.

Dream pop band Slowdive's 1995 album Pygmalion was a major departure from the band's usual sound, heavily incorporating elements of ambient electronica and psychedelia with hypnotic, repetitive structures, influencing many bands falling under ambient pop; Pitchfork critic Nitsuh Abebe described the album's songs as "ambient pop dreams that have more in common with [first wave] post-rock [bands] like Disco Inferno than shoegazers like Ride".

=== Ambient techno ===
Ambient techno is a style that emerged in the 1990s. The term is used to describe the use of ambient atmospheres with the rhythmic and melodic elements of techno. Artists include Aphex Twin, Carl Craig, the Orb, the Future Sound of London, the Black Dog, Pete Namlook and Biosphere.

=== Dark ambient ===
Dark ambient is a style that originally emerged in the mid-1980s and continued throughout the 1990s and 2000s. It draws primary influence from both industrial and ambient music, and is characterized by ominous, dark drones, discordant overtones and a gloomy, monumental or catacomb-inspired atmosphere. Although mostly an electronic genre, artists frequently perform on or sample traditional instruments and make use of semi-acoustic recording procedures.

The term was coined in the early 1990s by Roger Karmanik of Brighter Death Now to describe the music of Raison d'être and related artists that were associated with the Cold Meat Industry record label. Projects like Lustmord, Nocturnal Emissions, Lab Report, and Zoviet France were some of the earliest artists to create consistently dark ambient music. These artists make use of industrial principles such as noise and shock tactics, but wield these elements with more subtlety. Additionally, it often has strong occultist tendencies with a particular leaning toward magick as expounded by Aleister Crowley, and chaos magic, often giving the music a ritualistic flavor.

=== Drone music ===
Drone music is a minimalist genre of music that emphasizes the use of sustained sounds, notes, or tone clusters called drones. It is typically characterized by lengthy compositions featuring relatively slight harmonic variations. La Monte Young, one of its 1960s originators, defined it in 2000 as "the sustained tone branch of minimalism." Elements of drone music have been incorporated in diverse genres such as rock, ambient, and electronic music.

=== New-age music ===
Ambient music fused with new-age music styles has an explicit purpose of aiding meditation and relaxation, or aiding and enabling various alternative spiritual practices, such as alternative healing, yoga practice, guided meditation, or chakra auditing. The proponents of new age-ambient music are almost always musicians who create their music expressly for these purposes. To be useful for meditation, the music must have repetitive dynamic and texture without sudden loud chords or improvisation, which could disturb the meditator. It is minimalist in conception, and musicians in the genre are mostly instrumentalists rather than vocalists.

The use of instruments along with sounds of animals (like whales, wolves and eagles) and nature (waterfalls, ocean waves, rain) is popular in new-age music. Flautist Dean Evenson was one of the first musicians to combine peaceful music with the sounds of nature, launching a genre that became popular for massage and yoga.

=== Space music ===
"Interstellar", by Tamaki Tso
Example of a self-described ambient music song fused with experimental and post rock elements

Space music, also spelled "Spacemusic", includes music from the ambient genre as well as a broad range of other genres with certain characteristics in common to create the experience of contemplative spaciousness.

Space music ranges from simple to complex sonic textures sometimes lacking conventional melodic, rhythmic, or vocal components, generally evoking a sense of "continuum of spatial imagery and emotion", beneficial introspection, deep listening and sensations of floating, cruising or flying.

Space music is used by individuals for both background enhancement and foreground listening, often with headphones, to stimulate relaxation, contemplation, inspiration and generally peaceful expansive moods and soundscapes. Space music is also a component of many film soundtracks and is commonly used in planetariums, as a relaxation aid and for meditation.

== Sleep ==
Ambient has been selected by participants from online sleep surveys to aid sleep. The ambient music genre, among other genres, was used in a study pertaining to insomnia in adults, where it facilitated a large improvement in sleep quality for insomnia patients. Participants, who were between 20 and 45 years old, listened to Max Richter's album Sleep, which was originally meant to work as a sleep aid. They used headphones and were able to shut their eyes, but they were instructed to stay in a sitting position so they do not fall asleep. Despite this, one participant fell asleep while listening to the music.

== Film soundtracks ==
Examples of films with soundtracks that feature some, or extensive, usage of ambient music include, Forbidden Planet (1956), Solaris (1972), Blade Runner (1982), Dune (1984), Heathers (1988), Akira (1988), Titanic (1997), The Virgin Suicides (1999), Traffic (2000), Donnie Darko (2001), Solaris (2002), The Passion of the Christ (2004), Pride & Prejudice (2005), The Social Network (2010), Her (2013), Enemy (2013), Drive (2011), Interstellar (2014), Gone Girl (2014), The Revenant (2015), Columbus (2017), Mandy (2018), Annihilation (2018), Ad Astra (2019), Chernobyl (2019) and Dune (2021), among many others.

== Notable ambient-music shows ==
- Sirius XM Chill plays ambient, chillout and downtempo electronica.
- Sirius XM Spa blends ambient and new age instrumental music on channel XM 68.
- Echoes, a daily two-hour music radio program hosted by John Diliberto featuring a soundscape of ambient, spacemusic, electronica, new acoustic and new music directions – founded in 1989 and syndicated on 130 radio stations in the US.
- BBC Radio 1 Relax was a radio station offered by the British Broadcasting Corporation (BBC) that broadcast ambient music. The channel featured a variety of ambient genres, including electronic and instrumental compositions.
- Hearts of Space, a program hosted by Stephen Hill and broadcast on NPR in the US since 1973.
- Musical Starstreams, a US-based commercial radio station and Internet program produced, programmed and hosted by Forest since 1981.
- Star's End, a radio show on 88.5 WXPN, in Philadelphia, Pennsylvania. Founded in 1976, it is the second longest-running ambient music radio show in the world.
- Ultima Thule Ambient Music, a weekly 90-minute show broadcast since 1989 on community radio across Australia.
- Avaruusromua, the name meaning "space debris", is a 60-minute ambient and avant-garde radio program broadcast since 1990 on Finnish public broadcaster YLE's various stations.

== See also ==
- Ambient video – Video genre emphasizing atmosphere over storytelling
- Balearic beat – Subgenre of house music
- Easy listening – Popular music genre
- Frippertronics – Recording techniques used by Robert Fripp
- Furniture music – Music genre
- Incidental music – Musical composition for a play
- List of ambient artists
- List of electronic music genres
- Mallsoft – Microgenre of music
- Microsound – Sound synthesis method involving samples shorter than 0.1 seconds
- Minimalist music – Music using limited or minimal materials
- Music and sleep – Listening of music to improve sleep quality
- Ocean of Sound – 1995 book and 1996 album by David Toop
- Onkyokei – Music genre
- Postminimalism – Art movement influenced by the aesthetic of minimalism
- Reductionism (music) – Improvised music genre
- Space age pop – Music genre
- Sound map – Digital geographical maps
