= David Young (poet) =

American poet (1936–2025)

David Pollock Young (December 14, 1936 – May 3, 2025) was an American poet, translator, editor, literary critic and academic. His work includes 11 volumes of poetry, translations from Italian, Chinese, German, Czech, Dutch, and Spanish, critical work on Shakespeare, Yeats, and modernist poets, and landmark anthologies of prose poetry and magical realism. He co-founded and edited the magazine FIELD: Contemporary Poetry and Poetics for its 50 years of publication. Young was Longman Professor Emeritus of English at Oberlin College, and was the recipient of awards including NEA and Guggenheim fellowships.

== Early life ==
Young was born on December 14, 1936, in Davenport, Iowa, and grew up in Minneapolis and Omaha, where he graduated from Central High School in 1954. He completed a BA at Carleton College (1958), and an MA (1961) and PhD (1965) at Yale University.

== Teaching career ==
Young taught English Renaissance literature, modern poetry, and creative writing at Oberlin College from 1961 to 2003, and was named Donald R. Longman Professor of English and Creative Writing in 1986. His students included Pulitzer Prize recipients Franz Wright (2004) and Vijay Seshadri (2014)

== Personal life and death ==
Young married Chloe Hamilton in 1963. They had two children, Newell Young and the poet Margaret Young. In 1988, after Chloe Young's death from cancer in 1985, Young married Georgia Newman, a physician. They lived in Oberlin, Ohio.

Young died of Parkinson's disease on May 3, 2025, at the age of 88.

== Works ==
David Young was one of eight poets featured in Al Lee’s anthology The Major Young Poets, published in 1971. His 11 volumes of poetry and a book of prose poems reflect a career of more than 50 years. His poetry is generally felt to be deeply grounded in the landscape and weather of the American Midwest. Young's critical works include studies of Shakespeare, Yeats, and modernism.

Young also translated widely, from Italian (Petrarch and Montale), Chinese (Wang Wei, Li Po, Tu Fu, Li Ho, Li Shang-yin, Yu Xuanji, Du Mu, Qin Guan, Su Dongpo), Japanese (Bashō), Dutch (Vasalis), German (Rilke, Eich, Celan), Czech (Holub), and Spanish (Neruda).

=== FIELD Magazine and other editorial work ===
In 1969, Young and five Oberlin colleagues founded the magazine FIELD: Contemporary Poetry and Poetics. Published twice annually for 50 years, FIELD featured the poetry of hundreds of writers, both celebrated and emerging, including Charles Wright, Sandra McPherson, Mark Strand, Adrienne Rich, Jean Valentine, Charles Simic, Philip Levine, William Stafford, Thomas Lux, Arthur Sze, Carol Potter, and Bob Hicok.

Under Young's editorial leadership, Oberlin College Press expanded in 1978 to publish books of translation in the FIELD Translation Series, including volumes by Anna Akhmatova, Vasko Popa, Yannis Ritsos, Max Jacob, and Dino Campana, and then in 1993 to publish contemporary poets in the FIELD Poetry Series, including Marianne Boruch, Russell Edson, Angie Estes, Jon Loomis, and Dennis Schmitz.

Young advanced interest in the prose poem and in magical realism with two anthologies. Models of the Universe: An Anthology of the Prose Poem (1995, co-edited with Stuart Friebert), featured prose poets such as Rimbaud, Kafka, Toomer, and the father of the prose poem, Aloysius Bertrand. Magical Realist Fiction: An Anthology (1984, co-edited with Keith Hollaman) included writers from Gogol to Borges to Kundera. He also co-edited (with Stuart Friebert and David Walker) A FIELD Guide to Contemporary Poetry and Poetics, and (with Stuart Friebert) The Longman Anthology of Contemporary American Poetry.

== Awards ==
- 1967–68: National Endowment for the Humanities Junior Fellowship
- 1968: United States Award of the International Poetry Forum
- 1978: Ohio Arts Council Award
- 1978–79: Guggenheim Fellowship in Poetry
- 1981: Huntington Library Fellowship
- 1981–82: National Endowment for the Arts Fellowship in Poetry
- 1982, 2008: Ohioana Award for Editorial Excellence
- 1988: Ohioana Poetry Award
- 1990: Ohio Major Artist Award, Ohio Arts Council
- 1994: Ohio State University/The Journal Award in Poetry
- 1999: Cleveland Arts Prize for Literature
- 2001: Bogliasco Foundation Fellowship
- 2002: Witter Bynner Translation Residency, Santa Fe Art Institute
- 2002: Pushcart Prize
- 2011: Ohioana Book Award in Poetry
- 2018: Distinguished Achievement Award, Carleton College Alumni Association

== Bibliography ==
Young's work includes poetry, nonfiction, translations, and criticism.

=== Poetry ===
- Sweating Out the Winter, University of Pittsburgh Press, 1969.
- Boxcars, Ecco Press, 1973.
- Work Lights: Thirty-Two Prose Poems, Cleveland State Poetry Center, 1977.
- The Names of a Hare in English, University of Pittsburgh Press, 1979.
- Foraging, Wesleyan University Press, 1986.
- Earthshine, Wesleyan University Press, 1988.
- The Planet on the Desk: Selected and New Poems 1960-1990, Wesleyan University Press, 1991.
- Night Thoughts and Henry Vaughan, Ohio State University Press, 1994.
- At the White Window, Ohio State University Press, 2000.
- Black Lab, Alfred A. Knopf, 2006.
- Field of Light and Shadow, Alfred A. Knopf, 2010, 2023.

=== Nonfiction ===
- Seasoning: A Poet’s Year, with Seasonal Recipes, Ohio State University Press, 1999.

=== Translations ===
- Rainer Maria Rilke, Duino Elegies: A New Translation, W.W. Norton, 1978.
- Günter Eich, Valuable Nail: Selected Poems, Oberlin College Press, 1981, with Stuart Friebert and David Walker.
- Miroslav Holub, Interferon, or On Theater, Oberlin College Press, 1982, with Dana Hábová.
- Rainer Maria Rilke, Sonnets to Orpheus, Wesleyan University Press, 1987.
- Pablo Neruda, The Heights of Macchu Picchu, Stephen F. Austin State University Press, 1987, 2015.
- Miroslav Holub, Vanishing Lung Syndrome, Oberlin College Press, 1990, with Dana Hábová.
- Miroslav Holub, The Dimension of the Present Moment: Essays, Faber & Faber, 1990.
- Wang Wei, Li Po, Tu Fu, Li Ho, Li Shang-Yin, Five T’ang Poets, Oberlin College Press, 1990.
- The Book of Fresh Beginnings: Selected Poems of Rainer Maria Rilke, Oberlin College Press, 1994.
- Miroslav Holub, Intensive Care: Selected and New Poems, Oberlin College Press, 1996, with others.
- Miroslav Holub, Shedding Life: Disease, Politics, and Other Human Conditions, Milkweed Editions, 1997.
- The Clouds Float North: The Complete Poems of Yu Xuanji, Wesleyan University Press, 1998, with Jiann I. Lin.
- The Poetry of Petrarch, Farrar, Straus, & Giroux, 2004.
- Eugenio Montale, Selected Poems, Oberlin College Press, 2004, with Jonathan Galassi and Charles Wright.
- Out on the Autumn River: Selected Poems of Du Mu, Rager Media, 2007, with Jiann I. Lin.
- Du Fu: A Life in Poetry, Alfred A. Knopf, 2008.
- Paul Celan, From Threshold to Threshold, Marick Press, 2010.
- Paul Celan, Language Behind Bars, Marick Press, 2012.
- Moon Woke Me Up Nine Times: Selected Haiku of Bashō, Alfred A. Knopf, 2013.
- Paul Celan, No One’s Rose, Marick Press, 2014.
- Qin Guan, Moon as Bright as Water, Createspace Independent Pub, 2017, with William McNaughton.
- The Old Coastline: Selected Poems of M. Vasalis, Pinyon Publishing, 2019, with Fred Lessing.
- Listening All Night to the Rain: Selected Poems of Su Dongpo, Pinyon Publishing, 2020, with Jiann I. Lin.

=== Literary criticism ===
- Something of Great Constancy: The Art of "A Midsummer Night’s Dream", Yale University Press, 1966.
- The Heart’s Forest: A Study of Shakespeare’s Pastoral Plays, Yale University Press, 1972.
- Troubled Mirror: A Study of Yeats’s "The Tower", University of Iowa Press, 1987.
- The Action to the Word: Structure and Style in Shakespearean Tragedy, Yale University Press, 1990.
- Six Modernist Moments in Poetry, University of Iowa Press, 2006.
- Imagining Shakespeare’s "Pericles": A Story about the Creative Process, New Publisher, 2011.
- The King’s a Beggar: A Study of Shakespeare’s Epilogues, Archway, 2017.

=== Edited collections and anthologies ===
- Twentieth Century Interpretations of "Henry IV, Part 2": A Collection of Critical Essays, Prentice-Hall, 1968.
- A FIELD Guide to Contemporary Poetry and Poetics, Oberlin College Press, 1980, revised 1997, with Stuart Friebert and David Walker.
- The Longman Anthology of Contemporary American Poetry, Longman, 1983, revised 1989, with Stuart Friebert.
- Magical Realist Fiction: An Anthology, Oberlin College Press, 1984, with Keith Hollaman.
- Shakespeare’s Middle Tragedies: A Collection of Critical Essays, Pearson, 1993.
- Models of the Universe: An Anthology of the Prose Poem, Oberlin College Press, 1995, with Stuart Friebert.
