= List of Guggenheim Fellowships awarded in 1978 =

Two hundred and ninety-two scholars, artists, and scientists received Guggenheim Fellowships in 1978. $4,569,500 was disbursed between the recipients, who were chosen from an applicant pool of 3,073. University of California, Berkeley had the most winners on its faculty (16), followed by Yale University (11) and Stanford University (9). The University of California system had 42 fellowships total among its faculty.

== 1978 United States and Canada Fellows ==
Category	Field of Study	Fellow	Institutional association	Research topic	Notes	Ref
Creative Arts	Choreography	Senta Driver	HARRY Dance Company			
Creative Arts	Choreography	Moses Pendleton	Pilobolus			
Creative Arts	Choreography	Kei Takei			Also won in 1988	
Creative Arts	Drama & Performance Art	Barbara Garson		Playwriting		
Creative Arts	Drama & Performance Art	William Hauptman		Playwriting		
Creative Arts	Drama & Performance Art	Leonard Melfi		Playwriting		
Creative Arts	Drama & Performance Art	Wallace Shawn		Playwriting		
Creative Arts	Fiction	Alice Adams		Writing		
Creative Arts	Fiction	Jonathan Baumbach	Brooklyn College	Writing		
Creative Arts	Fiction	Raymond Carver	Goddard College	Writing		
Creative Arts	Fiction	Thomas D. Farber		Writing		
Creative Arts	Fiction	Andrew Fetler	University of Massachusetts Amherst	Writing		
Creative Arts	Fiction	Bette Howland		Writing		
Creative Arts	Fiction	Bharati Mukherjee	McGill University	Writing		
Creative Arts	Fiction	Darcy O'Brien	Pomona College and Claremont Graduate School	Writing		
Creative Arts	Film	Ralph Arlyck	Vassar College	Filmmaking		
Creative Arts	Film	Robert Breer	Cooper Union	Filmmaking		
Creative Arts	Film	Ed Emshwiller	TV Lab at Thirteen/WNET (in residence)	Filmmaking	Also won in 1973	
Creative Arts	Film	Steven Fischler	Pacific Street Films	Filmmaking	In collaboration with Joel Sucher	
Creative Arts	Film	Richard W. Kotuk	New School for Social Research	Filmmaking		
Creative Arts	Film	Joel Sucher	Pacific Street Films	Filmmaking	In collaboration with Steven Fischler	
Creative Arts	Fine Art	Charles A. Bennett III		Painting		
Creative Arts	Fine Art	Steven J. Beyer		Sculpture		
Creative Arts	Fine Art	Chris Burden	UCLA	Conceptual art		
Creative Arts	Fine Art	Calvert Coggeshall		Painting		
Creative Arts	Fine Art	Claire Falkenstein		Sculpture		
Creative Arts	Fine Art	Michael Foran		Painting		
Creative Arts	Fine Art	Edwin J. Gunn		Painting		
Creative Arts	Fine Art	Nancy Holt		Sculpture		
Creative Arts	Fine Art	Neil Jenney		Painting		
Creative Arts	Fine Art	Richard Kevorkian	Virginia Commonwealth University	Painting		
Creative Arts	Fine Art	Brenda Miller		Sculpture		
Creative Arts	Fine Art	Kenneth Price		Sculpture		
Creative Arts	Fine Art	Julius Tobias	University of North Carolina at Greensboro (visiting)	Sculpture	Also won in 1972	
Creative Arts	Fine Art	Thornton Willis		Painting		
Creative Arts	Fine Art	Jacqueline Winsor	School of Visual Arts	Sculpture		
Creative Arts	Music Composition	Stephen Albert		Composing	Also won in 1968	
Creative Arts	Music Composition	Theodore Antoniou	Philadelphia College of the Performing Arts	Composing		
Creative Arts	Music Composition	C. Curtis-Smith	Western Michigan University	Composing		
Creative Arts	Music Composition	John Heiss	New England Conservatory of Music	Composing		
Creative Arts	Music Composition	Joseph A. Hudson		Composing		
Creative Arts	Music Composition	Charles Israels	Bard College (visiting)	Composing		
Creative Arts	Music Composition	David Kechley	Case Western Reserve University and Cleveland Institute of Music	Composing		
Creative Arts	Music Composition	Charles Mingus		Composing	Also won in 1971	
Creative Arts	Music Composition	Conlon Nancarrow		Composing		
Creative Arts	Music Composition	David Olan	Columbia University	Composing		
Creative Arts	Music Composition	Steve Reich		Composing		
Creative Arts	Music Composition	Ned Rorem		Composing	Also won in 1957	
Creative Arts	Music Composition	Joseph Schwantner	Eastman School of Music	Composing		
Creative Arts	Music Composition	Elie Siegmeister	Hofstra University	Composing		
Creative Arts	Photography	Richard M. A. Benson	Yale University	Photography and research on photographic hand ink printing	Also won in 1986	
Creative Arts	Photography	Bill Burke	School of the Museum of Fine Arts at Tufts			
Creative Arts	Photography	Judy Dater				
Creative Arts	Photography	Jan Groover	Kingsborough Community College			
Creative Arts	Photography	Benjamin M. Lifson	Village Voice			
Creative Arts	Photography	Danny Lyon			Also won in 1969	
Creative Arts	Photography	Joel Meyerowitz	Cooper Union		Also won in 1970	
Creative Arts	Photography	Richard Misrach	UC Berkeley			
Creative Arts	Photography	Walter Rosenblum	Brooklyn College	"People of the South Bronx"		
Creative Arts	Photography	Joel Sternfeld	Stockton State College	American life through color photography	Also won in 1982	
Creative Arts	Photography	Henry Wessel	San Francisco Art Institute		Also won in 1971	
Creative Arts	Photography	Geoffrey L. Winningham	Rice University	High school football in Texas	Also won in 1972	
Creative Arts	Photography	Garry Winogrand	University of Texas at Austin	Southwest United States	Also won in 1964 and 1969	
Creative Arts	Poetry	Elizabeth Bishop	Brandeis University	Writing	Also won in 1947	
Creative Arts	Poetry	Clayton Eshleman	Manual Arts High School	Writing		
Creative Arts	Poetry	Carolyn Forché	San Diego State University	Writing		
Creative Arts	Poetry	Tess Gallagher	University of Montana (in residence)	Writing		
Creative Arts	Poetry	John N. Morris	Washington University in St. Louis	Writing		
Creative Arts	Poetry	Dennis Schmitz	Sacramento State University (in residence)	Writing		
Creative Arts	Poetry	Ellen Bryant Voigt	Goddard College	Writing		
Creative Arts	Poetry	James Wright	Hunter College	Writing	Also won in 1964	
Creative Arts	Poetry	David Young	Oberlin College	Writing		
Creative Arts	Video & Audio	Tom DeWitt	SUNY at Albany	Development of the Pantograph		
Creative Arts	Video & Audio	Frank Gillette				
Creative Arts	Video & Audio	Daniel J. Sandin	University of Illinois			
Humanities	American Literature	Houston A. Baker Jr.	University of Pennsylvania	The Black narrative text and the anthropology of art		
Humanities	American Literature	Annette Kolodny	University of New Hampshire			
Humanities	American Literature	Richard D. Lehan	UCLA	The idea of city in modern American literature		
Humanities	American Literature	Kermit Vanderbilt	San Diego State University	Book titled The Study of American Literature: The Movement, the Scholarship, the People		
Humanities	American Literature	William Veeder	University of Chicago	Gothic fiction in England and America		
Humanities	Architecture, Planning & Design	Gordon Ashby		Natural light in museum and gallery interiors		
Humanities	Architecture, Planning & Design	John Margolies		Commercial architecture of the 20th century		
Humanities	Biography	Edgar M. Branch	Miami University	James T. Farrell		
Humanities	Biography	John Gerassi	Queens College CUNY	Jean-Paul Sartre		
Humanities	British History	Lynn Hollen Lees	University of Pennsylvania	Culture and community in English manufacturing towns, 1780-1910		
Humanities	British History	Trevor Lloyd	University of Toronto			
Humanities	Classics	Vincent J. Bruno	University of Texas at Arlington	Painting techniques of Hellenistic and early Roman artists		
Humanities	Classics	John B. Van Sickle	Brooklyn College and CUNY Graduate School	Propertius		
Humanities	Dance Research	David Vaughan	Cunningham Dance Foundation	Choreography of Merce Cunningham		
Humanities	East Asian Studies	David N. Keightley	UC Berkeley	The diviner's world		
Humanities	East Asian Studies	Jeffrey P. Mass	Stanford University	Lordship and inheritance in early medieval Japan, 1180-1333		
Humanities	Economic History	Paul Uselding	University of Illinois	Research at Harvard University		
Humanities	Economic History	Jan de Vries	UC Berkeley	Behavior of the Dutch labor market, 1580-1850		
Humanities	English Literature	Robert B. Alter	UC Berkeley	Stendhal	Also won in 1966	
Humanities	English Literature	Ruth apRoberts	UC Riverside			
Humanities	English Literature	Patrick M. Brantlinger	Indiana University	Origins of the concept of mass culture		
Humanities	English Literature	Thomas Clayton	University of Minnesota	Shakespearean tragedy		
Humanities	English Literature	Robert A. Colby	Queens College CUNY	Rise and decline of the novel with a purpose		
Humanities	English Literature	Margaret Anne Doody	UC Berkeley	Fanny Burney's novels		
Humanities	English Literature	John Halperin	University of Southern California	George Gissing	Also won in 1985	
Humanities	English Literature	Daniel A. Harris	University of Colorado Boulder			
Humanities	English Literature	George K. Hunter	Yale University	Theatrical structures of Elizabethan play		
Humanities	English Literature	David Krause	Brown University			
Humanities	English Literature	George P. Landow	Brown University	Typological symbolism in Victorian art, literature, and thought	Also won in 1973	
Humanities	English Literature	Richard L. Levin	SUNY at Stony Brook	Contemporary perceptions of English Renaissance drama		
Humanities	English Literature	Jeffrey Meyers	University of Colorado Boulder	Wyndham Lewis		
Humanities	English Literature	Charles L. Ross	University of Virginia	Critical biography of D. H. Lawrence		
Humanities	English Literature	John M. Steadman, III	Huntington Library and UC Riverside	Introduction to the variorum commentary on Paradise Lost		
Humanities	English Literature	J. P. Wearing	University of Arizona	Calendar of plays and players of the London stage, 1900-1909		
Humanities	Film, Video, & Radio Studies	Manny Farber	UC San Diego	Munich school of film making, 1967-1977	Also won in 1967	
Humanities	Fine Arts Research	E. A. Carmean Jr.	National Gallery of Art	Late Cubist paintings, 1915-1928		
Humanities	Fine Arts Research	Nicolai Cikovsky Jr.	University of New Mexico	Winslow Homer's art		
Humanities	Fine Arts Research	Henri Dorra	UC Santa Barbara	Work on his book Symbolist Art Theories		
Humanities	Fine Arts Research	Walter S. Gibson	Case Western Reserve University	Origins and development of the Flemish cosmic landscape of the 16th century		
Humanities	Fine Arts Research	William McAllister-Johnson	University of Toronto	Critical repertory of graphics at the French Salon, 1673-1824		
Humanities	Fine Arts Research	Seymour Slive	Harvard University	Catalogue raisonné of Jacob van Ruisdael's paintings, drawings, and etchings	Also won in 1956	
Humanities	Fine Arts Research	Calvin Tomkins	The New Yorker	Robert Rauschenberg and the New York art world, 1945-1975		
Humanities	Fine Arts Research	Joanna G. Williams	UC Berkeley	Orissan paintings		
Humanities	Folklore & Popular Culture	Charles M. H. Keil	SUNY Buffalo	Ethnomusicology		
Humanities	French History	Keith M. Baker	University of Chicago	Ideological origins of the French Revolution		
Humanities	French Literature	Micheline L. Braun	Hunter College and Graduate Center, City University of New York	Crisis of personality in French literature, 1890-1970		
Humanities	French Literature	Jean Gaudon	Yale University	Poetry of Victor Hugo		
Humanities	French Literature	Frederic R. Jameson	Yale University		Also won in 1969	
Humanities	French Literature	Claude Pichois	Vanderbilt University			
Humanities	General Nonfiction	Jervis B. Anderson	The New Yorker	Cultural portrait of Harlem, 1900-1960		
Humanities	General Nonfiction	Thurston Clarke		Narrative account of the King David Hotel bombing		
Humanities	General Nonfiction	Jonathan Cott		Children's literature in a societal and cultural context		
Humanities	General Nonfiction	J. Anthony Lukas				
Humanities	General Nonfiction	Donald Phelps		Critical biography of Billy de Berk		
Humanities	German & East European History	Peter Hanns Reill	UCLA	Historical conceptions of Niebuhr and Humboldt in the context of early 19th-century German social and scientific thought		
Humanities	German & Scandinavian Literature	Herbert Lehnert	UC Irvine			
Humanities	German & Scandinavian Literature	Phillip M. Mitchell	University of Illinois			
Humanities	History of Science & Technology	Henry Guerlac	Cornell University	Critical and variorium edition of Isaac Newton's Opticks		
Humanities	History of Science & Technology	Cyril Stanley Smith			Also won in 1955	
Humanities	Italian Literature	Clara M. Lovett	Baruch College	Democratic movement in Italy, 1830-1876		
Humanities	Latin American Literature	Jaime Concha	University of Washington			
Humanities	Linguistics	S.-Y. Kuroda	UC San Diego	Studies toward an integrated theory of language		
Humanities	Linguistics	Ronald W. Langacker	UC San Diego	Formulation of an integrated theory of language structure		
Humanities	Linguistics	James A. Matisoff	UC Berkeley	Languages of mainland Southeast Asia		
Humanities	Linguistics	Roy A. Miller	University of Washington			
Humanities	Linguistics	William S-Y. Wang	UC Berkeley	Biological mechanisms associated with language		
Humanities	Literary Criticism	Elizabeth W. Bruss	Amherst College	Work on her book Beautiful Theories		
Humanities	Literary Criticism	Michael McCanles	Marquette University	Dialectical structures of The Prince and Arcadia		
Humanities	Literary Criticism	Garrett Stewart	UC Santa Barbara	Changing use of death scenes and symbolism in British fiction from the Victorian through the modern novel		
Humanities	Literary Criticism	James M. Wells	Newberry Library	American printing, 1776-1976		
Humanities	Literary Criticism	Joseph A. Wittreich	University of Maryland, College Park	Prophetic tradition in English poetry from the Renaissance through the Romantics		
Humanities	Medieval History	Robert Brentano	UC Berkeley	Church and religion in the city and Diocese of Rieti, 1200-1370	Also won in 1965	
Humanities	Medieval History	Angeliki E. Laiou	Rutgers College	Impact of Italian merchant capital upon the Eastern Mediterranean region	Also won in 1971	
Humanities	Medieval Literature	Barbara Nolan	Washington University in St. Louis	Evolution of the romance tradition from Geoffrey of Monmouth to Sir Thomas Malory		
Humanities	Music Research	A. Peter Brown	Indiana University	Haydn's keyboard music		
Humanities	Music Research	Donald F. Buchla		Interactive performance-oriented computer music languages		
Humanities	Music Research	Robert W. Gutman	Fashion Institute of Technology	Critical biography of Mozart		
Humanities	Music Research	Daniel Heartz	UC Berkeley	History of European music, 1725-1800	Also won in 1967	
Humanities	Music Research	Joel Sachs	Brooklyn College	Royal Philharmonic Society, 1813-1862		
Humanities	Near Eastern Studies	James D. Muhly	University of Pennsylvania	Beginnings of metallurgy in the ancient world		
Humanities	Philosophy	George T. Dickie	University of Illinois at Chicago Circle	Institutional theory of art		
Humanities	Philosophy	Kit Fine	UC Irvine			
Humanities	Philosophy	Dagfinn Follesdal	Stanford University	Interpretation of Husserl's phenomenology		
Humanities	Philosophy	Gilbert H. Harman	Princeton University	Nature of reasoning		
Humanities	Philosophy	George L. Kline	Bryn Mawr College	History of Russian ethical and social theory from the 18th century to the present		
Humanities	Philosophy	Donald J. Munro	University of Michigan	Concept of human nature in the pre-Qin, Song, and Maoist periods		
Humanities	Religion	William F. May	Indiana University	Public responsibility of the professional, across professions		
Humanities	Religion	Elaine H. Pagels	Barnard College	Politics and religion in early Christianity		
Humanities	Religion	Millard Kent Schumaker	Queen's Theological College	Gift relationship (such as philanthropy) in moral theory		
Humanities	Religion	Mark C. Taylor	Williams College	Comparative analysis of the philosophical and theological positions of Hegel and Kierkegaard		
Humanities	Renaissance History	Paul F. Grendler	University of Toronto	Primary and secondary education in Renaissance Venice, 1500-1650		
Humanities	Renaissance History	Frank Manley	Emory University	Editing and translating a 15th-century Latin account of Turkish life and culture	Also won in 1966	
Humanities	Russian History	John L. H. Keep	University of Toronto			
Humanities	Slavic Literature	Joan Grossman	UC Berkeley	Valery Bryusov		
Humanities	South Asian Studies	David G. Rubin	Sarah Lawrence College	20th-century Hindi literature		
Humanities	Spanish & Portuguese Literature	Alicia Colombí de Ferrares	Mills College	Poetics of the Spanish Renaissance		
Humanities	Spanish & Portuguese Literature	Harry Sieber	Johns Hopkins University			
Humanities	Spanish & Portuguese Literature	Stanko B. Vranich	Lehman College	Critical edition of the complete works of Don Juan de Arguijo		
Humanities	Theatre Arts	Jo Anne Akalaitis	Mabou Mines	Experimental theatre		
Humanities	Theatre Arts	Elizabeth Swados		Experiments in the theater and musical performance		
Humanities	United States History	Robert F. Berkhofer	University of Michigan	Evolution of American social organization, 1750-1850		
Humanities	United States History	Robert J. C. Butow	University of Washington		Also won in 1965	
Humanities	United States History	Norris C. Hundley	UCLA	Evolution of Indian water rights in the American West		
Humanities	United States History	Susan Estabrook Kennedy	Virginia Commonwealth University	Herbert Hoover during his post-presidential years		
Humanities	United States History	Gerald W. McFarland	University of Massachusetts Amherst	Family and migration in 19th-century America		
Humanities	United States History	John Modell	University of Minnesota			
Humanities	United States History	Robert V. Remini	University of Illinois at Chicago			
Humanities	United States History	David E. Stannard	Yale University	Changing perceptions of self during the course of American history		
Humanities	United States History	J. Mills Thornton III	University of Michigan			
Natural Sciences	Applied Mathematics	Stuart S. Antman	University of Maryland	Research at Oxford		
Natural Sciences	Applied Mathematics	Michael E. Fisher	Cornell University	Mathematical physics and chemistry	Also won in 1970	
Natural Sciences	Applied Mathematics	Sherwin A. Maslowe	McGill University			
Natural Sciences	Applied Mathematics	Cathleen S. Morawetz	New York University	Partial differential equations	Also won in 1966	
Natural Sciences	Applied Mathematics	Lawrence Sirovich	Brown University	Mathematical methods and modeling in biophysics		
Natural Sciences	Astronomy and Astrophysics	Don Q. Lamb	University of Illinois	Comparison of "theoretical and observational X-ray spectra... and establish[ment of] techniques for potentially unravelling the internal structure and dynamical behavior of degenerate stars using observations and pulsating X-ray sources"		
Natural Sciences	Astronomy and Astrophysics	Michael Oppenheimer	Harvard University			
Natural Sciences	Astronomy and Astrophysics	Robert V. Wagoner	Stanford University	Gravitational radiation and cosmology		
Natural Sciences	Chemistry	Eugene C. Ashby	Georgia Institute of Technology	Research at Stanford University		
Natural Sciences	Chemistry	John I. Brauman	Stanford University	Physical organic chemistry		
Natural Sciences	Chemistry	Christopher Edward Brion	University of British Columbia			
Natural Sciences	Chemistry	Phillip R. Certain	University of Wisconsin Madison			
Natural Sciences	Chemistry	Robert C. Dunbar	Case Western Reserve University	New methods of ion spectroscopy		
Natural Sciences	Chemistry	Willis H. Flygare	University of Illinois Urbana-Champaign		Also won in 1971	
Natural Sciences	Chemistry	Darleane C. Hoffman	Los Alamos Scientific Laboratory	Mechanisms of nuclear fission		
Natural Sciences	Chemistry	Roald Hoffmann	Cornell University	Organic and organometallic chemistry		
Natural Sciences	Chemistry	James T. Hynes	University of Colorado Boulder			
Natural Sciences	Chemistry	Andrew S. Kende	University of Rochester	New anti-cancer drugs		
Natural Sciences	Chemistry	Donald J. Kouri	University of Houston			
Natural Sciences	Chemistry	Richard G. Lawton	University of Michigan			
Natural Sciences	Chemistry	Wilma K. Olson	Rutgers University	Assembly of molecular particles in living systems		
Natural Sciences	Chemistry	Howard Reiss	UCLA	Chemical physics		
Natural Sciences	Chemistry	Martin F. Semmelhack	Cornell University	Organometallic chemistry		
Natural Sciences	Computer Science	Robert E. Tarjan	Stanford University	Design and analysis of combinatorial algorithms		
Natural Sciences	Computer Science	Arthur F. Veinott	Stanford University	Operations research and mathematical programming		
Natural Sciences	Earth Science	William M. Kaula	UCLA	Dynamical aspects of solar system origin		
Natural Sciences	Earth Science	Juhn G. Liou	Stanford University	Low-temperature interactions of rocks and aqueous solutions		
Natural Sciences	Earth Science	John Suppe	Princeton University	Tectonics of western Taiwan		
Natural Sciences	Engineering	Zdeněk P. Bažant	Northwestern University	Inelastic behavior and failure of geological materials, especially concretes		
Natural Sciences	Engineering	David B. Geselowitz	Pennsylvania State University	Electrocardiography		
Natural Sciences	Mathematics	Maurice Auslander	Brandeis University			
Natural Sciences	Mathematics	Lipman Bers	Columbia University	Teichmüller spaces and related topics	Also won in 1959	
Natural Sciences	Mathematics	George Glauberman	University of Chicago			
Natural Sciences	Mathematics	Paul H. Rabinowitz	University of Wisconsin Madison			
Natural Sciences	Mathematics	Edward B. Saff	University of South Florida	Numerical analysis		
Natural Sciences	Mathematics	Dana S. Scott	University of Oxford			
Natural Sciences	Mathematics	Daniel W. Stroock	University of Colorado Boulder			
Natural Sciences	Medicine & Health	Don W. Fawcett	Harvard Medical School			
Natural Sciences	Molecular and Cellular Biology	Carolyn Cohen	Brandeis University			
Natural Sciences	Molecular and Cellular Biology	Donald M. Crothers	Yale University	Democracy and critics		
Natural Sciences	Molecular and Cellular Biology	Martin Dworkin	University of Minnesota			
Natural Sciences	Molecular and Cellular Biology	Donald M. Engelman	Yale University	Structural molecular biology		
Natural Sciences	Molecular and Cellular Biology	Irving B. Fritz	University of Toronto			
Natural Sciences	Molecular and Cellular Biology	Richard J. Roberts	Cold Spring Harbor Laboratory	Molecular genetics		
Natural Sciences	Molecular and Cellular Biology	Melvin I. Simon	UC San Diego	Molecular biology		
Natural Sciences	Neuroscience	James R. Bamburg	Colorado State University	Structure and function of proteins in nerve cells		
Natural Sciences	Neuroscience	Leo M. Chalupa	UC Davis	Processes of the visual system		
Natural Sciences	Neuroscience	John E. Dowling	Harvard University	Research at Churchill College		
Natural Sciences	Neuroscience	R. Glenn Northcutt	University of Michigan	Research with Theodore Holmes Bullock		
Natural Sciences	Organismic Biology and Ecology	Martin Leonard Cody	UCLA	Evolution of bird and plant communities in desert habitats		
Natural Sciences	Organismic Biology and Ecology	Michael T. Ghiselin	UC Berkeley	Progress and pragmatism		
Natural Sciences	Organismic Biology and Ecology	Karel F. Liem	Harvard University		Also won in 1970	
Natural Sciences	Organismic Biology and Ecology	Lynn Margulis	Boston University	Microbial mats		
Natural Sciences	Organismic Biology and Ecology	Eric R. Pianka	University of Texas at Austin	Research in the Australian Outback		
Natural Sciences	Physics	David S. Cannell	UC Santa Barbara	Polymer physics		
Natural Sciences	Physics	William Chinowsky	UC Berkeley	High-energy particle physics	Also won in 1966	
Natural Sciences	Physics	Marvin L. Cohen	UC Berkeley	Solid-state physics	Also won in 1990	
Natural Sciences	Physics	James Maurice Daniels	University of Toronto			
Natural Sciences	Physics	Sherman Frankel	University of Pennsylvania	High-energy physics	Also won in 1956	
Natural Sciences	Physics	Roger A. Hegstrom	Wake Forest University	Atomic and molecular physics		
Natural Sciences	Physics	Vernon W. Hughes	Yale University	Elementary particle physics		
Natural Sciences	Physics	Wonyong Lee	Columbia University	High-energy physics		
Natural Sciences	Physics	John H. Schwarz	California Institute of Technology	Supergravity, supersymmetrical strings, and related matter		
Natural Sciences	Physics	William E. Spicer	Stanford University	Electronic structure and chemistry of solid surfaces		
Natural Sciences	Physics	Donald R. Yennie	Cornell University	Elementary particle physics		
Natural Sciences	Plant Science	Aharon Gibor	UC Santa Barbara	Techniques of plant cloning as it applies to seaweeds which are or can be used as food, chemicals, medicines, fuel, fertilizers, and emulsifiers		
Social Sciences	Anthropology & Cultural Studies	Robert I. Levy	UC San Diego	Society, culture, and mind in a Nepalese sacred Hindu city		
Social Sciences	Anthropology & Cultural Studies	Gananath Obeyesekere	UC San Diego	Sociology of Sinhala Buddhism		
Social Sciences	Anthropology & Cultural Studies	Joel Sherzer	University of Texas at Austin	Guna people		
Social Sciences	Anthropology & Cultural Studies	Michael Silverstein	University of Chicago			
Social Sciences	Anthropology & Cultural Studies	Anthony F. C. Wallace	University of Pennsylvania	Mechanical inventors and their role in the diffusion of industrial technology		
Social Sciences	Economics	James J. Heckman	University of Chicago			
Social Sciences	Economics	Marc Nerlove	Northwestern University	Research at the Smithsonian Institution	Also won in 1962	
Social Sciences	Economics	Edmund S. Phelps	Columbia University	International economic justice		
Social Sciences	Economics	Michael Rothschild	University of Wisconsin			
Social Sciences	Economics	Ross M. Starr	UC Davis	Microeconomic foundations of macroeconomic analysis		
Social Sciences	Education	Jurgen Herbst	University of Wisconsin Madison	Legal and governmental history of American colleges and universities, 1636-1819		
Social Sciences	Education	Joseph Katz	SUNY at Stony Brook	Attitudes of German university students authority		
Social Sciences	Geography & Environmental Studies	John E. Hay	University of British Columbia			
Social Sciences	Geography & Environmental Studies	Hilgard O'Reilly Sternberg	UC Berkeley	Internal migrations and settlement of "empty lands" in Mato Grosso, Brazil		
Social Sciences	Law	Alan M. Dershowitz	Harvard Law School	Human rights		
Social Sciences	Law	Ian R. Macneil	Cornell University	Development of a general theory of contract		
Social Sciences	Law	Peter B. Maggs	University of Illinois College of Law			
Social Sciences	Law	Lawrence A. Sullivan	UC Berkeley	Dynamics of American and Common Market antitrust policy		
Social Sciences	Political Science	Walter F. Berns	University of Toronto			
Social Sciences	Political Science	Robert A. Dahl	Yale University		Also won in 1950	
Social Sciences	Political Science	Robert Jervis	UCLA	Decision-making in questions of foreign policy		
Social Sciences	Political Science	David R. Mayhew	Yale University	American political parties		
Social Sciences	Political Science	Giovanni Sartori	Stanford University	Comparative study of parties and political systems		
Social Sciences	Political Science	James C. Scott	Yale University	Examination of culture and class relations in rural Southeast Asia		
Social Sciences	Psychology	Marshall M. Haith	University of Denver			
Social Sciences	Psychology	David B. Pisoni	Indiana University	Role of environment in development of speech perception		
Social Sciences	Psychology	David Premack	University of Pennsylvania	Cognition in primates		
Social Sciences	Psychology	Dean G. Pruitt	SUNY Buffalo	Unified theory of negotiation		
Social Sciences	Psychology	Robert B. Zajonc	University of Michigan			
Social Sciences	Sociology	E. Digby Baltzell	University of Pennsylvania	Political reform and cultural renaissance in Philadelphia, 1947-1976		
Social Sciences	Sociology	Howard S. Becker	Northwestern University			
Social Sciences	Sociology	Stephen Cole	SUNY at Stony Brook	Hierarchy of the sciences		
Social Sciences	Sociology	Claude S. Fischer	UC Berkeley	Urban social psychology		
Social Sciences	Sociology	William A. Gamson	University of Michigan			
Social Sciences	Sociology	Orlando Patterson	Harvard University	Comparisons of different forms of slavery		
Social Sciences	Sociology	Martin Rein	Massachusetts Institute of Technology			
Social Sciences	Sociology	Alan A. Stone	Harvard University			

== 1978 Latin American and Caribbean Fellows ==
Category	Field of Study	Fellow	Institutional association	Research topic	Notes	Ref
Creative Arts	Fiction	Antonio Cisneros Campoy	National University of San Marcos	Writing		
Creative Arts	Fiction	David Huerta		Writing		
Creative Arts	Film-Video	Fernando Gagliuffi Kolich				
Creative Arts	Fine Arts	Winston Branch		Painting		
Creative Arts	Fine Arts	Asdrubal Colmenarez	University of Paris VIII	Finished his project Alphabet Polysensoriel		
Creative Arts	Fine Arts	Rubens Gerchman	Escola de Artes Visuais do Parque Lage			
Creative Arts	Photography	Marco Antonio Valdivia				
Creative Arts	Video & Audio	Andrea Tonacci		Research into North and South American native populations	Also won in 1982	
Humanities	General Nonfiction	Jorge Eielson				
Humanities	General Nonfiction	Shivadhar Srinivasa Naipaul				
Humanities	Iberian & Latin American History	Enrique Krauze Kleinbort	El Colegio de México			
Humanities	Music History	Luis Jorge González				
Natural Sciences	Computer Science	Carlos José Pereira Lucena	Pontifical Catholic University of Rio de Janeiro			
Natural Sciences	Earth Science	Carlos Roberto González	National University of Tucumán and CONICET			
Natural Sciences	Mathematics	Rafael Panzone	National University of the South			
Natural Sciences	Medicine & Health	Antonio Paes de Carvalho	National Education Council of Brazil	Cardiac electrophysiology		
Natural Sciences	Molecular Biology and Ecology	Norbel Galanti	University of Chile			
Natural Sciences	Molecular Biology and Ecology	Elisa Marusic	University of Chile	Research at Yale University School of Medicine		
Natural Sciences	Neuroscience	Daniel Pedro Cardinali	CONICET			
Natural Sciences	Organismic Biology & Ecology	Humberto R. Maturana	University of Chile			
Natural Sciences	Physics	Carlos Aragone	Simón Bolívar University			
Natural Sciences	Plant Science	Alfredo Elio Cocucci	National University of Córdoba	Research at UC Berkeley		
Natural Sciences	Plant Science	Armando T. Hunziker			Also won in 1960	
Natural Sciences	Plant Science	Gerardo Martínez-López	Instituto Colombiano Agropecuario			
Social Sciences	Anthropology & Cultural Studies	Manuel Dannemann	University of Chile			
Social Sciences	Anthropology & Cultural Studies	Larissa Adler Lomnitz	National Autonomous University of Mexico			
Social Sciences	Economics	Guillermo Flichman	Centro de Estudios de Estado y Sociedad			
Social Sciences	Political Science	Gustavo Ferrari	Torcuato di Tella Institute			
Social Sciences	Sociology	Leôncio Martins Rodrigues	University of São Paulo			

== See also ==
- Guggenheim Fellowship
- List of Guggenheim Fellowships awarded in 1977
- List of Guggenheim Fellowships awarded in 1979
