= William McAllister =

William McAllister may refer to:

- William M. McAllister, American politician and jurist in Oregon
- William K. McAllister, American jurist in Illinois
- William Balmer McAllister, Ontario businessman and political figure
- William McAllister, Scottish circus performer most well known as Doodles the Clown
- Billy McAllister (footballer), Scottish footballer

== See also ==
- Billy McAllister, Australian boxer
- William McAllister-Johnson, Canadian scholar of the history of prints and printmaking
