= Cecil Effinger =

Composer, oboist, inventor

Cecil Effinger (July 22, 1914 – December 22, 1990) was an American composer, oboist, and inventor.

== Life ==
Effinger was born in Colorado Springs, Colorado and resided in the state for most of his life. Reversing the usual cliché, he was the son of musicians and teachers, but initially studied mathematics at Colorado College, receiving a BA in 1935, before deciding to follow in his parents' footsteps. In the meantime, he had studied harmony and counterpoint with Frederick Boothroyd in 1934–36, and went to Paris in 1939 to study composition with Nadia Boulanger. He was first oboe in the orchestras of Colorado Springs (1934–41) and Denver (1937–41) and taught at the Colorado College before the Second World War (1936–41). A lifelong friendship with Roy Harris began in 1941. During the Second World War he served as conductor of the 506th US Army Band in Fort Logan. After the war, he resumed his position at the Colorado College from 1946 to 1948, when he was appointed professor of composition at the University of Colorado in Boulder. He remained in that position, becoming the head of the composition department until 1981, and was composer-in-residence there until his retirement in 1984.

In 1945 in Paris, Effinger conceived the idea of a music typewriter, and by 1947 had developed a rough prototype. In March 1954 he patented his machine as the "Musicwriter", and exhibited his first production model in July 1955, in Denver. It was simple and robust in construction and was a commercial success throughout the world for more than thirty years. He also invented a device to accurately determine the tempo of music as it is being performed, which he called the Tempowatch.

== Compositions ==
Effinger was a prolific composer, with 168 works in his catalog, including five numbered symphonies, two Little Symphonies, and five String Quartets. Choral works figure among his most popular compositions, several of which are large scale and based on sacred subjects, including especially Four Pastorales for oboe and chorus. Effinger never embraced experimentalism, and settled on an idiom he described as "atonal tonality". He never achieved a national reputation, but was esteemed as a regional composer of high standing. Some of his music was published by Novello, Schirmer, and other smaller publishing firms.

== Discography ==
- The American Spirit. St. Martin's Chamber Choir, Timothy J. Krueger (cond.); Sue Logan (oboe); Tamara Goldstein (piano). St. Martin's Chamber Choir 4. CD recording. 2007. (Cecil Effinger, "Four Pastorales" for chorus and oboe, and works by Edward MacDowell, Terry Schlenker, Tim Sarsany, Timothy J. Krueger, Randall Thompson, and Jean Berger.)
- First Recordings of Two Naumberg Award Compositions. Carroll Glenn (violin); Columbia Symphony Orchestra, Zoltan Rozsnyai (cond.). Columbia MS 6597. New York: Columbia Records, [n.d.]. (With Cecil Effinger, Little Symphony No. 1, op. 31 and Andrew Imbrie, Violin Concerto)
- The Concert Accordion Artistry of Robert Davine. Robert Davine (accordion), Lamont Chamber Players. Crystal 160. CD recording, 1 disc. Crystal Records, 1995. (Cecil Effinger, "Nocturne", with works by Hans Lang, Paul Creston, Ted Zarlengo, Adamo Volpi, Normand Lockwood, John Gart, Carmelo Pino, David Diamond, and Mátyás Seiber.)
- Roy Harris: Symphony No. 11. Sinfonia Varsovia, Ian Hobson (cond.). Donald R. Peterson Recording Series 2. Troy 1042. SACD, 1 disc. Albany, NY: Albany Records; Kendal, Cumbria: Albany Records UK, 2008. (With Cecil Effinger, Little Symphony No. 1, op. 31; Morton Gould, Cowboy Rhapsody; Douglas Moore, Symphony No. 2 in A major.)
