= Ars Nova Singers =

American choral ensemble

- Genres: Choral, Classical
- Years active: 1986–present
- Labels: New Art Recordings

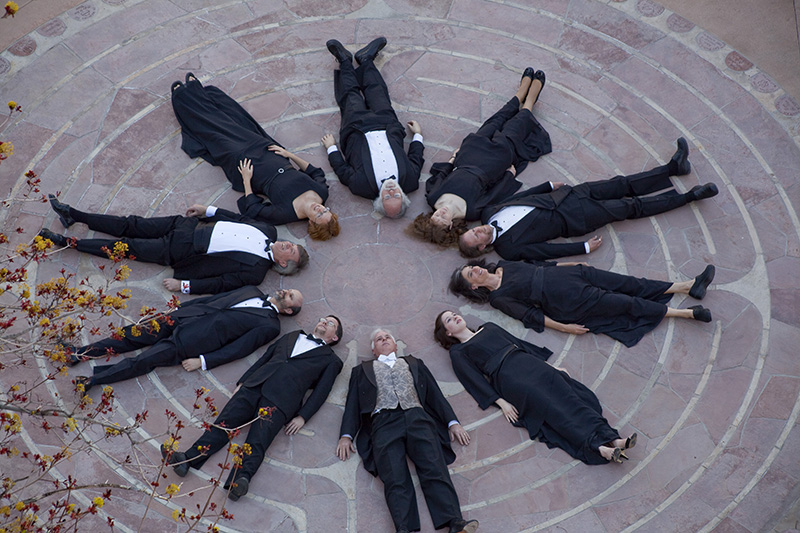
Ars Nova Singers

The Ars Nova Singers is a choral ensemble based in Boulder, Colorado. Founded in 1986, Ars Nova Singers is composed of about 40 singers who were selected through auditions from the Boulder / Denver metropolitan area. Ars Nova has achieved significant national recognition, recording ten critically acclaimed solo recordings as well as performing on seven recordings with Boulder composer and instrumentalist, Bill Douglas.

Ars Nova performs a variety of music but specializes in a cappella works of Renaissance masters and contemporary works by 20th and 21st century composers. The ensemble's musical accomplishments include performances of the music of Hildegard of Bingen, concerts of the complete Responsoria by the late-Renaissance composer Carlo Gesualdo, acclaimed performances of the a cappella works of Rachmaninoff (the Vespers and Liturgy of St. John), and the commissioning and premiering of new works.

== Performances ==
Since their founding, the Ars Nova Singers has done over 300 live performances of over 100 concert programs. The group has been featured on radio broadcasts throughout North and South America, Australia, Japan, and Europe, including such National Public Radio programs as The First Art, Music from the Hearts of Space, and locally on Colorado Public Radio's Colorado Matters and Colorado Spotlight programs.

Honors include an invitation-only performance on National Public Radio in Washington, D.C. (2006); performances at the national conventions of Chorus America (2002); and The American Guild of Organists (1998); and with world renowned vocal group VOCES8 (2023); and support from the Chorus Program of the National Endowment for the Arts and the Performing Ensembles program of the Aaron Copland Fund for Music.

== Collaborations ==
Ars Nova has collaborated with other musicians and arts organizations in the Rocky Mountain region, including: the Kronos Quartet; Boulder Philharmonic Orchestra; Colorado Music Festival; Colorado MahlerFest; Frequent Flyers Dance Company; St. Martin’s Chamber Choir; Denver Chamber Orchestra; Colorado Mormon Chorale; Pro Musica Colorado, and the Sphere Ensemble.

The choir has participated in commissioning/new music projects, performing new works by Libby Larsen, Stephen Paulus, Luis Jorge González, Jan Gilbert, R. Anthony Lee, and Terry Schlenker. In September 2002 the ensemble premiered I Heard a Voice, a major new work composed by Thomas Edward Morgan and New York visual artist Lesley Dill and subsequently performed internationally at the Evergreen Cultural Centre in Coquitlam, British Columbia (2003). In 2007, the ensemble premiered a commissioned work by composer Steven Stucky, winner of the 2005 Pulitzer Prize.

== Discography ==
=== Solo Recordings ===
- A Floweret Bright: Christmas Music of the Renaissance and the 20th Century (1993)
- Soundscapes (1995)
- A Shadow and a Dream (1997)
- Midwinter: Carols in Concert (2000)
- All Sky (2000)
- I Heard a Voice (2002)
- Luminescence (2004)
- Rachmaninoff Vespers (2005)
- Blue True Dream (2006)
- Yuletide (2009)

=== Featured on ===
Recordings by Bill Douglas:

- Circle of Moons (1995)
- Deep Peace (1996)
- Songs of Earth & Sky (1998)
- Earth Prayer (1999)
- Eternity's Sunrise (2000)
- A Place Called Morning (2001)
- Homeland: A Prayer for Peace (2002)
- Sky (2005)
