= John Loomis =

John Loomis may refer to:

- John Mason Loomis (1825–1900), American businessman and lumber tycoon
- John Q. Loomis (1824–1869), Confederate States Army officer

== See also ==
- Jon Loomis (born 1959), American poet and writer
