= Boulder Philharmonic Orchestra =

American symphonic orchestra

- Orchestra
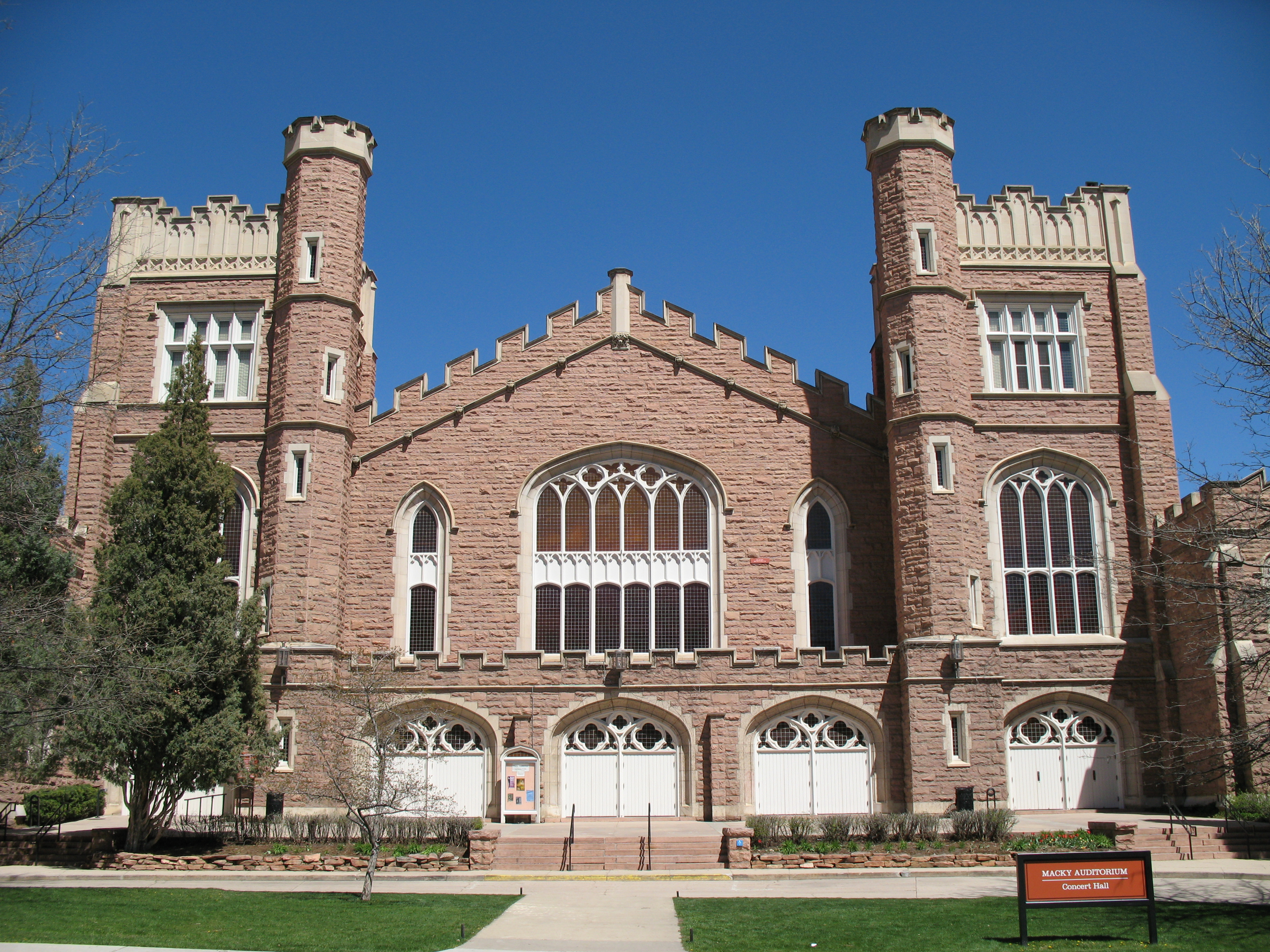
- Founded: 1958
- Concert hall: Macky Auditorium, University of Colorado at Boulder
- Music director: Michael Butterman
- Website: www.boulderphil.org

The Boulder Philharmonic Orchestra, founded in 1958, is a professional symphony orchestra based in Boulder, Colorado. It is led by Music Director Michael Butterman. The Boulder Philharmonic's season at Macky Auditorium on the University of Colorado at Boulder campus and other venues includes classical music, pops, school and family concerts, as well as an annual production of The Nutcracker with Boulder Ballet.

== History ==
=== Precursor Years: 1893-1957 ===
The roots of the Boulder Philharmonic can be traced to 1893 when a small group of Boulder musicians calling themselves the Philharmonic Club started performing an annual concert that gradually grew in popularity. In 1941 the Civic Symphony Orchestra was founded as one phase of a recreational program in a plan adopted by the city council. Hugh McMillen, director of bands at the University of Colorado at Boulder conducted the first free orchestra at Boulder High School auditorium, a tradition that continued in 1943 and 1944. The loss of personnel due to WWII, however, caused the orchestra to disband.

=== Founding Years: 1957-1972 ===
Violinist Elinor Winchester and volunteer musicians revived the orchestra in March 1957. Thomas Facey, conductor of the Golden Symphony, served as musical director. During this time the orchestra was an ensemble made up of amateurs as well as a few professional musicians from the Boulder-Denver area. In 1958 Facey resigned and Dr. Antonia Brico was named conductor. Pianist, graduate of the University of California Berkeley, and the first woman to conduct the New York Philharmonic Orchestra, Brico saw developments such as the Young Artist Competition in 1959 and the inauguration of the Children's Concert in 1960.

Brico resigned in 1964 and Ador Toth, CU Boulder associate professor of music and conductor of the university symphony orchestra, was named her successor. Toth requested a leave of absence in 1965 to tour with the Alma Trio, and invited his CU colleague, David Burge, to take over as conductor for the 1965–66 season. Burge was named permanent conductor of the Boulder Philharmonic after his first year.

In 1966, the Boulder Philharmonic Guild was founded as an “auxiliary dedicated to assisting with the maintenance of the orchestra with service as well as with financial means.” In 1970 the Jr. Guild was founded, which sponsored a flea market, a spring Philharmonic Ball and Symphony Sunday at which time local downtown merchants shared Christmas sale profits with the orchestra.

Aside from a one-year sabbatical to Copenhagen (during which James Stroud took over as conductor), Burge's tenure lasted until 1972, when he joined the faculty at the Eastman School of Music.

=== Lehnert and Kuchar years: 1972-2006 ===
Oswald (Ozzi) Lehnert, violin virtuoso and professor, was named conductor and music director of the Boulder Philharmonic in 1972. Under Lehnert, the Boulder Philharmonic saw many developments, such as new fundraising campaigns, free concert series, and a Tier II status from the Scientific and Cultural Facilities District. Also, during this time the Boulder Phil moved to 2,052-seat Macky Auditorium, the city's premiere concert hall on the University of Colorado Boulder campus. In 1990 the Boulder Arts Academy was founded as a community school under the direction of the Boulder Philharmonic.

Theodore Kuchar was named music director in 1996, under whose leadership the Boulder Philharmonic Orchestra became a fully professional symphony orchestra. Kuchar also founded the Sinfonia of Colorado, a classical chamber orchestra made up of philharmonic musicians in 1997. In 1999, the Boulder Philharmonic became a part of an alliance organization called the Peak Association of the Arts, also known as PeakArts, which also included the Boulder Ballet, Sinfonia of Colorado and the Boulder Arts Academy. Guest artists during this time included violinists Itzhak Perlman and Hilary Hahn, and cellist Yo-Yo Ma.

In 2001, Robert McAllister was named CEO and president of PeakArts, and in 2003 this association dissolved into two entities: Boulder Arts Academy / Boulder Ballet and the Boulder Philharmonic. Also in 2003, Sue Levine was hired as the executive director of PeakArts. Theodore Kuchar left the organization in 2006.

=== Michael Butterman: 2007–Present ===
The Boulder Philharmonic Orchestra celebrated its 50th anniversary with its 2007–2008 season, under the leadership of new music director Michael Butterman. Michael Butterman is currently the music director for both the Boulder Philharmonic and the Shreveport Symphony Orchestra. He is also on the conducting staff of the Jacksonville Symphony Orchestra and the principal conductor for education and outreach with the Rochester Philharmonic Orchestra. In 2014, it was announced that Butterman's contract had been renewed for five years, through the 2018–19 season.

Under Butterman's direction, the Boulder Philharmonic inaugurated a series of Discovery Concerts serving thousands of area elementary school students. Guest artists during his tenure have included violinist Sarah Chang, clarinetist Richard Stoltzman, and the Takács Quartet, in addition to numerous collaborations with Ars Nova Singers, St. Martin's Chamber Choir, Boulder Chorale, Colorado Shakespeare Festival, Frequent Flyers Aerial Dance, Boulder International Film Festival and others. Together with Executive Director Kevin Shuck, who joined the organization in 2010, Michael Butterman has also led an expansion of the Boulder Philharmonic's regional presence with concerts in Arvada, Denver, Highlands Ranch, Lakewood, Lone Tree and the Vilar Performing Arts Center in Beaver Creek.

In May 2015, it was announced that the Boulder Philharmonic Orchestra had been selected as one of four orchestras nationally to perform at the John F. Kennedy Center for the Performing Arts in Washington, D.C., as part of the inaugural SHIFT Festival in March 2017 showcasing innovation in American orchestras. Later that same year, it was announced that the Boulder Phil was awarded its first federal grant from the National Endowment for the Arts to support the commission of a new work to be premiered as part of this national festival.

== Premieres ==
In addition to numerous regional and local premieres, world premieres presented by the Boulder Philharmonic Orchestra have included:

- Alvin Brehm, Concerto for Tuba and Orchestra (1977)
- Bernhard Heiden, Concerto for Tuba and Orchestra (1977)
- Charles G. Eakin, Fantasy for Saxophone & Orchestra (1981)
- Richard Toensing, Concerto for Flutes and Orchestra (2000)
- Michael Allen's orchestration of Modest Mussorgsky, Pictures at an Exhibition (2007)
- Luis Jorge Gonzalez, The Wondrous City (2007)
- Rony Barrak, Beirut Sensations (2009)
- Bill Douglas (musician), Concerto for Darbouka and Orchestra (2009)
- Ruby Fulton, Gambit: Beatbox Concerto (2012)
- Rony Barrak, Boulder Sensations (2012)
- Jeffrey Nytch, Symphony No. 1 ("Formations"); celebrating the 125th anniversary of the Geological Society of America (2013)
- J. Ralph, original orchestrations from the Academy Award-winning environmental documentaries Chasing Ice and The Cove (film) (2014)
- Stephen Lias, Gates of the Arctic; celebrating the 50th anniversary of America's Wilderness Act, with visuals (2014)
- Charles Denler, Portraits in Season; inspired by the writings of Henry David Thoreau and choreographed to the nature photography of John Fielder (2015)
- Missy Mazzoli, Sinfonia (for Orbiting Spheres), as part of a New Music USA residency (2016)
- Stephen Lias, TBA; celebrating the centennial of the National Park Service, with visuals (2017)

== Musicians ==
Music Director:

- Michael Butterman

Concertmaster:

- Charles Wetherbee

Current Orchestra Roster:

- http://boulderphil.org/about/orchestra

== Sources ==
Ruth Carmel Kahn. “50 years with the Boulder Philharmonic.” Boulder Philharmonic Program Book. 2007–2008.
