= Marianne Boruch =

American poet (born 1950)

- Born: June 19, 1950 (age 76); Chicago, Illinois, U.S.
- Education: University of Illinois; University of Massachusetts Amherst (MFA)
- Occupation: Poet
- Writing career
- Notable awards: Pushcart Prize (1988, 2001, 2012, 2016); Kingsley Tufts Poetry Award (2013)

Marianne Boruch (born June 19, 1950) is an American poet whose published work also includes essays on poetry, sometimes in relation to other fields (music, visual art, ornithology, medicine, aviation, etc.) and a memoir about a hitchhiking trip taken in 1971.

== Life ==
Born and raised Catholic in Chicago, Boruch was educated in parish schools and spent many summers in Tuscola, Illinois with her grandparents. She graduated from the University of Illinois, then earned her MFA from the University of Massachusetts Amherst where her MFA thesis advisor was James Tate. She has taught at Tunghai University in Taiwan, and at the University of Maine at Farmington, going on, in 1987, to develop and direct the MFA program in creative writing at Purdue University where she continues as a professor emeritus.

Since 1988, she has also taught semi-regularly in the low-residency MFA Program for Writers at Warren Wilson College. On occasion, she's run workshops and given lectures and readings at summer writers' conferences, among them Bread Loaf, the Haystack School of the Arts, Bear River, and RopeWalk.

Her poems and essays have appeared in The New Yorker, Poetry, American Poetry Review, The Yale Review, The Georgia Review, The Paris Review, The London Review of Books, The Massachusetts Review, The Hudson Review, New England Review, Ploughshares, Poetry London,"The New York Review of Books", "The Nation", "Narrative", FIELD, Poetry 180, Poets of the New Century, Poets Reading: The FIELD Symposia, Hammer and Blaze: A Gathering of Poets, American Alphabets: 25 Contemporary Poets, Best American Poetry, and elsewhere.

She lives with her husband in West Lafayette, Indiana.

=== Collections ===
==== Poetry ====
- View from the Gazebo (Wesleyan Univ. Press, 1985)
- Descendant (Wesleyan Univ. Press, 1989)
- Moss Burning (Oberlin College Press, 1993)
- A Stick That Breaks and Breaks (Oberlin College Press, 1997)
- Poems: New & Selected (Oberlin College Press, 2004)
- Ghost and Oar (chapbook: Red Dragonfly Press, 2007)
- Grace, Fallen from (Wesleyan Univ. Press, 2008; paperback edition, 2010)
- The Book of Hours (Copper Canyon Press, 2011)
- Cadaver, Speak (Copper Canyon Press, 2014)
- Eventually One Dreams the Real Thing (Copper Canyon Press, 2016)
- The Anti-Grief (Copper Canyon Press, 2019)
- Bestiary Dark (Copper Canyon Press, 2021)

==== Essays ====
- Poetry's Old Air (Poets on Poetry Series, Univ. of Michigan Press, 1995)
- In the Blue Pharmacy (Trinity University Press, 2005)
- The Little Death of Self: Nine Essays toward Poetry (University of Michigan Press, 2017)
- Sing by the Burying Ground: essays (Northwestern University Press, Evanston, IL, 2024)

=== Memoirs ===
- The Glimpse Traveler (Indiana University Press, 2011)
- The Figure Going Imaginary--Poetry/ Life Drawing/ The Cadaver Lab--A Year in Pieces(Copper Canyon Press, 2025)

== Awards ==
Her poetry collection, The Book of Hours published in 2013 by Copper Canyon Press, won the 2013 Kingsley Tufts Poetry Award. Her most recent collection, Bestiary Dark, was published in 2021 by Copper Canyon Press.

Her awards include fellowships from the Guggenheim Foundation, and the National Endowment for the Arts, and residencies at MacDowell, Yaddo, The Anderson Center (Red Wing, MN), Hall Farm, Djerassi, and the Rockefeller Foundation's Bellagio Center.

- Residencies/Fellowships, Yaddo, February into March, 2025; October-November, 2023; November–December, 2019; January 2016, and May 2014.
- Fulbright Senior Scholar, International Poetry Studies Institute at the University of Canberra, Australia, 2019.
- Artist-in-Residence, Central European University, Budapest, Hungary, January-February, 2024.
- Fellowships/residencies, MacDowell, February 2025; May 2018; May 2016; Nov-Dec, 2005 & 2007.
- Fellowship/Residency, Djerassi, Woodside, CA, May–June 2017.
- "Eventually One Dreams the Real Thing" cited in “Best Books of the Year” listing (“Most Loved Books of 2016”) The New Yorker, 2016.
- The Eugene & Marilyn Glick Indiana Authors Award (national division), 2015.
- Artist-in-Residence, Denali National Park, Alaska, 2015.
- Fellowships/residencies, The Anderson Center, Red Wing, MN, 2015, 2010, 2007, 2008.
- Visiting Artist Residencies, The American Academy in Rome, 2015, 2009.
- Kingsley Tufts Poetry Award, The Book of Hours, 2013.
- Fulbright/Visiting Professorship, University of Edinburgh, 2012.
- Fellowship, Institute for Advanced Studies in the Humanities, University of Edinburgh, Scotland, 2012.
- Gold award for Best Feature, "Cadaver, Speak" in The Georgia Review, The Southeast's GAMMA Awards, 2011.
- Poems chosen for Best American Poetry, 2016, 2009 and 1997.
- Residency/Fellowship, The Bellagio Center, the Rockefeller Foundation, 2009.
- Faculty Fellowship in a Second Discipline, Purdue University, 2008.
- The Strousse Award, for poems in Prairie Schooner, 2008.
- Guggenheim Foundation Fellowship, 2005–2006.
- Artist-in-Residence, Isle Royale National Park, 2006.
- Pushcart Prizes, 2016, 2012, 2001 and 1988.
- Poetry Fellowships from the National Endowment for the Arts, 1999 and 1984.
- Terrence Des Pres Award from Parnassus, 1994.
