= Choirs in Colorado =

Choirs and choruses based in Colorado

- Ars Nova Singers is an a cappella choral group based in Boulder, Colorado, USA. Ars Nova is composed of forty selectively auditioned all-volunteer singers from the greater Denver metropolitan area.
- The Arvada Chorale is a community chorus from Arvada, Colorado. The Chorale performs a wide variety of classical, contemporary, and jazz music.
- The Boulder Chorale is Boulder's oldest and largest community chorus. More than 200 singers, ages 5 to 90, perform in multiple ensembles, including the Boulder Concert Chorale, Boulder Chamber Chorale and Boulder Children's Chorale.
- The Cherry Creek Chorale. Director: Brian Leatherman.
- Choir League Launched in Denver in September 2018, Choir League is a social singing club geared toward young professionals that meets once a week in a local bar, restaurant, or business for rehearsal and a happy hour.
- The Colorado Children's Chorale is a singing group in Colorado that was founded in 1974. The Chorale consists of six choirs: Prep choir, Apprentice choir, Concert choir, Regional Tour choir, National Tour choir, and Transitions choir. They participate in over 130 annual performances.
- The Colorado Chorale was formed in 1970. The Chorale is under the direction of Artistic Director Dr. Kevin T. Padworski.
- Colorado Hebrew Chorale - The Colorado Hebrew Chorale was founded in 1993 and is a volunteer chorus that is dedicated to providing a voice for the Jewish experience through song. Based in Denver, it is a smaller choir.
- Denver Gay Men's Chorus - As part of the Rocky Mountain Arts Association, the Denver Gay Men’s Chorus is the first openly gay arts organization in Denver. It was formed in 1982. The group performs throughout the city delivering a message of acceptance and pride. Led by Artistic Director James Knapp.
- Denver Women’s Chorus - Also part of the Rocky Mountain Arts Association is the Denver Women’s Chorus. It was founded in 1984.
- Foothills Community Choir - Originally founded in 1996 under the name Wheat Ridge Community Chorale, FCC operates as a non-profit, inclusive, and non-audition chorus in the Denver Metro area. The choir is directed by Taylor Gonzales.
- Kantorei - Kantorei is a professional-caliber choral ensemble based in Denver, CO, led by Artistic Director Joel M. Rinsema.
- The Larimer Chorale - Founded in 1977 and composed of over 100 members, The Larimer Chorale is one of the largest and most accomplished community choral ensembles in the Rocky Mountain Region.
- The One World Singers was formed in 2010 when the Denver Turnverein Chorus changed its name.
- Orpheus Pagan Chamber Choir
- The Sound of the Rockies (SOR) is an a capella men's chorus based in greater Denver, Colorado.
- St. Martin's Chamber Choir Founded in 1994 by Timothy J. Krueger as Colorado’s only year-round, fully professional choir. In addition to performing six concert sets every season, St. Martin's has released 13 CD recordings.
- Voices West - An auditioned community choir with a 35-year history in Colorado, Voices West draws singers and supporters from Denver and the surrounding areas, including Littleton, Highlands Ranch, Centennial and Lakewood, with performances throughout the Front Range.
