= Wilma Olson =

American chemist

Wilma K. Olson
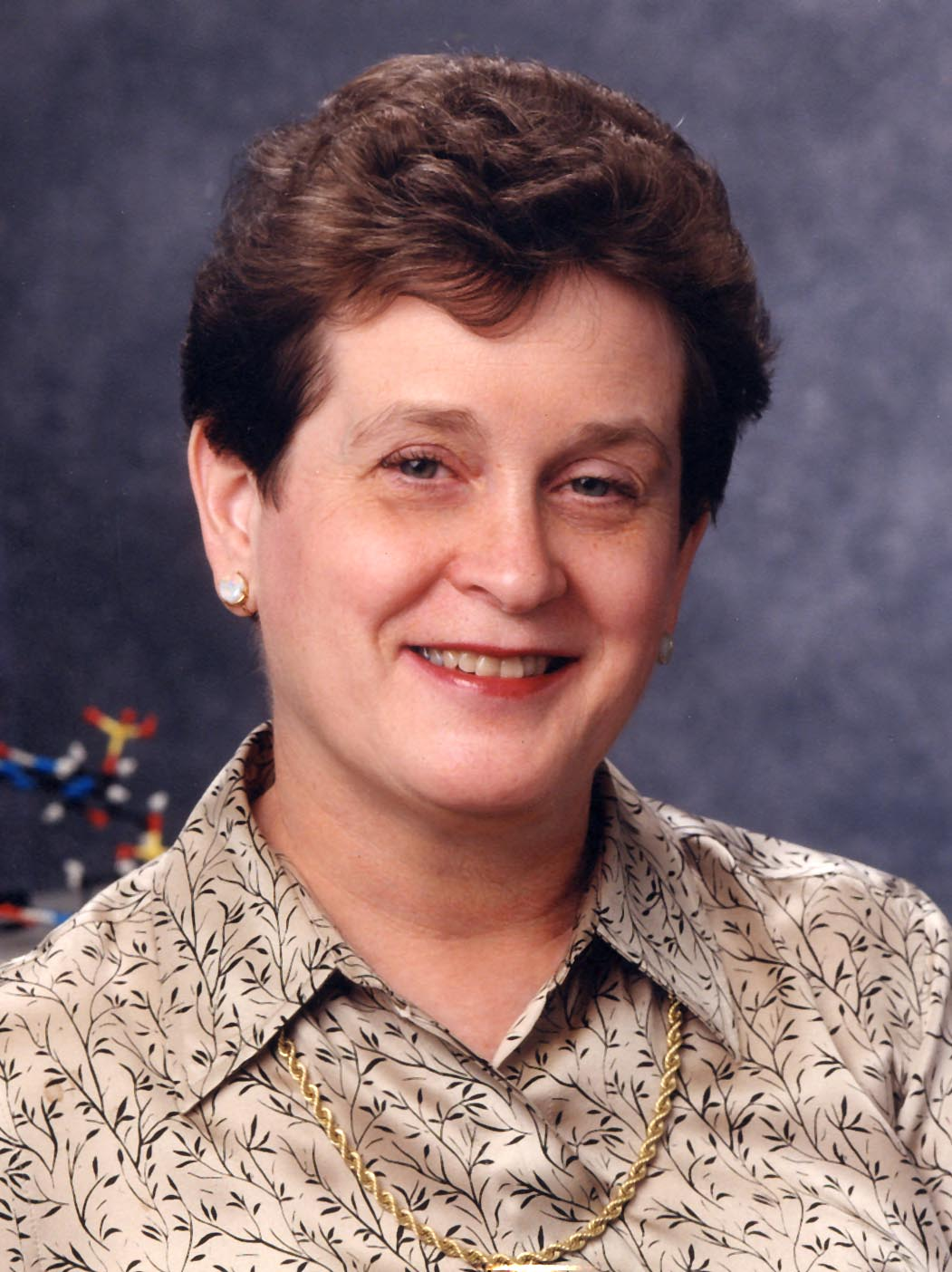
- Education: Stanford University (Ph.D.); University of Delaware (B.S.)
- Scientific career
- Workplaces: Rutgers University
- Thesis: The Configurational Statistics of Polynucleotide Chains (1971)
- Doctoral advisor: Paul J. Flory

Wilma K. Olson (born c. 1945) is the Mary I. Bunting professor at the Rutgers Center for Quantitative Biology (CQB) (formerly known as BioMaPS institute for Quantitative Biology) at Rutgers University. Olson has her own research group on the New Brunswick campus. Although she is a polymer chemist by training, her research aims to understand the influence of chemical architecture on the conformation, properties, and interactions of nucleic acids.

== Education ==
Olson received her bachelor's degree in chemistry at the University of Delaware in 1967, with honors and distinction. During her studies, she received the A.C.S. (Delaware Section) Student Award. Olson obtained her Ph.D. in 1971 at Stanford University, where she studied the configurational statistics of polynucleotide chains. Her advisor was polymer scientist Paul J. Flory, who would win the Nobel Prize in Chemistry in 1974.

== Professional career ==
Olson remained at the Flory group for a post doc research, after which she became a Damon Runyon Cancer Research Foundation Postdoctoral Fellow with geneticist Charles R. Cantor at Columbia University. In 1972, Olson became an assistant professor at Rutgers University and full professor in 1979.

During her time at Rutgers, she was a visiting professor at the University of Basel in Switzerland (1979–1980) and at the Polymer Chemistry Department of the Jilin University in Changchun, China (1981).

Wilma Olson was involved in setting up the nucleic acid database, in collaboration with Helen M. Berman.

== Research ==
Olson's studies DNA as polymers, with atoms and chemical bonds. She studies the interaction between DNA and structural proteins which do not bind to the nuclear bases, but to the phosphorus-sugar backbone, e.g. histones. Also, the energy needed to form circular DNA is investigated. Olson aims to clarify the role of local structure on the overall folding of RNA, for instance the helices and loops in the ribosome. A second goal is to uncover structural details of nucleic acid structural transitions, such as those involving different DNA duplexes. This information helps to design new drugs and materials.

== Awards ==
During her career, Wilma Olson had won many awards, among others:

- Douglass College Medal, 2001
- American Chemical Society – North Jersey Section
- Sister Marian José Smith Excellence in Education Award, 2000
- New Jersey Woman of Achievement Award, 1998
- Wellcome Visiting Professorship, New York University, 1997
- American Women in Science, New York Area Scientist of the Year Award, 1994
- National Lecturer and National Award for Excellence and Leadership in Biophysics, Biophysical Society 1994
- National Institute of General Medical Sciences MERIT Award, 1988–98
- Rutgers University Board of Trustees Research Award, 1993
- Guggenheim Fellowship, 1978
