= E. A. Carmean =

American art historian and museum curator (1945–2019)

- Born: E. A. Carmean Jr. January 25, 1945; Springfield, Illinois, United States
- Died: October 12, 2019 (aged 74); Washington, D.C., United States
- Occupations: Art historian; Curator; Canon
- Spouses: Janet Yantis; Martha Adger; Kathryn Carmean
- Children: 1
- Awards: Guggenheim Fellowship (1978)

Academic background
- Education: MacMurray College; Memphis Theological Seminary

Academic work
- Discipline: Twentieth-century American and European art
- Institutions: National Gallery of Art

Elmer Arthur Carmean Jr. (January 25, 1945 – October 12, 2019) was an American art historian and curator. Carmean focused his studies on twentieth-century American and European modernism in art. Later in his career, he became an Episcopal canon.

== Museum career ==
Born to E.A. Carmean Sr. and Helen Marker in Springfield, Carmean graduated from MacMurray College in 1967 with a Bachelor of Arts in Art History, Philosophy, and Theology. He then went on to do graduate work until 1970 at the University of Illinois in Art History, but did not graduate.

Carmean, a specialist on twentieth-century American and European modernism in art, joined the Museum of Fine Arts, Houston as Curator of Twentieth-Century Art in the year of his graduation, when the museum was led by Philippe de Montebello. Carmean was then hired at the National Gallery of Art in 1974, when under the directorship of J. Carter Brown. Carmean was the founding curator of its Department of Twentieth-Century Art. Four years later, he was awarded a Guggenheim Fellowship. In 1984, Carmean became director of the Modern Art Museum of Fort Worth, and in 1992, the director of the Memphis Brooks Museum of Art for a span of five years.

== Canonical career ==
In 1998, Carmean decided to leave the museum world and study at the Memphis Theological Seminary. In 2002, he joined St. George’s Episcopal Church in Germantown, and three years later, was appointed a lay canon.

Married three times with one daughter, Elizabeth Carmean Adams, Carmean died at the age of seventy-four from cancer in Washington, D.C.

== See also ==
- List of Guggenheim Fellowships awarded in 1978
