= Donald Kouri =

American physicist (1938–2021)

Donald J. Kouri (July 25, 1938 – February 9, 2021) was an American physicist and Cullen Distinguished Professor at the University of Houston. He completed his PhD from University of Wisconsin in 1965.

== Research interest ==
Donald J Kouri carried out research in the fundamental implications of the Heisenberg uncertainty principle and the resulting applications and also generalized coherent states. He has also pioneered the research in quantum theory of atomic collisions and molecular collisions.

He taught and carried out research in Israel and Germany, and participated in international conferences throughout the world. Kouri died on February 9, 2021, at the age of 82.

== Awards ==
- 2010: National Science Foundation's Special Creativity Award
- 1978: Guggenheim Fellowship for Natural Sciences, US & Canada

== Works ==
- Kouri, Donald J (2015) Quantum Scattering Theory. World Scientific Publishing Company
- Kouri, Donald J and Shi, Zhouoer (2001) Lagrange Wavelets for Signal Processing. IEEE
- Kouri, Donald J. (1991). Theoretical studies of molecular collisions. National Aeronautics and Space Administration
