= Angie Estes =

American poet, and professor at Ashland University

- Born: December 12, 1950 (age 75)
- Occupation: Poet

Academic background
- Education: University of Oregon (MA, PhD)

Angie Estes is an American poet, and Professor Emerirta, California Polytechnic State University

She graduated from the University of Oregon with an M.A. and Ph.D. in English. She taught at California Polytechnic State University, Oberlin College, and Ohio State University. Her work has appeared in Boston Review, Paris Review, Ploughshares, and TriQuarterly.

== Awards ==
- James Merrill House Residency 2023
- Kingsley Tufts Poetry Award 2015
- Audre Lorde Award 2014
- Pulitzer Prize finalist, 2010
- Pushcart Prize
- Cecil Hemley Memorial Award, Poetry Society of America
- National Endowment for the Humanities Fellowship
- National Endowment for the Arts Fellowship
- Woodrow Wilson Foundation Fellowship
- California Arts Council Fellowship
- MacDowell Colony residency
- Ohio Arts Council grant
- 2001 FIELD Poetry Prize
- 2001 Alice Fay di Castagnola Prize, from the Poetry Society of America
- 2010 Guggenheim Fellowship

== Works ==
=== Poetry ===
- The Swallows Come Out: Selected Poems 1995-2025, Unbound Edition Press, 2026 ISBN 978-1-968274-02-3
- The Last Day on Earth in the Eternal City, Unbound Edition Press, 2025 ISBN 979-8-9906141-7-8
- Parole, Oberlin College Press, 2018 ISBN 978-0-997-3355-3-8
- Enchantée, Oberlin College Press, 2015 ISBN 978-0-932440-41-9
- Tryst, Oberlin College Press, 2009, ISBN 978-0-932440-35-8
- Chez Nous, Oberlin College Press, 2005, ISBN 978-0-932440-99-0
- Voice-Over, Oberlin College Press, 2002, ISBN 978-0-932440-91-4
- The Uses of Passion, Gibbs Smith, 1995 ISBN 978-0-87905-68-41

=== Anthologies ===
- "Kind of Blue", Cap City Poets, Pudding House Publications, 2008, ISBN 978-1-58998-699-2
- "Now and Again: The Autobiography of Basket", The Extraordinary Tide, Columbia University Press, 2001, ISBN 978-0-231-11963-4
- "Nocturne"; Serenade", Geography of Home, Heyday Books, 1999, ISBN 978-1-890771-19-5
- Queer Dog, Cleis Press, 1997, ISBN 978-1-57344-071-4
