= Robert F. Berkhofer =

American historian (1931–2012)

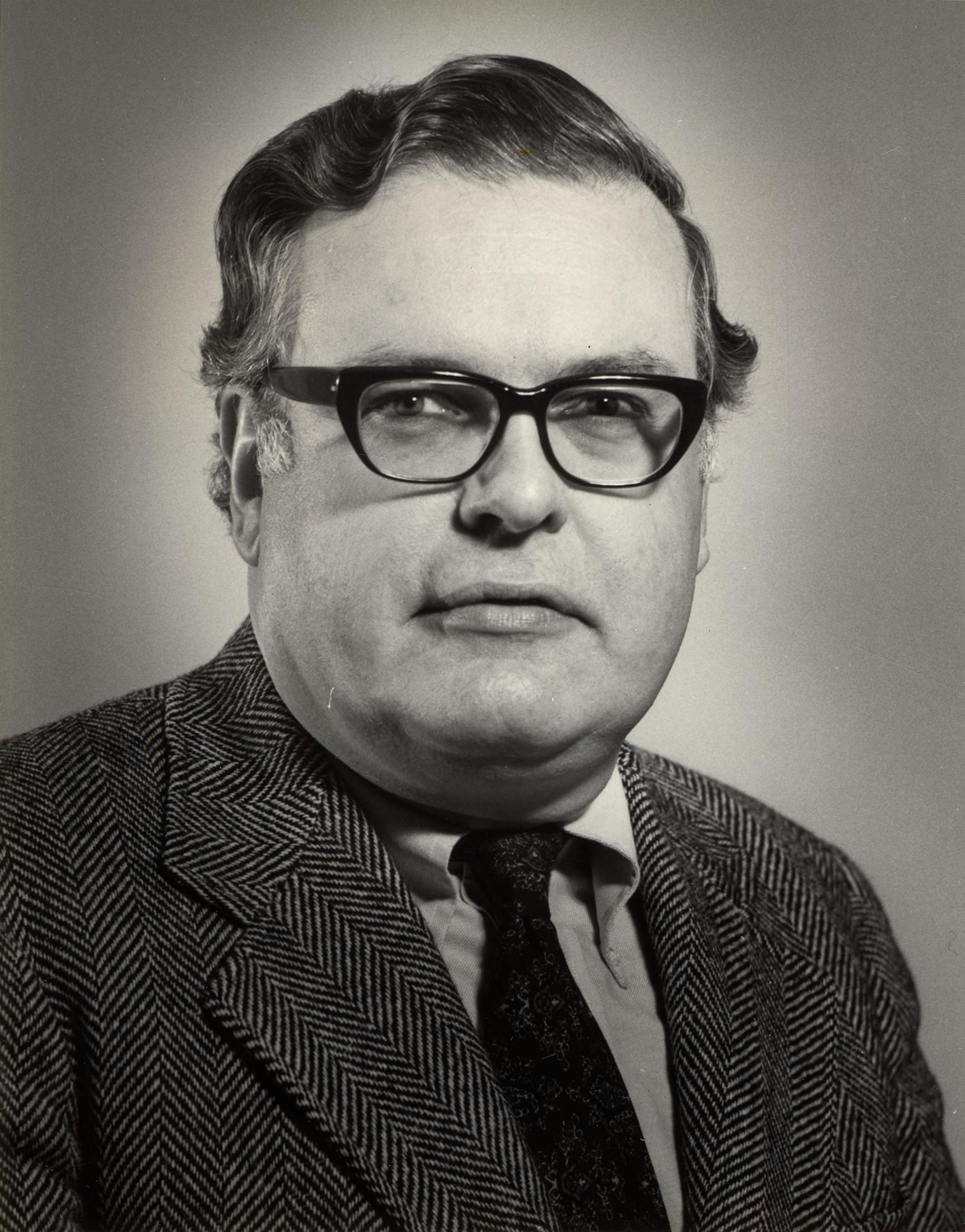
- Berkhofer in 1977
- Born: November 30, 1931; Teaneck, New Jersey, U.S.
- Died: June 25, 2012 (aged 80); Davis, California, U.S.
- Spouse: Genevieve Zito Berkhofer (m. 1962–2007)
- Awards: Guggenheim Fellowship

Academic background
- Education: BA, University at Albany, SUNY; MA, PhD, 1960, Cornell University
- Thesis: Protestant missionaries to the American Indians, 1787 to 1862 (1960)

Academic work
- Institutions: University of California, Santa Cruz; University of Florida; University of Michigan; University of Wisconsin; University of Minnesota; Ohio State University

Robert F. Berkhofer (November 30, 1931 – June 25, 2012) was an American historian. He was a professor of history emeritus at the University of California, Santa Cruz and former president of the American Studies Association.

== Early life and education ==
Berkhofer was born on November 30, 1931, in Teaneck, New Jersey, to Swiss-German parents. The family lived on a dairy farm in Greeneville, New York, where he contracted polio at the age of 13, and was confined to a hospital for one year. On the day Japan surrendered in World War II, his mother released him from the hospital and then spent three years giving him physical therapy at home so he could walk without a brace.

He earned his Bachelor of Arts degree from the University at Albany, SUNY, and his PhD from Cornell University. He completed his graduate degrees under the guidance of Paul Wallace Gates and earned a fellowship at Fort Ticonderoga.

== Career ==
Upon receiving his PhD, Berkhofer spent one academic year at Ohio State University before accepting a position as an assistant professor at the University of Minnesota. He stayed in Minnesota for nine years, where he rose through the academic ranks to associate professor and chair of American studies by 1969. During this time, he also published his first book through the University of Kentucky Press titled Salvation and the Savage: An Analysis of Protestant Missions and American Indian Response, 1787-1862.

Berkhofer left Minnesota in 1969 to accept a professorship position at the University of Wisconsin, during which he published A Behavioral Approach to Historical Analysis. In the book, Berkhofer explained that historians should adapt their discipline by learning from two different groups; social scientists and philosophers of science and history. He also played a role in establishing an undergraduate course focused on American Indian history including tribes and the white man's image of Indians. During the 1973–1974 academic year, Berkhofer received a National Endowment for the Humanities Senior Fellowship to study the "evolving concepts of the American Indian."

Following the publication of his second book, Berkhofer transferred to the University of Michigan (UMich) where he stayed for almost three decades. While there, he received a Guggenheim Fellowship to research United States history and was appointed president of the American Studies Association. Berkhofer also continued his studies into American Indians and published The White Man's Indian: Images of the American Indian from Columbus to the Present in 1978. In this book, he explored the dichotomy between the Colonial concept of the "noble savage" and that of "bloodthirsty heathens", of which only one was considered "worthy of submission." This dichotomy is referred to as the "Berkhofer Duality".

As he grew older and experienced post-polio pains, Berkhofer accepted a one year position at the University of Florida and finally the University of California, Santa Cruz (UCSC). He worked at UCSC from 1991 until 2007, when he chose to retire. Berkhofer died on June 25, 2012, in Davis, California.

== Personal life ==
During his time at the University of Minnesota, Berkhofer became engaged, and married his wife Genevieve (nee Zito) in 1962. Prior to his wife's death in 2007, Berkhofer and Genevieve Zito Berkhofer had one son together.
