= James Maurice Daniels =

Canadian physicist (1924–2016)

James Maurice Daniels (August 26, 1924 – June 12, 2016) was a Canadian physicist, inventor, author, and former university professor. He was a physics professor at the University of British Columbia from 1953 to 1960, then a year as a visiting professor at Instituto de Fisica J.A. Balseiro in Bariloche, Argentina, before becoming a professor of Physics at the University of Toronto. He also served 5 years as Chairman of the department. He retired as Professor Emeritus in the late 1980s to live near Princeton, where he had been a visiting senior researcher in 1984–85.

== Awards and honors ==
Daniels is the inventor in three US patents:

He is the author of the book Oriented Nuclei.

He authored many scientific articles in areas such as nuclear orientation, and applications of Mossbauer spectroscopy to magnetic materials and minerals.
