= Arvada Chorale =

The Arvada Chorale is a community chorus from Arvada, Colorado. The Chorale performs a wide variety of classical, holiday, contemporary, and jazz music. The Chorale was founded in 1977 as a project of the Arvada Center for the Arts and Humanities, and became an independent 501c3 non-profit corporation in 2009. The Arvada Chorale has performed with several prominent musical ensembles from the Denver area, including the Lakewood Symphony, the Rocky Mountain Ringers, and Colcannon. The Chorale is composed of about 70 singers in the SATB arrangement. The role of Music Director for the Fall 2015 season has been taken over by Marla Wasson.
