= Jervis Anderson =

Jamaican-American journalist and biographer

- Born: Jervis Beresford Anderson; October 1, 1932; Jamaica
- Died: December 1999 (aged 67); New York City, US
- Education: New York University
- Occupations: Journalist and author
- Spouse: Eugenia Kemble (m. 1969; div. 1979)

Jervis Beresford Anderson (October 1, 1932 – December 1999) was a Jamaican-born journalist and author best known for his biographies of A. Philip Randolph and Bayard Rustin. Anderson was born in then-British colony Jamaica to Ethlyn Anderson (née Allen) and Peter Anderson. He attended Kingston Technical School, and became a reporter for Jamaican newspaper The Daily Gleaner.

Later, in 1958, he moved to New York to attend New York University, earning a bachelor's degree in 1963 and graduating in 1966 with a master's degree in English. He joined The New Yorker in 1968, and throughout his career there, he wrote many portraits and profiles of notables such as poet Derek Walcott, writer Cornel West, and jazz musician Wynton Marsalis.

He married Eugenia Kemble on September 24, 1969, and they divorced in 1979. He retired from The New Yorker in 1998, but remained active as a writer and scholar. He died in 1999 between Christmas and New Year's at his New York City apartment of natural causes, and his body was found on January 7, 2000.

== Partial bibliography ==
- A. Philip Randolph: A Biographical Portrait. Harcourt Brace Jovanovich. 1973. ISBN 0-15-107830-0.
- Bayard Rustin: Troubles I've Seen. HarperCollins. 1997. ISBN 0-06-016702-5.
- Guns in American Life. Random House. 1984. ISBN 0-394-53598-7.
- This Was Harlem: A Cultural Portrait, 1900–1950. Farrar, Straus and Giroux. 1982. ISBN 0-37-427623-4.
- "Uprootedness". Commentary. August 1965.
- "England in Jamaica: Memories from a Colonial Boyhood". The American Scholar. Vol. 69, no. 2. 2000. pp. 15–30. JSTOR 41212992.
