= Micheline Tison-Braun =

French academic (born 1913)

- Born: Micheline Lucie Tison; 7 April 1913; Arras, France
- Occupation: Academic
- Spouse: Lev Braun (m. 1948, died)
- Awards: Guggenheim Fellowship (1978); Prix Roland-de-Jouvenel (1984); Officier of the Ordre des Palmes Académiques

Academic background
- Education: University of Lille; University of Algiers 1; University of Paris

Academic work
- Discipline: Literary studies; Art history
- Institutions: Institut français du Royaume-Uni; Hunter College; CUNY Graduate Center

Micheline Lucie Tison-Braun (née Tison; born 7 April 1913) is a French academic. Originally a broadcaster for the BBC during World War II, she was originally a teacher at the Institut français du Royaume-Uni and the Lycée Français de Londres before moving to the United States to become a United Nations official. She worked as a full professor at Hunter College and CUNY Graduate Center, as well as a teacher at the Lycée Français de New York and École libre des hautes études.

She wrote several books in fields such as literary studies and art history, including La crise de l'humanisme (1958, 1967), Nathalie Sarraute ou la Recherche de l'authenticité (1971), Tristan Tzara (1977), Poétique du paysage (1980), L'Introuvable origine (1981), Ce monstre incomparable: Malraux ou l'énigme du moi (1983), Marguerite Duras (1985), and Le Moi décapité (1990). She was a 1978 Guggenheim Fellow and won the Prix Roland-de-Jouvenel in 1984.

== Biography ==
Micheline Lucie Tison was born on 7 April 1913 in Arras, daughter of Lucie (née Duchat) and industrialist Eugène Tison, and she attended the Collège de jeunes filles d'Arras. She obtained a licence ès lettres from the University of Lille in 1933, a diplôme d'études supérieures from the University of Algiers 1 in 1935, and an agrégation ès lettres from the University of Paris in 1937.

She worked as a professor at the Institut français du Royaume-Uni and the Lycée Français de Londres from 1937 to 1942. During World War II, she worked for the BBC as a writer and editor for their French-language foreign-service broadcasts. Afterwards, she returned to the Institut français and Lycée Français from 1945 to 1946. She moved to New York City in 1947, where started working at the headquarters of the United Nations that year as a writer and translator. In 1954, she left the UN and joined the Lycée Français de New York as a French professor, before moving to Hunter College in 1960. She joined the CUNY Graduate Center in 1968, and she was promoted in both institutions from associate professor to full professor in 1974. She also worked at the École libre des hautes études as a French professor. In 1970, she obtained a doctorat d'État ès lettres from the University of Paris.

She wrote several books in fields such as literary studies and art history, including the two-volume La crise de l'humanisme (1958, 1967), Nathalie Sarraute ou la Recherche de l'authenticité (1971), Tristan Tzara (1977), Poétique du paysage (1980), L'Introuvable origine (1981), Ce monstre incomparable: Malraux ou l'énigme du moi (1983), and Le Moi décapité (1990). In 1978, she was awarded a Guggenheim Fellowship for "a study on the crisis of personality in French literature from 1890 to 1970". She won the 1984 Prix Roland-de-Jouvenel for Ce monstre incomparable, and she was appointed an Officier of the Ordre des Palmes Académiques. Françoise Dorenlot remarked: "Having never actively sought honors or distinctions, she found that they came to her; and having never cultivated popularity, she is nonetheless surrounded by the affectionate admiration of all—both colleagues and students alike. Undoubtedly, these marks of respect come as no surprise, given the caliber of Professor Tison-Braun’s scholarly work and teaching."

On 1 April 1948, she married Lev Braun, a Czechoslovak broadcaster for Radio Free Europe and the BBC who later became a professor at Fairleigh Dickinson University; they were married until his death. She lived in the Upper West Side.

== Bibliography ==
- La crise de l'humanisme: Le conflit de l'individu et de la société dans la littérature française moderne (1958, 1967) (Note: Reviews of this book:)
- Nathalie Sarraute ou la Recherche de l'authenticité (1971) (Note: Reviews of this book:)
- Dada et Surréalisme (1973)
- Tristan Tzara: Inventeur de l'homme nouveau (1977) (Note: Reviews of this book:)
- Poétique du paysage: Essai sur le genre descriptif (1980) (Note: Reviews of this book:)
- L'Introuvable origine: Le Problème de la personnalité au seuil du XXe siècle: Flaubert, Mallarmé, Rimbaud, Valéry, Bergson, Claudel, Gide, Proust (1981) (Note: Reviews of this book:)
- Ce monstre incomparable: Malraux ou l'énigme du moi (1983) (Note: Reviews of this book:)
- Marguerite Duras (1985) (Note: Reviews of this book:)
- Le Moi décapité: le problème de la personnalité dans la littérature française contemporaine (1990) (Note: Reviews of this book:)
- L'Esprit créateur (1991)
