= Billy McAllister (footballer) =

Scottish footballer

Personal information
- Full name: William McAllister
- Date of birth: c. 1900
- Place of birth: Glasgow, Scotland
- Positions: Inside forward; wing half

Senior career*
Years	Team	Apps	(Gls)
- Milngavie Allander
- Maryhill
- Hamilton Academical
1919–1920	Renton		
1920–1921	St Mirren		
1921	→ Johnstone (loan)		
1921	Ebbw Vale		
1921–1925	Brighton & Hove Albion	89	(6)
1925–1926	Middlesbrough	33	(0)
1926–1927	Queens Park Rangers	26	(1)
1927–1929	Raith Rovers	58	(0)
1929–1930	Heart of Midlothian	1	(0)
1930–1932	Dolphin		
1932–193?	Glentoran		
- * Club domestic league appearances and goals

William McAllister (c. 1900 – after 1932) was a Scottish professional footballer who played as an inside forward or wing half in the Scottish League for Hamilton Academical, St Mirren, Raith Rovers and Heart of Midlothian and in the Football League for Brighton & Hove Albion, Middlesbrough and Queens Park Rangers. He also played for clubs including Milngavie Allander, Maryhill, Renton, Johnstone, Ebbw Vale, Dolphin and Glentoran.
