= Luis Jorge González =

Argentine composer (1936-2016)

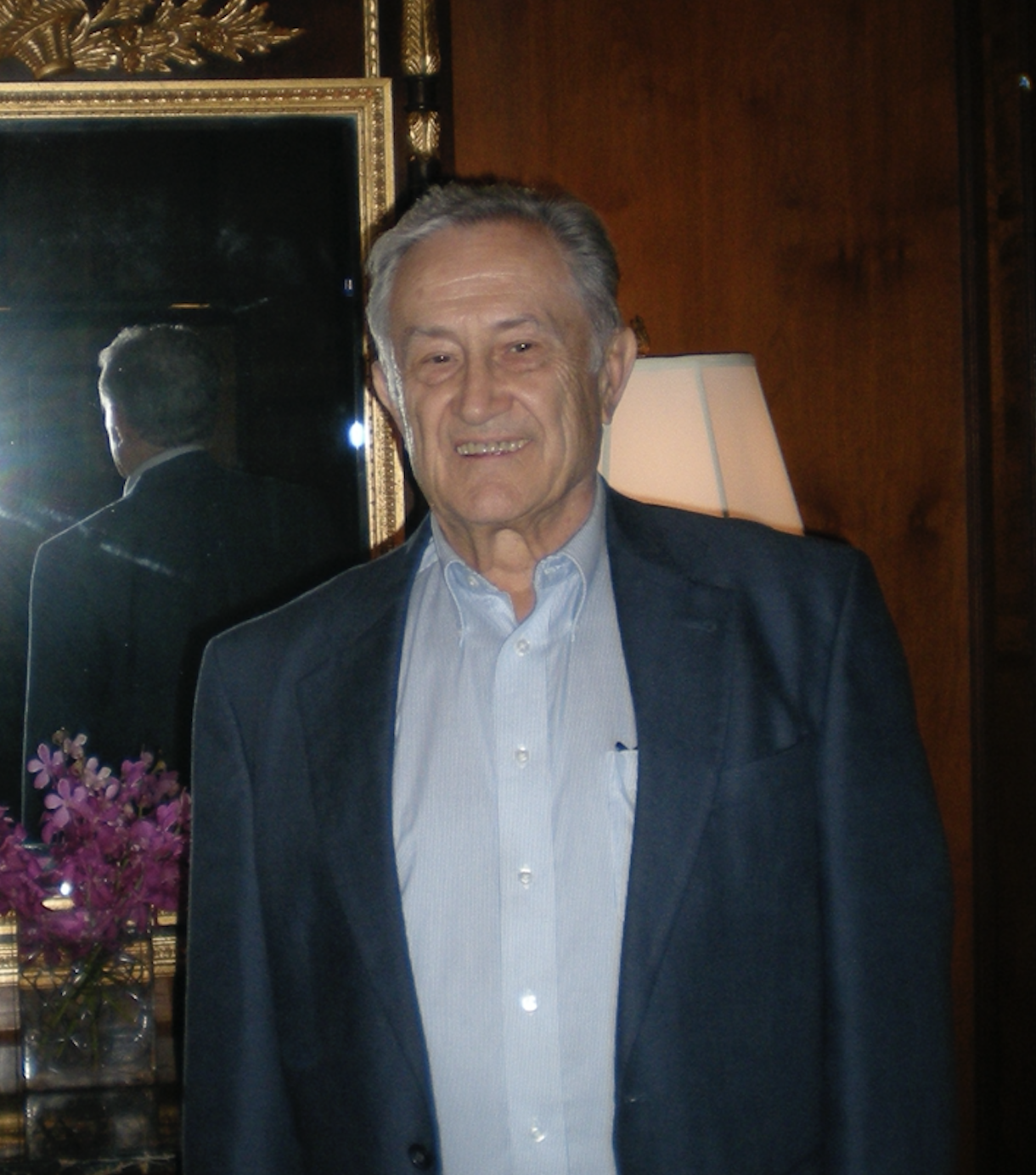
- Born: January 22, 1936; San Juan, Argentina
- Died: February 3, 2016 (aged 80); Longmont, Colorado, USA
- Era: 20th century

Luis Jorge González (January 22, 1936 – February 3, 2016) was an Argentine composer and educator.

== Life ==
Born in San Juan, Argentina, on January 22, 1936, Luis Jorge González (also known as Luis Jorge González Fernández) was a composer and composition teacher. He earned a "Licenciado en Piano, Armonía y Dirección Coral" degree at the Escuela de Música at the Universidad Nacional de Cuyo, in Mendoza, in 1963. He studied composition privately with Austrian musicologist Erwin Leuchter in Buenos Aires between 1957 and 1959, and again later, between 1963 and 1964. After 1965, he taught music theory at Departamento de Música at the Universidad Provincial "Domingo Faustino Sarmiento" in San Juan, and conducted the choir Agrupación Coral Sanjuanina between 1967 and 1969. He was invited to compose the music for the large, annual Fiesta Nacional de la Vendimia (Grape Harvest Festival) in 1968.

González moved to the United States in 1971 and studied composition at the Peabody Institute. He was a student of Earle Brown and Robert Hall Lewis, and completed a Doctor of Musical Arts degree in 1977. In 1978 he received a Guggenheim Fellowship. He returned to San Juan, Argentina, in 1980, and taught music theory and composition at the Universidad Nacional de San Juan between 1980 and 1982. In 1983 he was hired by the College of Music at the University of Colorado Boulder to teach music theory and composition. He taught there until he retired in 2004. He received an Emeritus Professor designation shortly after. He died on February 3, 2016 in Longmont, Colorado.

== Musical works and style ==
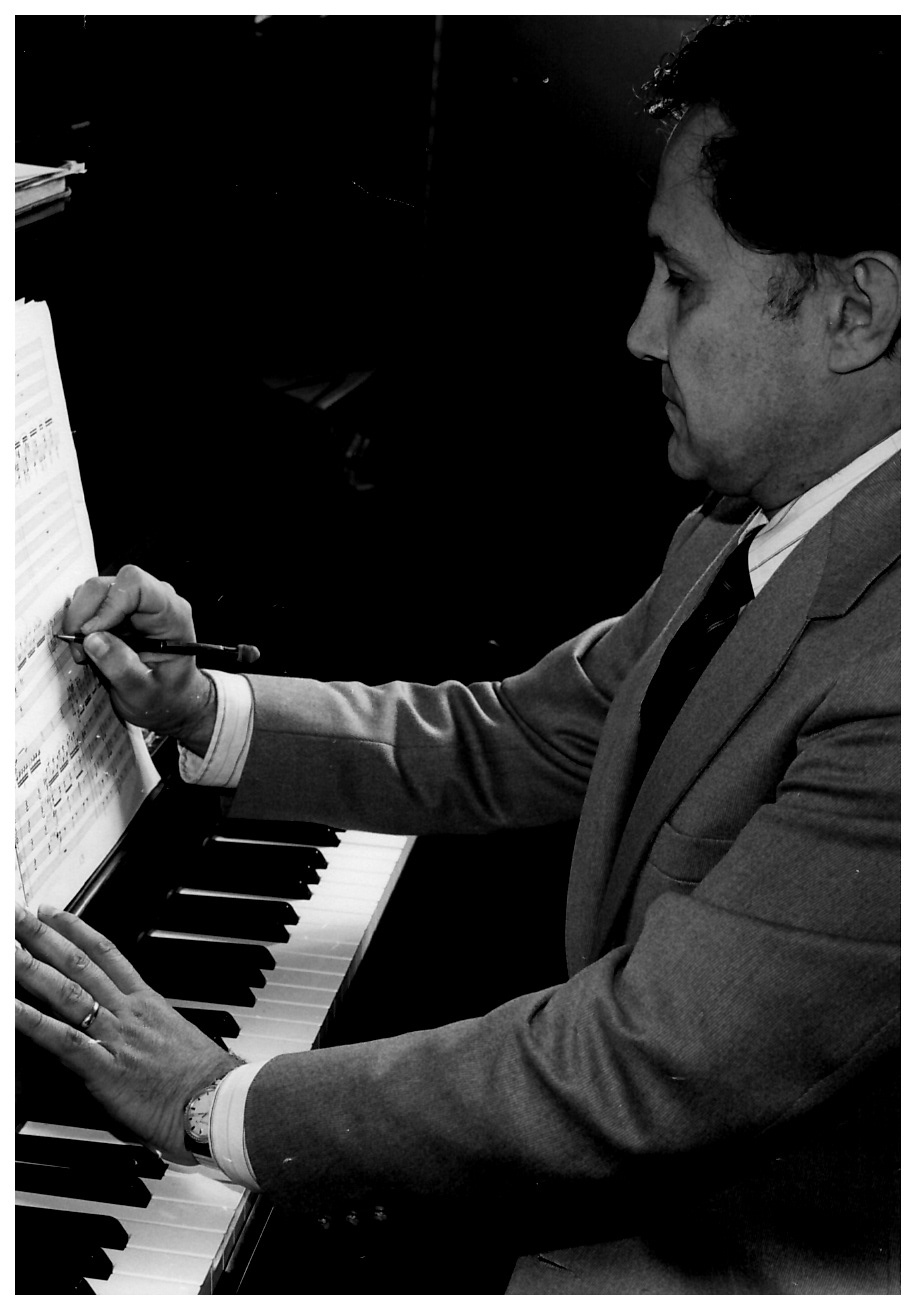
Luis Jorge González in 1982.

González composed works for solo instruments, chamber ensembles, choir and orchestra. According to musicologist Elliott Antokoletz, his works "synthesized divergent traditional and modernistic tendencies thoroughly into personal contemporary idioms." His earlier compositions were written in tonal language with material inspired by Argentine folk music. Later on he transitioned to a more contemporary style, first through the use of twelve-tone techniques and later, during his student years at the Peabody Institute, with elements of experimentalism and the American musical avant-garde trends of the time. During this time he experimented with open and aleatoric forms, electroacoustic music, special musical notation and extended instrumental techniques.

Starting in the late 1970s, González gradually moved away from the musical avant-garde. Many of his works in the 1980s and 1990s, such as Illariy (Alborada) for flute and orchestra, and Inti-Raymi for orchestra, use titles in the Quechuan language, and show an interest in exploring magic realism and themes related to the Indian cultures of South America. Later on, in the late 1990s until his death in 2016, his music gravitated towards the tango genre of Argentina. Most of his works after 2000, such as Tangos del Puerto (2000-2002) for string quartet and Luces de Medianoche (2003-2004) for piano, are almost exclusively inspired by the musical and affective features of tango in a tonal style that is often dark and nostalgic. The tango felt very natural to González; it provided opportunities to develop his interest for minor keys, counterpoint, melodic bass lines, harmonic tension and drama. After 2004 he collaborated closely with pianist Alejandro Cremaschi, who premiered and recorded many of his late solo piano and chamber pieces.

All printed scores and manuscripts of his works, as well as personal correspondence, were donated to the Special Collections of the American Music Research Center at the University of Colorado Boulder in 2016.

== Awards and recognitions ==
His works received many national and international awards, including first prizes at the Composition Competition of the Percussive Arts Society (1975 and 1979), third prize at the Wieniawski Composition Competition, a prize from the Premio di Composizione Sinfonica Cittá di Trieste, Italy (1978), and awards from the Fondo Nacional de las Artes (Argentina), Trinac (Tribuna Nacional de Compositores, Argentina), International Society of Bassists (1997 and 2002). He received a Special Mention from the National Composition Prize in Argentina in 2004. Critic Phillip Scott described González's music "genuine" in a review of the CD Las Puertas del Tiempo in the magazine Fanfare.

== Works ==
=== Piano solo ===
- Zamba (1957)
- Sonatina [No. 1] (1962)
- Soledades Sonoras III (1976)
- Canzona da Sonar (1976)
- Calles de Buenos Aires (1972-1978)
- Sonata del Plata (1990-1991; revised 1993)
- Entre el Vestigio y la Bruma. Suite in four movements (1995)
- Luces de Medianoche (2003-2004)
- Sonatina Estival (2005)
- De Fiestas y Danzas. Suite of Latin American Dances (2005)
- Marquee Lights for a Tango Show (2003-2006)
- Crepúsculos de la Ciudad (2001-2007)
- Otoño Pampeano. Sonatina No. 3 (2013)

== Recordings ==
- Rachel Barton, violin. CD: Capricho Latino. Cedille Records.. Works: Epitalamio tanguero.
- Alejandro Cremaschi and Trio Cordilleras. CD: Las Puertas del Tiempo. Works: Las Puertas del Tiempo (trio), Sonatina Estival, Luces de Medianoche, De Fiestas y Danzas (piano). Released August 11, 2009
- Various artists. CD: Fervor: The Music of Luis Jorge González. Works: Fulgores nocturnos (piano), Beyond departure (trombone and piano), Con fervor por Buenos Aires (voice and piano), Sonata elegíaca (viola and piano). Released June 12, 2012.
- Trio Cordilleras. CD: Tango: Body and Soul. Works: Montage of Hope (violin, cello and piano). Released July 1, 2015.
