= William McAllister-Johnson =

Canadian art historian (1939–2016)

William McAllister-Johnson (1939 – August 23, 2016) was a Canadian scholar and Professor who was a specialist of the history of prints and printmaking, especially in 18th-century France.

== Biography ==
McAllister-Johnson was a professor at the University of Toronto's Department of Art. He authored books and catalogues on art history and many other books, versified prints in 18th-century France, and 19th-century salon-era prints.

McAllister-Johnson was a student of Erwin Panofsky at Princeton University, and co-authored a catalogue on Numismatic Propaganda in Renaissance France for the Detroit Institute of Art in 1968. He was awarded a Guggenheim Fellowship in 1978.

He was a member of the scientific committee of the French journal Nouvelles de l'estampe (French: "News about prints").

== Works ==
Books

- Estienne Jodelle. Le Recueil des Inscriptions, 1558. A Literary and Iconographical Exegesis (1972), co-authored with Victor E. Graham
- La Galerie François Ier au château de Fontainebleau (1972), co-authored
- The Paris Entries of Charles IX and Elisabeth of Austria, 1571. With an Analysis of Simon Bouquet's Bref et sommaire recueil (1974), co-authored with Victor E. Graham
- The Royal Tour of France by Charles IX and Catherine de' Medici: Festivals and Entries 1564-6 (1979), co-authored with Victor E. Graham
- Art History: Its Use and Abuse (1988)
- Hugues-Adrien Joly Garde du Cabinet des Estampes du Roy. Lettres à K.-H. von Heinecken, 1772-1789 (1988)
- Versified Prints: A Literary and Cultural Phenomenon in 18th-century France (2012)
- The Rise and Fall of the Fine Art Print in Eighteenth-Century France (2016)

Exhibition catalogues

- L'École de Fontainebleau (1972); revised as Fontainebleau 1528-1610 (1973), co-authored
- French Lithography: The Restoration Salons, 1817-1824 (1976)
- French Royal Academy of Painting and Sculpture. Engraved Reception Pieces, 1672-1789 (1982)
- L'Estampe en France du XVI au XIXe siècle, co-authored with Blandine Bouret and Madeleine Barbin (1987)
- Les Peintres du roi. Morceaux de réception à l'Académie royale de peinture, 1648-1793 (2000), commissaire, co-authored
