= Jon Loomis =

American poet and writer

- Born: 1959 (age 66–67); Athens, Ohio, U.S.
- Education: Ohio University (BA); University of Virginia (MFA)
- Occupations: Author, professor
- Writing career
- Notable work: Frank Coffin mysteries

Jon Loomis (born 1959) is an American poet and writer. He is a professor of English at the University of Wisconsin-Eau Claire. Vanitas Motel (1998), his first book of poetry, won the 1997 annual FIELD prize in poetry. He is also the author of the Frank Coffin mysteries set in Provincetown, Massachusetts, High Season (2007) and Mating Season (2009), both published by St. Martin's Minotaur. The third book in the series, Fire Season, was released on July 17, 2012.

== Life ==
Loomis was born in 1959 in Athens, Ohio. He holds a BA in creative writing from Ohio University (1981), and a Master of Fine Arts in poetry from the University of Virginia where he studied under the poet Charles Wright. He has been the recipient of grants, fellowships and residencies from the Ohio Arts Council, the Virginia Commission for the Arts, the Fine Arts Work Center in Provincetown, the University of Wisconsin-Madison's Creative Writing Institute, and Yaddo, among others. He lives with his wife and two thousand children in west-central Wisconsin.

== Bibliography ==
=== Poetry ===
- Vanitas Motel (Oberlin College Press, 1998)
- The Pleasure Principle (Oberlin College Press, 2001)
- The Mansion of Happiness (Oberlin College Press, 2016)

=== Novels ===
- High Season (2007)
- Mating Season (2009)
- Fire Season (2012)
