= Dennis Schmitz =

American poet (1937–2019)

Dennis Schmitz (August 11, 1937 – September 12, 2019) was an American poet.

== Life ==
Dennis Schmitz grew up in Dubuque, Iowa. He graduated from Loras College and the University of Chicago, where he met and married Loretta D'Agostino in 1960; they have five children together. He has taught at Illinois Institute of Technology, University of Wisconsin–Milwaukee and California State University, Sacramento. His former students include Raymond Carver, Charlene Ungstad, Gary Short, and Gary Thompson.

He opposes the death penalty and protests executions in California every time they take place.

His work has appeared in the Alaska Quarterly Review, American Poetry Review, The Nation, Paris Review, the Chicago Review, and Zyzzyva.

He resided in Sacramento.

== Awards ==
- 2000–2002 Poet Laureate of Sacramento, California
- 1987–1988 Shelley Memorial Award
- 1978 Guggenheim Fellow
- 1976–1977, 1985–1986, 1992–1993 Fellow, National Endowment for the Arts

== Works ==
=== Poetry ===
- Our Music (Gunpowder Press, 2022)
- Animism (Oberlin College Press, 2014)
- The Truth Squad (Copper Canyon Press, 2002)
- About Night: Selected and New Poems (Oberlin College Press, 1993)
- Eden (University of Illinois Press, 1989)
- Singing (Ecco Press, 1985)
- String (Ecco Press, 1980)
- Goodwill, Inc (1976)
- Double Exposures (1971)
- We Weep for Our Strangeness (1969)

=== Editor ===
- The Sacramento Anthology of 100 Poems. Sacramento’s Poet Laureate Program; Sacramento Metropolitan Arts Commission.
