= Sound of the Rockies =

Men's a cappella choir in Colorado, US

- Origin: Denver, Colorado
- Genres: Barbershop music
- Years active: 1999–present
- Website: Official Site

The Sound of the Rockies (SOR) is an a cappella men's chorus based in greater Denver, Colorado. They are a multiple-time bronze medalist chorus for the Barbershop Harmony Society. In 2007, they co-hosted the International Convention in Denver with the Denver Mountainaires. The chorus comprises between 90 and 100 voices currently.

== History ==
In the 1990s, there were two major chapters of the Barbershop Harmony Society in the Denver area, the older Mile-Hi Chapter (chartered 1948) and the Denver Tech Chapter, chartered in the 1980s. In 1999 the two chapters began to discuss the idea of merging and the merger was completed on January 1, 2000. The new chorus, now named the Sound of the Rockies, drafted a young director, Darin Drown, for its initial leadership.

The chorus competed in its first Rocky Mountain District contest in the fall of 2000 in Rapid City, South Dakota, placing second, missing an invitation to the International competition merely by 5 points.

In the fall of 2001 SOR competed in its second District contest, again placing second, but this time earning a wildcard to compete at the International Chorus Finals. Traveling to its first International contest in July 2002, in Portland, Oregon, SOR shocked the barbershop world by placing 8th. The original Mile-Hi Chorus had been a top ten contender back in the 70s, so this marked a return to the upper echelon for the men from Denver.

The new Sound of the Rockies won its first Rocky Mountain District championship in the fall of 2002 once again earning the right to compete at the International contest in July 2003 and placing 7th in Montreal.

The chorus continued its climb, repeating as local Rocky Mountain District champions and placing in the top ten nationally every year. In 2007, the chorus co-hosted the International contest and convention in Denver, the first time the Society's annual convention had ever come to the Mile High City. At the Pepsi Center the Sound of the Rockies placed 3rd, winning a medal (Top 5) for the first time.

Over the next several years SOR would continue its streak as Rocky Mountain District chorus champions and in 2016 won its 15th District Competition in a row. The chorus also continued to medal each year it competed at the International competition. In 2012 SOR skipped the International competition, choosing instead to travel to Harmony University in St. Joseph, Missouri, the Barbershop Harmony Society's week-long summer college for coaching and musical improvement. In doing so, SOR became the first Society chorus to attend the school en masse, thus starting a trend among other choruses which continues today.

Darin Drown announced his intention to step down as director after the 2014 contest and the search began for a new leader. At the final contest with Drown directing the chorus performed a pirate-themed package, setting the audience afire and earning the chorus its highest score yet, averaging 92.8%.

In January 2015 Mark Hale took over as the SOR director. Hale brought with him a wealth of experience as both the International Quartet Champion lead singer of Michigan Jake and the four-time gold medal-winning director of the Masters of Harmony chorus of Los Angeles.

Immediately Hale began transforming the SOR sound and the push for excellence accelerated. In the debut competition (Nashville 2016) with Hale directing the chorus medaled once again, placing fifth in one of the most competitive chorus contests ever. The chorus placed sixth the following year in Las Vegas, Nevada in 2017, fourth in Orlando, Florida in 2018, and sixth in Salt Lake City in 2019. Hale departed as music director in 2022, and Tyler Wigginton took the helm as the newest musical director of the chorus.

== Discography ==
- Colorado My Home (2012)
Tracks

- "Colorado My Home"
- "Everything's Coming Up Roses Medley"
- "Fanfare For The Common Man"
- "Forty-Second Street"
- "The Gift To Be Simple"
- "An American Trilogy"
- "Aquarius"
- "The Music Of The Night"
- "The Rhythm Of Life"
- "The Impossible Dream"
- "Sit Down You're Rockin' The Boat"
- "One Day More"
- "Nearer My God To Thee"

- Sing We Noel (Recorded Live, 2007)
Tracks

- "Happy Holiday / Holiday Season"
- "Sing We Noel"
- "Mr. Grinch" (NeXus)
- "Spaseniye Sodelal"
- "One More Sleep Till Christmas" (Fastlane)
- "Santa Medley"
- "Mary Had A Baby" (Ignition!)
- "The Christmas Song" (Ensemble)
- "Birthday Of A King"
- "Rockin' Christmas Medley"
- "Rudolph the Red-Nosed Reindeer"
- "That's What I Want For Christmas" (NeXus)
- "Betelehemu"
- "My Birthday Comes On Christmas" (Kowalski Twins)
- "Feliz Navidad"
- "The Holly And The Ivy" (Ignition!)
- "It's The Most Wonderful Time Of The Year"
- "Silent Night"
- "Happy Holiday / Holiday Season Reprise"

- Joy In My Soul (2006)
Tracks

- "When I Lift Up My Head"
- "I'm Gonna Sing Till The Spirit Moves In My Heart"
- "Deep River"
- "Gospel Medley" (NeXus)
- "Amazing Grace"
- "Beautiful Savior"
- "Goodbye World, Goodbye"
- "I'll Fly Away" (Ignition!)
- "I'm Feeling Fine"
- "America The Beautiful"
- "There's Gonna Be The Devil To Pay" (Storm Front)
- "Great Day"
- "Tribute To World Peace"

- Goodness & Light (2005)
Tracks

- "Happy Holiday / Holiday Season"
- "The Holly & The Ivy"
- "Ave Maria"
- "Betelehemu"
- "Mary Had A Baby" (Ignition!)
- "The First Hanukkah"
- "I Wonder As I Wander"
- "50 Kilowatt Tree" (Nexus)
- "This Christmas Day"
- "O Holy Night" (Storm Front)
- "What Are You Doing New Year's Eve?"
- "Let It Snow" (Denver A Cappella Project)
- "Do You Hear What I Hear?"
- "God Rest Ye Merry Gentlemen"

- Sound of the Rockies (2002)
Tracks

- "Waiting For The Robert E. Lee"
- "Brother, Can You Spare A Dime?"
- "Great Day"
- "Ave Maria"
- "How To Build A Chorus"
- "Broken-Hearted Medley"
- "The Pirate Song"
- "Bring Him Home"
- "Ya' Got Trouble"
- "America The Beautiful"
- "Armed Forces Medley"
- "Star Spangled Banner"

== Awards and recognition ==
| Year | Award | Contest | Location and Date |
|---|---|---|---|
| 2018 | 4th Place Bronze Medalists | Barbershop Harmony Society International Competition | Orlando, Florida; July 6, 2016 |
| 2017 | 6th Place | Barbershop Harmony Society International Competition | Las Vegas, Nevada; July 7, 2017 |
| 2016 | 5th Place Bronze Medalists | Barbershop Harmony Society International Competition | Nashville, Tennessee; July 8, 2016 |
| 2002 - 2016 | 15 - Time Rocky Mountain District Chorus Champion | Rocky Mountain District Chorus Contest | Various |
| 2014 | 4th Place Bronze Medalists | Barbershop Harmony Society International Competition | Las Vegas, Nevada; July 4, 2014 |
| 2013 | 4th Place Bronze Medalists | Barbershop Harmony Society International Competition | Toronto, Ontario; July 5, 2013 |
| 2011 | 3rd Place Bronze Medalists (tied) | Barbershop Harmony Society International Competition | Kansas City, Missouri; July 8, 2011 |
| 2010 | 4th Place Bronze Medalists | Barbershop Harmony Society International Competition | Philadelphia, Pennsylvania; July 2, 2010 |
| 2009 | 4th Place Bronze Medalists | Barbershop Harmony Society International Competition | Anaheim, California; July 3, 2009 |
| 2008 | 4th Place Bronze Medalists | Barbershop Harmony Society International Competition | Nashville, Tennessee; July 4, 2008 |
| 2007 | 3rd Place Bronze Medalists | Barbershop Harmony Society International Competition | Denver, Colorado; July 6, 2007 |
| 2006 | 6th Place International Finalists | Barbershop Harmony Society International Competition | Indianapolis, Indiana; July 7, 2006 |
| 2005 | 7th Place International Finalists | Barbershop Harmony Society International Competition | Salt Lake City, Utah; July 9, 2005 |
| 2004 | 6th Place International Finalists | SPEBSQSA International Competition | Louisville, Kentucky; July 3, 2004 |
| 2003 | 7th Place International Finalists | SPEBSQSA International Competition | Montreal, Quebec; July 5, 2003 |
| 2002 | 8th Place International Finalists | SPEBSQSA International Competition | Portland, Oregon; July 6, 2002 |
| 2001 | 2nd Place District Chorus - International Wildcard Competitor | Rocky Mountain District Chorus Contest | Greeley, Colorado; September 29, 2001 |
| 2000 | 2nd Place District Chorus | Rocky Mountain District Chorus Contest | Rapid City, South Dakota; October 7, 2000 |

== Youth Chorus ==
In early 2006, the chapter began discussing the idea of creating a young men's chorus within the ranks. This idea took off when the Barbershop Harmony Society introduced a new International Youth Chorus Festival, to be held at the 2008 Midwinter Convention. In August 2008, the group was assembled, and the name 52Eighty was agreed upon. SOR assistant directors Chris Vaughn and Matt Swann were appointed to co-direct the young group. They attended the second annual Youth Chorus Festival in January 2009 in Pasadena, CA and came away with the plateau AA championship and second place overall, averaging a 76.1%. In January 2010, they attended the 3rd annual contest in Tampa, FL and walked away as Grand Champions, with a record-breaking 83.5% average score. Subsequent years have seen a continuation of 52Eighty with a greater focus on recruitment of younger (high school) membership.
