= Field (magazine) =

Field: Contemporary Poetry and Poetics
- Fall 2009 cover
- Categories: Literary magazine
- Frequency: Biannual
- Publisher: Oberlin College Press
- Founded: 1969
- Website: www.oberlin.edu/ocpress/field.html
- ISSN: 0015-0657
- OCLC: 1569147

Field magazine (stylized as FIELD) was a twice-yearly literary magazine published by Oberlin College Press in Oberlin, Ohio, and focusing on contemporary poetry and poetics.

Field has published spring and fall issues each year since its founding in 1969. Contributors have included Adrienne Rich, Charles Wright, Thomas Lux, and Franz Wright.

Field ceased publication in spring 2019.
