= Oberlin College Press =

University press

- Parent company: Oberlin College
- Defunct: 2023
- Country of origin: United States
- Headquarters location: Oberlin, Ohio
- Distribution: University of Chicago Press
- Publication types: Books
- Official website: www2.oberlin.edu/ocpress/default.html

Oberlin College Press was a university press associated with Oberlin College, located in Oberlin, Ohio. The press was chiefly a publisher of poetry compilations and anthologies; it also published the literary periodical Field. The press's last release was Sharon Dolin's translation of Gemma Gorga's Book of Minutes.

Works issued by Oberlin College Press are distributed by the University of Chicago Press's Chicago Distribution Center.

== See also ==
- List of English-language book publishing companies
- List of university presses
