= List of new-age music artists =

This is a list of new-age music artists with articles on Wikipedia.

New-age music is broadly defined as relaxing, even "meditative", music that is primarily instrumental. Unlike relaxing forms of classical music, new-age music makes greater use of electronica and non-Western instrumentation. There is some debate on what can be considered "new-age music"; for example several musicians in Celtic music or Smooth jazz have expressed annoyance at being labeled "new-age musicians". For more on that debate, see the article on new-age music. In addition, several musicians object to the label because they fear it implies a connection to the New Age movement.

== A ==
- Philip Aaberg – pianist
- William Ackerman – guitarist
- Acoustic Alchemy -band
- Paul Adams – guitarist and multi-instrumentalist
- Adiemus – band
- AeTopus – project by composer/producer Bryan Tewell Hughes
- Omar Akram – composer, pianist
- Azam Ali – singer, songwriter
- Alpha Wave Movement – composer, synthesizer music
- Amethystium – band
- Ancient Future – World music band
- Darol Anger – violinist, composer
- Romina Arena – vocals, composer, songwriter, producer, piano, violin, guitar
- David Arkenstone – composer
- Diane Arkenstone – composer, pianist, keyboardist
- Armik – flamenco guitarist
- Can Atilla – pianist, songwriter, violinist
- Australis – composer, producer
- Paul Avgerinos – composer, producer
- Ayana – singer, songwriter

== B ==
- B-Tribe – a Spanish trio
- Emily Bear – pianist, composer
- Hennie Bekker – pianist, composer
- Benise – flamenco guitarist
- Thomas Bergersen – composer
- Daniel Berthiaume – composer, guitar and keyboards
- Biddu – vocalist, music producer
- Tim Blake – keyboardist
- Jo Blankenburg – composer, pianist
- Blue Stone – band
- Moya Brennan – composer, singer
- Thom Brennan – composer
- Jim Brickman – pianist
- Peter Buffett -pianist, composer
- Markus Burger – pianist, composer
- John Burke – pianist
- Richard Burmer – composer, keyboardist
- Ray Buttigieg – composer

== C ==
- Wendy Carlos – composer, keyboardist
- Stephen Caudel – composer, guitarist, keyboardist, arranger
- Celtic Woman – band
- Ceredwen – duo
- Sheila Chandra
- Craig Chaquico – guitarist
- Checkfield – duo, composer, guitarist, keyboardist
- Suzanne Ciani – composer, pianist
- Clannad – band
- Michael Colina – composer, producer, pianist, keyboardist, engineer
- Al Conti – composer, pianist, keyboardist
- Jesse Cook – flamenco guitarist
- Randy and Pamela Copus – duo known as 2002
- Corciolli – composer, musician
- Coyote Oldman – band
- Michael Cretu – composer, MIDI keyboard, guitar
- Cusco – band
- CFCF

== D ==
- Dadawa
- Scott D. Davis – pianist, composer
- Alex De Grassi – American Grammy Award-nominated fingerstyle guitarist
- Deep Forest – band
- Delerium
- Constance Demby – composer, multi-instrumentalist
- Deuter – composer, multi-instrumentalist
- Thomas Di Leva – singer, guitarist, keyboardist, harmonica, drummer, peace activist, composer
- Julius Dobos – composer
- Suzanne Doucet – composer, multi-instrumentalist
- Catherine Duc – composer, pianist/keyboardist
- Kyle Bobby Dunn – composer, arranger, performer
- Chinmaya Dunster – sarod

== E ==
- Ludovico Einaudi – composer, pianist
- Levente Egry – composer, pianist
- Elements – band consisting of ex members of the Pat Metheny Group
- Emerald Web – musical project
- Marc Enfroy – composer, songwriter
- Enigma – musical project by Michael Cretu
- Enya – singer, composer
- Era – musical project
- Erwilian – band
- Esteban
- Dean Evenson – flautist, keyboardist, composer
- Roger Evernden – composer, pianist

== F ==
- Ryan Farish – composer, multi-instrumentalist
- Larry Fast
- Alex Fox – flamenco guitarist
- Christopher Franke – keyboardist
- Eloy Fritsch – composer
- Edgar Froese – composer, guitarist, keyboardist
- Fortuna – singer-songwriter
- Michael Flatley

== G ==
- Gandalf – composer, multi-instrumentalist
- Jan Garbarek – composer, saxophonist
- Tim Gemmill – composer, multi-instrumentalist, producer
- Lisa Gerrard – vocalist, composer, yangqinist
- David & Steve Gordon – recording duo, producers
- Govi – composer, multi-instrumentalist
- Francis Goya – guitarist
- Gregorian – band
- Nicholas Gunn – flautist, multi-instrumentalist, recording artist, composer, producer

== H ==
- John Hackett – composer, flautist, member of Symbiosis
- Jean Ven Robert Hal – composer, synthesizer player, keyboardist
- Steven Halpern – Grammy-nominated recording artist and proponent of music therapy
- Paul Hardcastle – composer, synthesizer player, guitarist
- Michael Allen Harrison – composer, pianist, songwriter
- Fiona Joy Hawkins – pianist
- Michael Hedges – composer, guitarist
- Scott Helland – composer, guitarist
- Barbara Higbie – pianist, violinist, composer, singer, songwriter
- Steve Hillage
- Himekami
- Michael Hoppé – composer
- Paul Horn – flautist
- Yoshiaki Hoshi – composer, synthesizer player, and founder of the group Himekami

== I ==
- Iasos – composer, keyboardist, synthesizer player
- Ralf Illenberger – guitarist, keyboardist
- Mark Isham – composer, synthesist

== J ==
- Steve Jansen – composer, drummer, keyboardist
- Jean-Michel Jarre – composer
- Karl Jenkins – composer
- Theo Jörgensmann – composer, basset clarinetist
- Bradley Joseph – composer, pianist, keyboardist
- William Joseph – pianist, composer
- Prem Joshua – composer

== K ==
- Kerani – composer, arranger
- Karunesh – composer
- Peter Kater – composer, songwriter, pianist
- Kevin Kern – composer, pianist
- Al Gromer Khan – composer, sitar player
- Kitarō – composer
- Bernward Koch – pianist, composer
- Kokia (singer) – singer, songwriter
- Kokin Gumi – music group
- Darlene Koldenhoven – vocalist, keyboardist, songwriter
- Tetsuya Komuro – composer, pianist
- Ron Korb – composer, flutist, songwriter
- Andrei Krylov – composer, guitarist, keyboardist, flutist

== L ==
- Lara & Reyes – flamenco guitarists
- Fariborz Lachini – composer, pianist
- David Lanz – composer, pianist
- Caroline Lavelle - cellist, composer
- Leah - singer, pianist, keyboardist, composer
- Nolwenn Leroy – singer, songwriter, multi-instrumentalist
- Lesiëm – musical project by German producers Sven Meisel and Alex Wende
- Lia – singer, songwriter
- Ottmar Liebert – flamenco guitarist
- Lorie Line – composer, pianist
- Johannes Linstead – flamenco guitarist
- Helen Jane Long – composer, pianist
- Oscar Lopez – flamenco guitarist
- Ray Lynch – composer, musician, producer
- Lisa Lynne – composer, harpist

== M ==
- Mannheim Steamroller – group (leader: Chip Davis)
- Michael Manring – electric bassist, composer
- Catya Maré – songwriter, violinist
- Giovanni Marradi – pianist, composer
- Mars Lasar -German keyboardist and composer
- Vasco Martins – symphonic composer, pianist, guitarist, electronic keyboards
- Keiko Matsui – pianist
- Lyle Mays – composer, pianist
- Paul McCandless – composer, woodwind player
- Loreena McKennitt – singer, musician, composer, producer
- Stephan Micus – composer, multi-instrumentalist, singer
- Miten
- Mithoon – film composer
- Alain Morisod – pianist
- Mythos – Bob D'Eith (piano and producer) and Paul Schmidt (guitar)
- Robert ÆOLUS Myers – composer, performer, producer

== N ==
- Nightnoise
- Michael Nyman – composer

== O ==
- Patrick O'Hearn – keyboardist, composer
- Mike Oldfield – composer, guitarist
- Terry Oldfield – composer
- Opafire – musical project
- Oregon – ethnic jazz band (leaders: Ralph Towner and Paul McCandless)
- Thomas Otten

== P ==
- Jeff Pearce – guitar and Chapman Stick
- Deva Premal – musician, singer
- David Parsons – composer

== R ==
- Jaimin Rajani – singer-songwriter
- Raphael – ambient composer, musician
- Jorge Reyes – Mexican ethnic fusions
- Riopy - French-British pianist, composer, handpans, ambient binaural beats
- Laza Ristovski – keyboardist, composer
- Lawson Rollins – flamenco guitarist
- Rondò Veneziano – chamber orchestra
- Ron Roy – producer, director, composer, arranger
- Nancy Rumbel – ocarina, oboe, English horn, keyboards
- Terje Rypdal – guitarist, composer

== S ==
- Ryuichi Sakamoto – composer, pianist
- Jon Schmidt – pianist, composer
- Klaus Schulze – keyboardist, composer, drummer
- Secret Garden – duo consisting of Fionnuala Sherry and Rolf Løvland
- SEAY – composer, recording artist, vocalist
- Jonn Serrie
- Shadowfax
- Shahin & Sepehr (Shahin Shahida and Sepehr Haddad) – flamenco guitarists
- Dechen Shak-Dagsay – vocalist
- Ananda Shankar – musician
- Oliver Shanti & Friends – band
- Rabbi Shergill – singer, songwriter, guitarist
- Yoko Shimomura – composer, pianist
- Michael Shrieve
- Singh Kaur – singer, composer
- Montana Skies – cello, guitar
- Snatam Kaur – singer, multi-instrumentalist
- Cadence Spalding – singer, composer
- Chris Spheeris – composer
- Gary Stadler – recording artist
- Michael Stearns – composer, keyboardist
- Liz Story – pianist, composer
- Strunz & Farah (Jorge Strunz and Ardeshir Farah) – flamenco guitarists
- Andy Summers – composer, guitarist
- David Sylvian – composer, guitarist, keyboardist
- Symbiosis – band (UK)
- Dinesh Subasinghe – composer, violinist, ancient Ravanahatha performer, multi-instrumentalist
- Laura Sullivan – composer, pianist
- Sumanth – composer
- Stars Over Foy – composer, dj

== T ==
- Tangerine Dream – band
- Team Rockit – Swedish band
- Irv Teibel – field recordist, electronic musician
- John Tesh – pianist, composer
- The Piano Guys – band, piano and cello
- Jennifer Thomas – pianist, composer
- Robert Scott Thompson – composer, recording artist
- Tingstad and Rumbel
- Isao Tomita – composer, keyboardist
- Toshi – vocalist, ex-lead singer of Japanese metal band X Japan
- Kathryn Toyama – composer, pianist

== V ==
- Vangelis – composer
- Luis Villegas – flamenco guitarist
- Vision Eternel – band
- Ad Visser – Dutch composer
- Andreas Vollenweider – harpist, composer

== W ==
- Rick Wakeman – keyboardist, composer
- Billy Joe Walker, Jr. – guitarist
- Kit Watkins -keyboardist
- Wavestar – band
- Hayley Westenra – vocals, piano, violin, guitar
- Chuck Wild – composer, keyboardist, producer of the Liquid Mind album series
- Stuart Wilde – producer, lyricist
- Willie and Lobo (Willie Royal and Wolfgang "Lobo" Fink) – flamenco duo (guitar & violin)
- George Winston – pianist
- Paul Winter – soprano saxophonist, composer
- Erik Wøllo – composer, guitarist
- Danny Wright – pianist
- David Wright – keyboardist, composer

== Y ==
- Akira Yamaoka – composer, producer
- Yanni – composer, pianist, keyboardist
- Yiruma – composer, pianist, producer
- Kim Yoon – pianist
- David Young – composer, flautist
- Young & Rollins – flamenco guitarists

== Z ==
- Gheorghe Zamfir – pan flute
- Zamora – composer, pianist/keyboardist
- Zingaia
- Ralph Zurmühle – composer, pianist

== See also ==
- New Flamenco
