= Elizabeth Butler =

Elizabeth Butler may refer to:

- Elizabeth Thompson (1846–1933), British painter who married lieutenant general Sir William Butler
- Elizabeth Beardsley Butler (1885–1911), social investigator of the Progressive Era
- Elizabeth Golcher Butler (1831–1906), Most Worthy Grand Matron of the Order of the Eastern Star
- Elizabeth Butler, Countess of Desmond (c. 1585–1625), Countess of Desmond and Lady Dingwall
- Elizabeth Butler, Countess of Ormond (1332–1390), wife of Irish peer James Butler, 2nd Earl of Ormond
- Elizabeth Butler, Duchess of Ormond (1615–1684)
- Elizabeth Butler, Marchioness of Ormonde (1856–1928)
- Eliza Marian Butler (1885–1959), English scholar of German
- Elizabeth Butler-Sloss, Baroness Butler-Sloss (born 1933), English judge
- Elizabeth Stanhope, Countess of Chesterfield (1640–1665), née Butler
- Betsy Butler (born 1963), American politician
- Elizabeth Butler, Countess of Derby, English court official
- Elizabeth Butler (musician) (born 1960), American singer-songwriter and musician

== See also ==
- Betty Butler (disambiguation)
