= Tranquilizer (album) =

2025 studio album by Oneohtrix Point Never

Studio album by Oneohtrix Point Never
- Released: November 21, 2025
- Genres: Electronic; plunderphonics; ambient; new age
- Length: 58:26
- Label: Warp
- Producers: Daniel Lopatin; Nathan Salon

Oneohtrix Point Never chronology
| Again (2023) | Tranquilizer (2025) |

Singles from Tranquilizer
- 1. "For Residue" / "Bumpy" / "Lifeworld" Released: October 20, 2025; 2. "Measuring Ruins" Released: October 27, 2025; 3. "Cherry Blue" Released: November 3, 2025; 4. "D.I.S." Released: November 10, 2025; 5. "Rodl Glide" Released: November 17, 2025

Tranquilizer is the eleventh studio album by American electronic musician Daniel Lopatin, under his alias Oneohtrix Point Never. It was released on November 21, 2025, through Warp Records. The album's sound is derived from a removed sample library found on the Internet Archive. On October 20, 2025, the first three tracks and a music video for "Lifeworld" were released; following singles would be released weekly. The album received positive reviews from critics.

== Background and composition ==
According to Lopatin, Tranquilizer marks a return to a more 'process-orientated' approach to composition, akin to his 2011 album Replica. It derives its sound palette from an archive of 1990s sample libraries which Lopatin had found on the Internet Archive, in addition to presets from romplers. He had initially intended to revolve a musical project around the contents of the archive, but began focusing on it only after the original upload was deleted.

Much of the album's structure came together as the result of a few "late-evening jams" between Lopatin and producer and co-writer Nathan Salon, utilizing bespoke two-person systems which Salon described as "like Frippertronics but IDM." The results of these jams were then refined, resampled, and layered with further recordings and jams over a few month period, with the pair relying heavily on "intuition" and "chance" in completing the album.

== Release and artwork ==
In October 2025, Lopatin announced the upcoming release of Tranquilizer on November 17 digitally, and for physical issues on November 21, through Warp Records. The album was later released on November 21. New music from him would be released weekly after the announcement. On October 20, the first three tracks, "For Residue", "Bumpy", and "Lifeworld", were released. On Spotify, the tracks were released as an extended play (EP) named tra. Alongside, a music video for "Lifeworld" was posted. It was directed by Lopatin. On October 27, "Measuring Ruins" was released, with a music video of it directed by Yoshi Sodeoka. "Cherry Blue", the eighth track, and its music video was released on November 3. The music video was directed by Pol Taburet, and – according to Pitchfork – depicts surrealism to show "the gaps between life and death, body and spirit, and decay and renewal". The tenth track, "D.I.S.", and its music video was released on November 10. The music video was directed by Elliott Elder, and its imagery was credited to Julien Gobled. "Rodl Glide", the fourteenth track, was released on November 17. The music video for it was released later on the album's release, and was directed by Cory Arcangel. Lopatin toured throughout Europe from November 7 to 13, in support of Tranquilizer.

The cover art of Tranquilizer is a piece entitled Blue Interval, painted in 1972 by Abner Hershberger. When asked why Lopatin used it for the cover, he said: "I really liked the symmetry of the blades, as if to suggest distinct metronomic time. And then the chaos of what I think of as lime-green grass – or the tilling of the field – underneath it."

== Reception ==
Professional ratings
Aggregate scores
| Source | Rating |
|---|---|
| AnyDecentMusic? | 7.8/10 |
| Metacritic | 80/100 |
Review scores
| Source | Rating |
| AllMusic | 4.5/5 stars |
| Exclaim! | 8/10 |
| The Guardian | 4/5 stars |
| MusicOMH | 3.5/5 stars |
| Our Culture Mag | 4/5 stars |
| Paste | 8.0/10 |
| Pitchfork | 8.6/10 |
| Slant | 4.5/5 stars |
| Uncut | 3/5 stars |
| The Wire | 60/100 |

According to the review aggregator Metacritic, Tranquilizer received "generally favorable reviews" based on a weighted average score of 80 out of 100 from 11 critic scores. Pitchfork named the album as "Best New Music" on review; reviewer Philip Sherburne wrote that it was "the most immediately pleasurable Oneohtrix Point Never album in some time". Alexis Petridis, writer for The Guardian, said that "Tranquilizer seems unlikely to help you calm down. It's too kaleidoscopic and restless, too crammed with sounds: an album that demands – and repays – your full attention, rather than simply drifting by." The Quietus author Liam Inscoe-Jones compared the album to Lopatin's album Replica, in which Tranquilizer was said to "[read] like a celebration, a love letter to art which was once vanished and soon, most likely, will be again", while Replica was "located sadness in the motifs of advertising". In a writeup for The Wire, the reviewer wrote that the album "seems governed by the temporal logic of its samples, as if Lopatin were intent on preserving their integrity rather than reshaping them. The emotional resonance that usually grounds Lopatin's work feels somewhat displaced by this formal precision."

== Track listing ==
All tracks written by Daniel Lopatin, except where noted; all tracks produced by Daniel Lopatin and Nathan Salon.

Track listing of Tranquilizer
| No. | Title | Writer(s) | Length |
|---|---|---|---|
| 1. | "For Residue" | | 2:11 |
| 2. | "Bumpy" | | 4:05 |
| 3. | "Lifeworld" | Daniel Lopatin; Nathan Salon | 3:47 |
| 4. | "Measuring Ruins" | Lopatin; Salon | 3:04 |
| 5. | "Modern Lust" | | 5:03 |
| 6. | "Fear of Symmetry" | | 4:21 |
| 7. | "Vestigel" | | 4:42 |
| 8. | "Cherry Blue" | | 4:19 |
| 9. | "Bell Scanner" | Lopatin; Salon | 1:25 |
| 10. | "D.I.S." | | 3:32 |
| 11. | "Tranquilizer" | Lopatin; Salon | 2:46 |
| 12. | "Storm Show" | Lopatin; Salon | 4:33 |
| 13. | "Petro" | Lopatin; Salon | 2:52 |
| 14. | "Rodl Glide" | | 6:05 |
| 15. | "Waterfalls" | Lopatin; Salon | 5:41 |
| Total length: | | | 58:26 |

Japanese edition (bonus track)
| No. | Title | Writer(s) | Length |
|---|---|---|---|
| 16. | "For Residue" (Extended) | Lopatin; Salon | 5:32 |

Sample credits

- "Bumpy" samples "Secret Fountain" by David & Steve Gordon.
- "D.I.S." samples "La Religieuse d'Haiphong" by Jean-Claude Petit.
- "Cherry Blue" samples "Galaxy" by Manfred Schoof and Uwe Buschkötter.
- "Rodl Glide" samples "Gliding" by Georges Rodi.
- "Waterfalls" samples "Light Is Knowledge" by Jan Pulsford and "Crystal Silence" by Chick Corea.

== Personnel ==
Credits adapted from liner notes.

- Oneohtrix Point Never – production, design, art direction, synthesizers, keyboards, piano, percussion, samplers
- Nathan Salon – production, mixing, recording, synthesizers, samplers, human-controlled tape transport, percussion, vocals
- Abner Hershberger – artwork
- Elliott Elder – design, art direction
- Julien Gobled – design, art direction, typography
- Stefan Betke – mastering

== Charts ==
Chart performance for Tranquilizer
| Chart (2025) | Peak position |
|---|---|
| Japanese Dance & Soul Albums (Oricon) | 13 |
| UK Albums Sales (OCC) | 77 |
| UK Independent Albums (Official Charts) | 22 |
