= Erwilian =

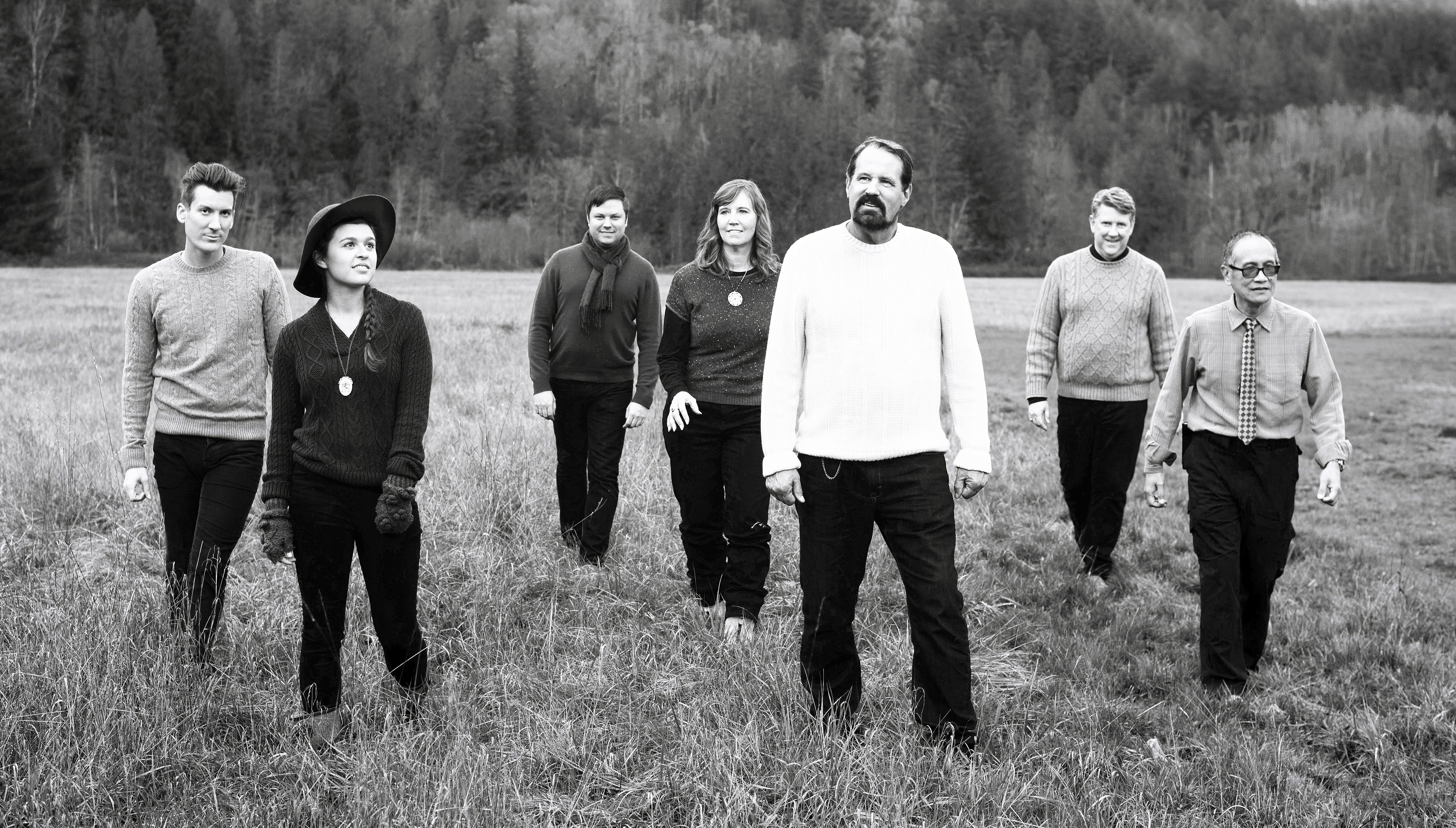
- Erwilian in 2019 (L to R: Jordan Buetow, Keely Rendle, John Hintze, Bethel Melton, Scott Melton, Matt Garcia, Malcolm Lee)

Background information
- Origin: Seattle, Washington, United States
- Genres: New-age, instrumental, acoustic music
- Years active: 2000–present
- Members: Jordan Buetow; Matt Garcia; John Hintze; Malcolm Lee; Bethel Melton; Scott Melton; Keely Rendle
- Past members: Bill Bowser; Brian Matheny; Scott Milliron; Jeff Reed; Robert Schuweiler
- Website: www.erwilian.com

Erwilian is an American musical group featuring acoustic instrumentation, led by soprano recorder, violin, and hammered dulcimer. The group blends elements from celtic, world, and folk music into an original cross-genre style classified as New Age. Since its formation in 2000, the group has featured various multi-instrumentalists in its lineup. Current members and primary instruments include founders Scott Melton (guitar) and Jordan Buetow (recorders), Bethel Melton (hammered dulcimer), Malcolm Lee (bass), Matt Garcia (harp), John Hintze (percussion), and Keely Rendle (violin).

In September 2019, Erwilian's EP ADVENT debuted at #1 on the Billboard New Age Albums chart, and #26 on the all-genre Billboard Independent Albums chart. The ensemble has contributed to numerous acclaimed projects, including Grammy Award winning albums Winds of Samsara (2014, Ricky Kej & Wouter Kellerman) and Divine Tides (2021, Stewart Copeland & Ricky Kej). Two additional collaborations have received Grammy Award nominations, Love Language (2015, Wouter Kellerman) and PANGAEA (2021, Wouter Kellerman & David Arkenstone). Additionally, the band's album Midwinter’s Night was the #1 Holiday album on the Zone Music Reporter Top 100 Radio Airplay for 2015.

== History ==
=== 2000-2005: Early years and formation ===
In 2000 Scott Melton, then a high school English teacher, approached Buetow, his student, after a performance by the school concert band. Together the duo recruited other students to meet at lunch in Melton’s classroom to experiment with acoustic and folk instruments, which eventually led to performances at seasonal school events. The group took on the name "Wood, Wind, & Wire," reflecting its primary instrumentation, but ultimately dwindled in size as students graduated. As a result, Melton and Buetow found musicians outside the school. Melton's wife Bethel, as well as mutual friends mandolinist Robert Schuweiler and guitarist Scott Milliron joined the band, and over the next three years the ensemble performed locally in the Seattle area and started work on their first recording project. In 2004, the group renamed to Erwilian and in 2005 released their first album, Renovata.

=== 2006-2019: Regional success and evolving sound ===
Through 2006-07 the group added percussionist Jeff Reed, guitarist Bill Bowser, and sound engineer Brian Matheny. 2007 also marked the beginning of Erwilian's popular series of annual Holiday concerts. For nearly a decade the group performed regularly throughout the Pacific Northwest, recording, and releasing two records – live concert album Midwinter’s Night (2009) and Light From Darkness (2012). The group's sound also expanded, adding Malcolm Lee as bassist in 2012 and multi-instrumentalist Matt Garcia in 2014. 2014 proved a pivotal year in the ensemble's history; Reed received a cancer diagnosis in April, ultimately passing away later that year. Shortly after Reed's death, Bowser and Matheny departed to pursue other music projects, and by the end of the year Erwilian evolved into its current lineup with the addition of John Hintze (percussion) and Keely Rendle (violin).

Following the addition of Hintze and Rendle, the group spent much of 2014-15 developing new material, as well as collaborating on other projects including Ricky Kej & Wouter Kellerman’s Grammy-winning Winds of Samsara (2014) and Kellerman’s Grammy-nominated Love Language (2015). Recording sessions throughout 2016-2018 became the basis of the band's 2019 Billboard chart-topping EP ADVENT.

== Musical style and influences ==
Erwilian became known for using numerous acoustic instruments in their recordings and performances rather than synthesized or electronic substitutes, even for rare instruments. Their collection comprises many different woodwinds, strings, and percussion from diverse genres and cultures including various recorders, whistles, chalumeaux, violin, viola, cello, harp, guitar, bass, hammered dulcimer, mandolin, Appalachian dulcimer, timpani, celesta, harmonium, melodica, accordion, marimba, orchestra chimes, and handbells.

== Discography ==
Title	Album details	Peak chart positions							Certifications
Title	Album details	US New Age	US HS Pac.	US Ind.	US Heat	US Top Alb Sales	US Current Alb Sales	ZMR Top 100	Certifications
Renovata	Released: 20 May 2005; Label: Wood, Wind, & Wire; Format: CD · digital download	—	—	—	—	—	—	—	
Midwinter's Night	Released: 22 December 2009; Label: Wood, Wind, & Wire; Format: CD · digital download	—	—	—	—	—	—	6	
Light From Darkness	Released: 18 December 2012; Label: Wood, Wind, & Wire; Format: CD · digital download	—	—	—	—	—	—	50	
ADVENT (EP)	Released: 23 August 2019; Label: Wood, Wind, & Wire; Format: CD · Deluxe CD · digital download	1	1	26	7	—	—	2	
Cascadia	Released: 25 August 2023; Label: Wood, Wind, & Wire; Format: CD · digital download	3	–	–	–	99	58	–	
"—" denotes a title that did not chart, or was not released in that territory.

== Guest appearances ==
List of guest appearances with other recording artists, showing year released and album name
Song	Album	Artist	Year
"Mountain Solitude"	Winds of Samsara	Ricky Kej & Wouter Kellerman	2014
"Blue Bird Day"	Elysian	Lynn Yew Evers	2015
"Turning Page"	Love Language	Wouter Kellerman	2016
"Lullaby"	Lullaby	Elizabeth Butler	2016
"As Long as We Believe"	Action Moves People United	Various Artists	2016
"Grand Old Duke of York"	Songs for Little Ones	Charlie Hope	2016
"My Baby"	Songs for Little Ones	Charlie Hope	2016
"Sailing, Sailing"	Songs for Little Ones	Charlie Hope	2016
"Twinkle, Twinkle, Little Star"	Songs for Little Ones	Charlie Hope	2016
"O Love"	Songs of Joy, Songs of Hope	Breath of Aire	2020
"Amazing Grace / My Chains are Gone"	Songs of Joy, Songs of Hope	Breath of Aire	2020
"Ancient Words"	Songs of Joy, Songs of Hope	Breath of Aire	2020
"Fighting with Angels"	Fighting with Angels	Elizabeth Butler	2021
"Himalayas"	Divine Tides	Stewart Copeland & Ricky Kej	2021
"Across Land and Sea"	Pangaea	Wouter Kellerman & David Arkenstone	2021
"Taranaki Rises"	Pangaea	Wouter Kellerman & David Arkenstone	2021
