= Suzanne Doucet =

Background information
- Born: Suzanne Doucet; 27 August 1944 (age 82)
- Origin: Tübingen, Germany
- Genres: Electronic, new-age
- Occupations: Musician, Songwriter, producer
- Instruments: Guitar, Keyboards, Synthesizers
- Years active: 1963- now
- Label: Only New Age Music
- Website: http://www.suzannedoucet.com

Suzanne Doucet is a German new-age musician, producer, composer, and singer, best known for being one of the founders of new age music. She was the founder of the first new age music store in Hollywood, California Only New Age Music in 1987 and founded the first New Age Music Conference in Los Angeles in 1989.

Doucet was an actress and singer in Germany and Switzerland in the 1960s and 1970s receiving European airplay for her German version of Be My Baby, which charted at number 1 on German music charts. Bunter Drachen, which appeared in the Guy Ritchie film, The Man from U.N.C.L.E. also charted at number 1. She starred in Godspell, alongside Donna Summer, which toured throughout Europe.

In 2020, Fact Magazine listed Doucet's album Reflecting Light, Vol. 1 from 1983 at number 4 of the 20 Best New Age Albums of all Time. Her single, Forever, was featured in Shirley Maclaine's videos, Inner Workout and Going Within.

== Early life and career ==
Suzanne Doucet was born on August 27, 1944, in Tübingen, Germany. Her father, Dr. Friedrich-Wilhelm Doucet, wrote numerous books on dream interpretation and parapsychological phenomena and her mother, Helen von Muenchhofen was a theater actress.

She moved to Munich in 1962 and studied at the Sorbonne in Paris in 1963. By the age of 18, Doucet was an established pop star in Germany.

== Career ==
Before Doucet started her career in the entertainment industry she worked as a designer and painter in Ascona (Switzerland). She played the leading part in a theater comedy "Die Türen knallen" in Stuttgart in 1963 and was discovered by the record company Metronome. She had her first TV appearance in the live TV show "Familienparty" in Hamburg in 1963 on NDR.

As a pop music artist, Doucet's first hit song was the German version of Be My Baby (Sei mein Baby) in 1964 which reached No. 1 on the German pop charts. Shortly afterward she released, Das Geht Doch Keinen Etwas An which made the Top-10 on German charts. Her first U.S. single release was, Swan Song (Liberty Records), which was listed as a Best Bet by Cashbox Magazine.

As an actress Suzanne played also in the musical Godspell with Donna Summer directed by Samy Molcho in 1972 in Munich, Zurich and Vienna. She also played in many German TV plays and TV musicals with actors such as Thomas Fritsch, Hans Clarin, Marianne Hoppe, Rainer Werner Fassbinder and Ulli Lommel. She wrote songs for Udo Jürgens, Wenche Myhre, Mireille Mathieu, and Abi Ofarim. Doucet moderated several TV shows in Germany and Switzerland. Her guests included the group Yes the Bee Gees, Grateful Dead, Keith Emerson and David Bowie. She composed music for the TV films All Backs Were Turned and Lieber Erwin, directed by award-winning director Thomas Fantl.

Doucet moved to the US in 1983 and opened Only New Age Music in Hollywood, CA With her husband James Bell as well as founding the International New Age Music Network in 1987. She produced and directed three international conferences and the first New Age/World Music Festival at the Wiltern Theater (featuring artists such as Paul Horn, Steven Halpern, Tim Wheater, Jai Uttal). Doucet recorded and released 50+ albums in the US with New Age music also collaborating with Chuck Plaisance, Gary Miraz, and Tajalli (See discography).

Doucet established herself in the US as a composer and producer as well. She won the Silver award at the WorldFest-Houston International Film Festival for her music video Starflight. She also produced albums with other artists and released 12 compilation albums called Sounds From the Circle with many well known new age artists such as Steven Halpern, Chuck Wild, Peter Kater, Sangeeta Kaur, Ricky Kej, Wouter Kellerman, and Anaya Kunst.

== Discography ==
In Germany

- 2011 - Wo Sind All Die Schoenen Jahre (album)
- 1980 - Reisefieber (album)
- 1980 - Koerper und Chakra Meditation (album)
- 1979 - Fass Mich Nicht An / Harmony (single)
- 1979 - Roller Skate Is Up To Date / Disco Roller Race (single)
- 1975 - In Essig und Öl (album)
- 1975 - Fragen / Was Macht Der Wind Wenn Er Nicht Weht (single)
- 1974 - Wo Sind All Die Schoenen Jahre / Das Herz der Welt (single)
- 1969 - Suzanne Doucet International (album)
- 1969 - 1910 / Liebe Kann Man Nicht Verbieten (single)
- 1968 - Wenn New York Brennt / Es Ist Vorbei (single)
- 1969 - Nein Sagt Sich So Leicht / Kleine Kinder (single)
- 1968 - Swan Song / Cry My Heart (single)
- 1968 - Nur Mit Dir / Sag Mir (single)
- 1965 - Glück Und Liebe / Aber Was Weiss Ich Von Dir (single)
- 1965 - Das Steht In Keinem Schulbuch / Geh Nicht Am Glueck Vorbei (single)
- 1966 - Rot wie Rubin (album)
- 1966 - Du Musst Dich Entscheiden / Nur Aus Schaden Wird Man Klug (single)
- 1965 - So Long, So Long / Oho, Aha (single)
- 1964 - Okay - Ich Geh / Was Faellt Dir Ein (single)
- 1964 - Das Geht Doch Keinen Etwas An / Sei Mein Baby (single)
- 1964 - Sei Mein Baby / Das Geht Doch Keinen Etwas An (single)
- 1963 - Schenk mir einen Tag mit viel Amore / Warte Nicht Bis Morgen (single)

In the USA

- 2018 - Spirit Walk (single)
- 2015 - Gobi (Desert Meditation & Shamanic Drumming) (single)
- 2015 - Moon Valley (Ambient Introspection) (single)
- 2015 - Bunter Drachen (single)
- 2005 - The Om sound (album)
- 2005 - As It Is Now (album)
- 2004 - Tantra Zone (album)
- 2004 - Shasta - Sacred Mountain (album)
- 2001 - Resonance (album)
- 1999 - Tranquility Sampler (album)
- 1999 - Zen Garden (album)
- 1999 - Forever Rain (album)
- 1999 - Cypress Magic (album)
- 1999 - Cosmic Night (album)
- 1999 - Deep Thunder (album)
- 1999 - Malibu Beach (album)
- 1999 - Enchanted Rainforest (album)
- 1999 - Moonlight in the Canyon (album)
- 1999 - Secret Lake (album)
- 1999 - Dancing Waves (album)
- 1999 - Bayou Plaisance (album)
- 1999 - Voice of the Wind (album)
- 1999 - Sacred Forest (album)
- 1999 - Mountain Song (album)
- 1999 - Morning In The Forest (album)
- 1999 - Whale’s Love Song (album)
- 1999 - Desert Dreams (album)
- 1999 - Thunder over Shasta (album)
- 1999 - River of Life (album)
- 1999 - Tijuca Falls (album)
- 1998 - Sounds of Nature Sampler (album)
- 1998 - Ocean Waves (album)
- 1998 - Bubbling Creek (album)
- 1998 - Southern Swamp (album)
- 1998 - Rainstorms (album)
- 1998 - Desert Oasis (album)
- 1998 - Forest Morning (album)
- 1998 - Mountain Ranch (album)
- 1998 - The River (album)
- 1998 - Pine Forest (album)
- 1998 - Thunderstorm (album)
- 1998 - At the Lake (album)
- 1998 - Summer Nights (album)
- 1998 - Song of the Humpback Whales (album)
- 1998 - Rainforest (1998)
- 1998 - A Night in the Canyon (album)
- 1998 - Before the Storm (album )
- 1998 - Walk at the Beach (album)
- 1998 - Waterfalls (album)
- 1998 - Wetlands (album)
- 1998 - Dolphin Dance (album)
- 1986 - The Voyage Beyond (album)
- 1984 - Brilliance (album)
- 1984 - Reflecting Light (vol.2) (album)
- 1983 - Reflecting Light (vol.1) (album)
- 1983 - Transmission (album)
- 1982 - Transformation (album)

Other

- 2010 to 2021 - Sounds from the Circle (MP3 Compilations) vol. 1 - 12
- 1991 - Music Video STARFLIGHT

== See also ==
- List of ambient music artists
- List of new-age music artists
