= New Earth =

New Earth may refer to:

== Books ==
- A New Earth: Awakening to Your Life's Purpose, a book by Eckhart Tolle
- "New Earth", the destination planet of Alpha Centauri featured in the sci-fi novel series First Ark to Alpha Centauri by A. Ahad
- Star Trek: New Earth, a series of Star Trek: The Original Series novels

== Media ==
- New Earth (film) (Dutch: Nieuwe Gronden), 1934 documentary film by Joris Ivens
- New Earth (DC Comics)
  - The former primary Earth in the DC Comics Universe; see Multiverse (DC Comics)
- "New Earth" (Doctor Who), an episode of Doctor Who
- The destination of the post-nuclear Earth colony in The Time Travelers (1964 film)

== Other uses ==
- Mass Effect: New Earth, amusement park ride at California's Great America
- New Earth (Christianity)
- New Earth Records, German record label
