= Lis Addison =

American musician (born 1958)

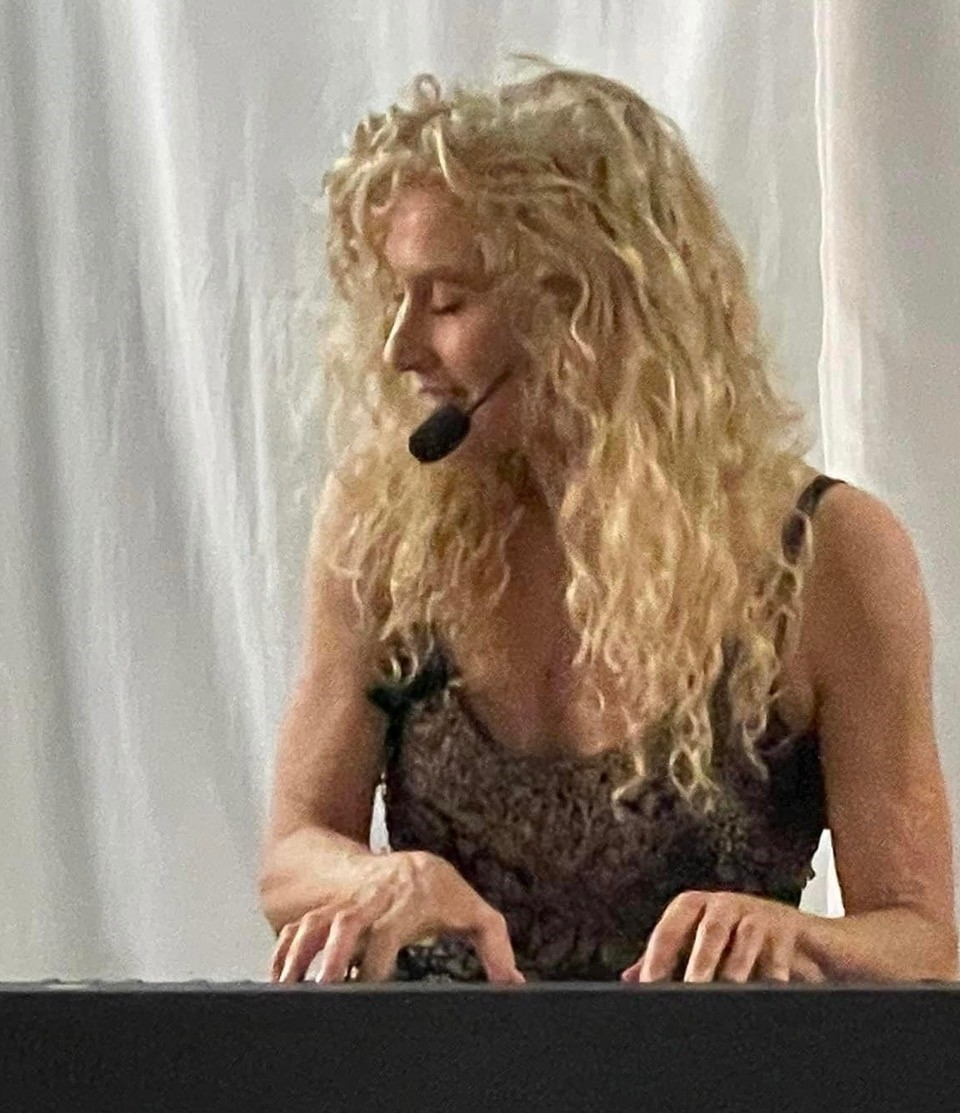
- Lis Addison performing in San Rafael, California

Background information
- Born: Lis Addison; San Francisco, California, U.S.
- Genres: Ambient, classical crossover, world, new age, and electronic music
- Occupations: Composer; vocalist; keyboardist; producer; environmentalist; philanthropist
- Instruments: Vocalist, keyboards
- Years active: 1985–present
- Label: All Aglow Music
- Website: www.lisaddison.com

Lis Addison is a composer/musician/producer, dancer, and environmental philanthropist. She composes in the ambient, classical crossover, world, new age and electronic music genres. Addison has composed and produced sixteen solo albums, soundtracks for film and dance and has over 15 million streams on Spotify, Apple, and Pandora. Her last four albums have charted in the top 10 of the New Age Charts.

Addison writes meditative music, African-influenced dance music, and Indian-influenced music.

== Early life and education ==
Addison's father was a doctor, her mother was a ballet dancer and her grandmother a pianist. She began studying dance at age 8, piano at age 10, and writing songs at age 11. Addison went to Mills College, where she earned a BA in “Historical and Contemporary Perspectives of Music and the Environment” (an individualized major combining studies in music, history and biology), and an MFA in “Electronic Music and the Recording Media.”

As an undergrad Addison studied piano, voice, and composition with Terry Riley and Lou Harrison, and music theory with Allaudin Mathieu. Collectively, they introduced her to world music.

She was particularly drawn to Riley. This led to her studying north Indian classical Raga singing with Riley's teacher Pandit Pran Nath from India.

While at Mills played in a reggae band in a more traditional singer-songwriter material role.

She returned to Mills as a grad student in electronic music and recording. Addison studied voice, electronics, and rhythm to create electronic atmospheres.

== Composition/Electronic Music ==
The Mills influence undergirds her music in many ways and she developed “a distinctive sound using her voice as an instrument mixed with electronic atmospheres.”

== Work at the Globe Sound Healing Institute and Kinetic Voice ==
Addison cites a road trip in the deserts outside Los Angeles during which she encountered a rattlesnake and experienced a near-miss by lightning as a crucial turning point for her music. And after that trip, Addison began incorporating sound-healing concepts into her music and experimenting with her voice in what she describes as unidiomatic ways.

These concepts informed Addison's work at the Globe Sound Healing Institute in Sausalito. Addison developed a system of “chakra vocalizations” to move energy through the body. She founded the Kinetic Voice program after working with hundreds of women and observing a pattern of collective oppression in the female voice.

Kinetic Voice seeks to give women the freedom to let the emotions of anxiety and anger out by way of letting their voice out.

The program introduces students to vocals and movement, so they feel music on a somatic level.

The Trilogy of the program consists of:

- Chakra Chants and Signature Steps (from Song of the Tree)
- Body Chants and Signature Steps (from Grace of the Green Leaf)
- Elements and Signature Steps (from Elements)

Addison's Song of the Tree album (2008) both laid the foundation for her distinct musical style and for KiVo. Chakra Chants, found on the album, consist of non-language specific vocalizations (vocables) that explore the use of vocal vibration to help clear the Chakras and release tension. Following its release, she choreographed specific movements to accompany the vocalizations.

During the COVID pandemic, Addison observed that life was pared down to its simplest elements: less driving, less entertainment, less work and travel, staying closer to home and family. This led her to releasing Elements which features music pared down to its elements (with tracks beginning in five-tone pentatonic scales not seven-tone scales). Addison centered the album on the elements needed for survival - earth, air, fire, and water.

Her album Zadaka was commissioned by a dance technique called the Nia Technique. Zadaka became Nia's "Source." This collaboration led to a tour of more than 50 cities in Australia, Canada, Europe, Israel, Mexico and the US. Performances featured Addison singing her music backed by an Afro beat while the audience participated in Nia Technique inspired dance movement. This would be followed by a KiVo workshop.

== Philanthropy ==
Ms. Addison studied environmental science at Mills College and in 2013 created the non-profit Singing Tree Institute, an environmental non-profit that has planted more than 7,000 trees in Kitui, Kenya. Singing Tree plants trees and documents songs and dances of the Kamba community in Kenya.

The plantings are mainly in the rural community of Kangweni, Kenya. Planting days with students from Maviani Primary School, Yanzuu Daystar Academy, St. John’s Church and Syombuku Vocational College end with a celebration of singing and dancing.

== Teaching ==
Ms. Addison joined the staff of the San Francisco Conservatory of Music during the Fall semester in 2026 in their Professional Development and Technology and Applied Composition programs.

Addison has been a professor at SAE Expressions Digital Arts College where she taught Music Theory and Environmental Science. She has also taught at the Globe Sound Healing Institute where she taught her Kinetic Voice Program, Music Theory and North Indian Classical Raga Singing.

== Discography ==
- All God’s Creatures (1985)
- The Daughters of Urth (1986)
- Seven Gifts (2004)
- The Song of the Tree (2008)
- The Grace of the Green Leaf (2010)
- Medicine Drum Kirtan (2012)
- Crown in the Sky (2013)
- Music for Rainbow Meditation (2014)
- The Mighty Mountains (2014)
- On the Earth I Go (2014)
- Body Chants (2015)
- Shikamu (2015)
- Habitats (2018)
- Zadaka (2019)
- Elements (2022)
- Songs from the Mara (2023)
- Seven Gifts (remix) (2023)
- Blue Lotus (remix) (2024)
- Kitui Rain (2023)
- Sunset on the Mara (2023)
- Elephants on the Mara (2023)
- Nature Sound Bath from the Mara (2024)
- Lone Birds on the Mara (2024)
- Jewel in the Mist (2025)
- Songbird Tapestry (2025)
- Magenta Rains (2025)
- Bubbling Kassina Frogs (2025)
- Dove Symphonics (2025)
- Cosmic African Rains (2025)
- Serene Sonics (2025)
- Revolving Stars (2025)
- Lush (2026)
- Windows to the Light (2026)

=== Compilations ===
- Alive (2009)
- Spirit Calls (2010)
- Invitation from Within (2013)
- Cecil’s Pride (2015)
- Source (2017)
- Go (2019)

== Sheet Music ==
- Scenic Route 58 (1985)
- The Room (1996)
- The Phoenix (2009)

== Awards ==
- Best Vocal Album, Zone Music Reporter, The Grace of the Green Leaf 2010
- Silver Medal, Global Music Awards, Crown in the Sky 2016
- Silver Medal, Global Music Awards, Zadaka, 2019
- Silver Medal, Global Music Awards, Elements 2022
- Third Place Album, NACC Chart - Top 30, Elements, 2022
- 1st Place, One World Music Awards, Best Single, 2023, Sunset on the Mara
- 3rd Place Album, Echoes Radio Top 25, September 2023, Songs from the Mara
- 3rd Place Album, One World Music Awards, 2023, Songs from the Mara
- Silver Medal, Global Music Awards, Songs from the Mara, 2023
- Fourth Place Album, NACC Chart - Top 30, Songs from the Mara, 2023
- Best New Age Album, World Entertainment Awards, Songs from the Mara – Sunset on the Mara, 2025
