= Effortless Relaxation =

- 2003 reissue

Studio album by Steven Halpern
- Released: 1991
- Genre: New-age
- Label: Inner Peace Music

Steven Halpern chronology
Islands in Time (1990)	Effortless Relaxation (1991)	Enhancing Self-Esteem (1991)

Effortless Relaxation is an album by Steven Halpern, released in 1991. All tracks except Pachelbel's Canon were written by Halpern. The album was reissued in 2003, incorporating subliminal suggestions, and with a slightly different track list.

== Track listing ==
1. "Pachelbel's Canon (in D Major)", Johann Pachelbel
2. "48 Hours"
3. "Dawn"
4. "Crystal Suite"
5. "Comfort Zone, Part 1"
6. "Comfort Zone, Part 2"
7. "In the Flow"
8. "Hush"
9. "Eventide"
