= New Earth Records =

New Earth Records is an independent record label focusing primarily on new age and world music, with offices in Boulder, Colorado, and Ashland, Oregon. It was founded in 1990 in Munich, Germany, by European entrepreneurs Bhikkhu Schober and Waduda Paradiso. Initially, called Tao Music, Schober and Paradiso opted to change the name to New Earth Records. New Earth is one of the first labels to pioneer the introduction of meditation, yoga, and world music to a worldwide audience.

During the early 1990s, New Earth began to expand its scope, signing a number of recording artists who produced eastern-influenced, meditative music. Among the first were Prem Joshua, Al Gromer Khan, Hariprasad Chaurasia, and James Asher.

Since its founding, New Earth has signed over 50 artists and released more than 280 albums distributed across 92 countries. Its catalog receives hundreds of millions of streams per year across various platforms.

New Earth's catalog is dominated by music intended to accompany various alternative healing practices such as Reiki, massage, meditation, and Yoga. Prominent recent New Earth artists include Deuter, Parijat, Kamal, Terry Oldfield, Chinmaya Dunster, Peter Kater, Dechen Shak-Dagsay, Al Gromer Khan, Anuvida, and Rasa.

New Earth has used recycled paper and soy ink for its publications since its founding and continues to support various non-profit organizations dedicated to climate change issues.

== Timeline ==
- In 1995, the success of the European release of James Asher's world beat album Feet In The Soil, prompted the label to move from Munich to Boulder, Colorado, United States.
- In 1999, New Earth moved its creative offices to Santa Fe, New Mexico.
- In 2002, New Earth artist Chinmaya Dunster and his Celtic Ragas Band performed at Paul McCartney’s wedding in Ireland with Schober and Paradiso in attendance.
- In 2005, New Earth artist Terry Oldfield’s album De Profundis: Out of the Depths 2 received the Narcissus Award for the Best New Age Album from the New Age Retailer magazine.
- In 2009, New Earth published the album BEYOND in the US featuring Tina Turner, Dechen Shak-Dagsay, and Regula Curti.
- In 2010, the album Pure Sounds by the Gyuto Monks of Tibet, released by New Earth, was nominated for a Grammy award in the category of Best Traditional World Music Album. Paradiso was nominated for her work as Executive Producer on the album.
- In 2013, New Earth again moved its creative offices back to Boulder, Colorado, where it remains today.
- In 2016, New Earth artist Deuter received a Lifetime Achievement Award from Zone Music Reporter for his contributions to the genre of new age music.

== See also ==
- List of record labels
