= Betty Butler =

Betty Butler may refer to:

- Betty Butler, founder of Circus Juventas
- Betty Butler, see College Bowl
- Betty Butler, station manager of WTLS
- List of DC Comics characters: B, Betty Butler

== See also ==
- Elizabeth Butler (disambiguation)
