= Mount Himekami =

Mountain in Morioka, Iwate, Japan

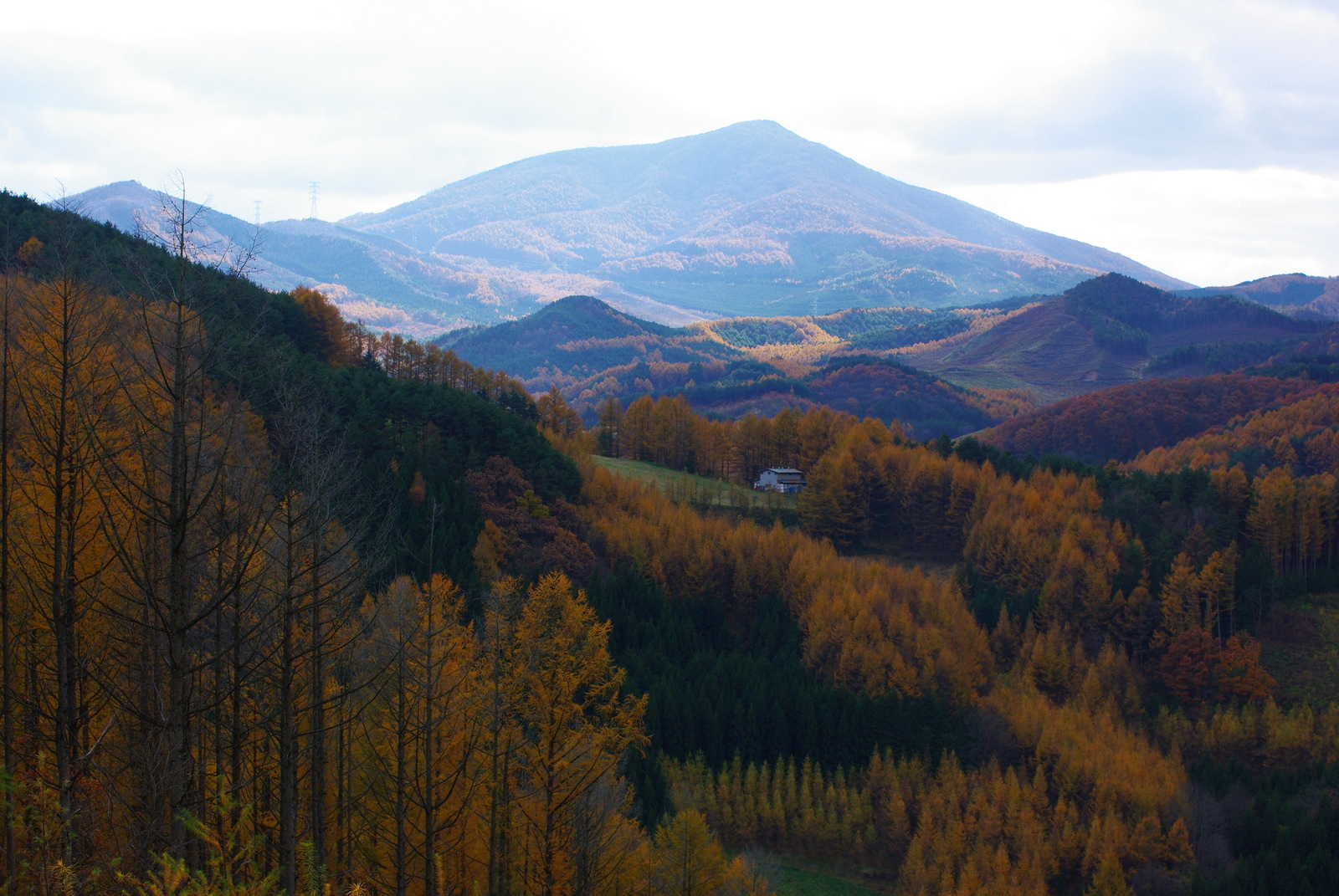
- Seen from the NbE.

Highest point
- Elevation: 1,124 m (3,688 ft)
- Coordinates: 39°54′59.91″N 141°12′56.8″E

Naming
- Native name: 姫神山 (Japanese)

Geography
- Location within Iwate Prefecture
- Location: Morioka, Iwate Prefecture, Tōhoku, Japan

Climbing
- Access: Hiking

Mount Himekami (Japanese: 姫神山, Himekami-san) is a mountain in Morioka, Iwate Prefecture, Japan. It lends its name to the band Himekami. Mt. Himekami is about 20 kilometres (12 mi) north of urban Morioka and features alpine flora and views of Mount Iwate. A relatively easy hike to its summit is practicable from April to November.

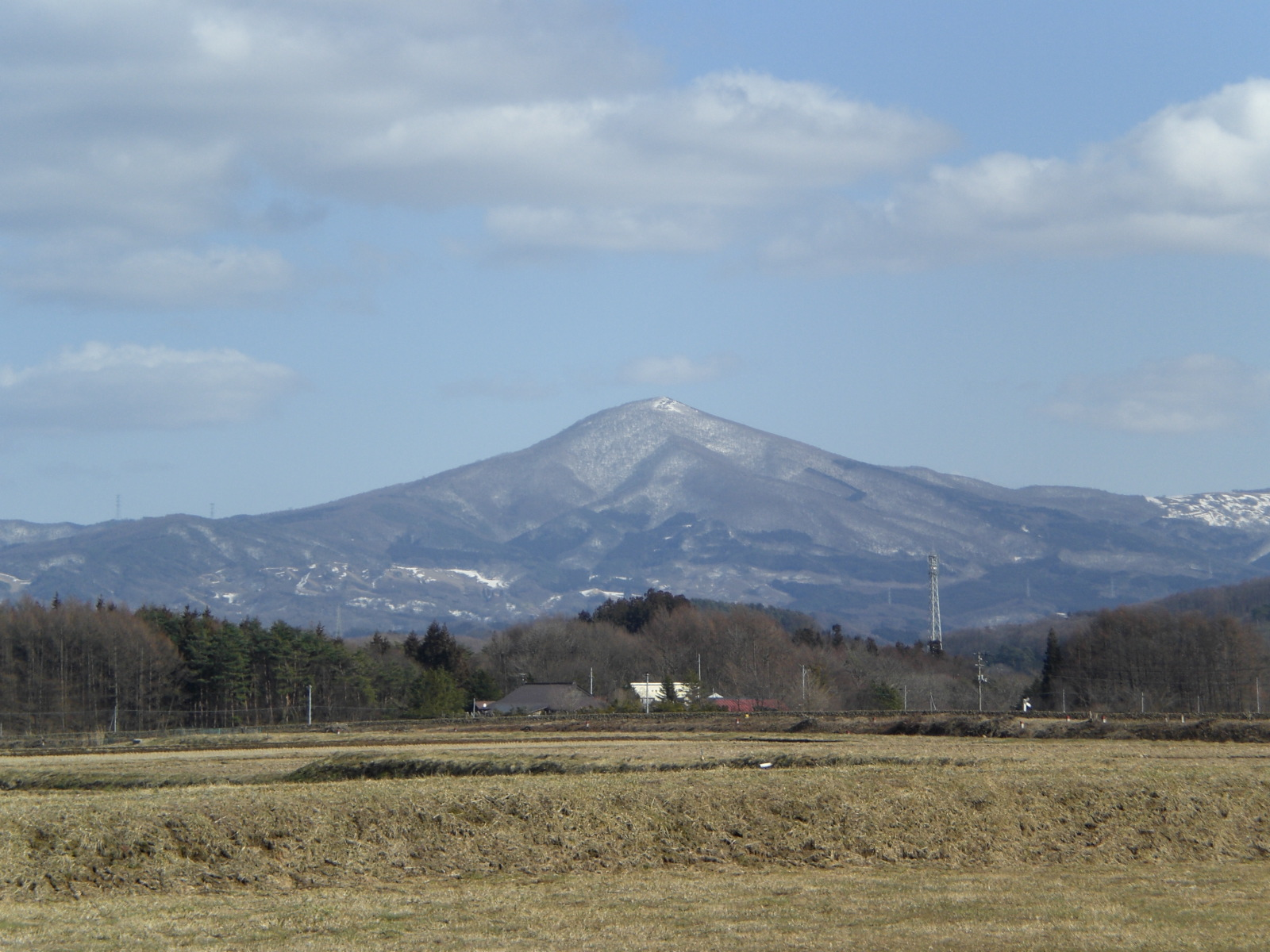
Seen from the WNW

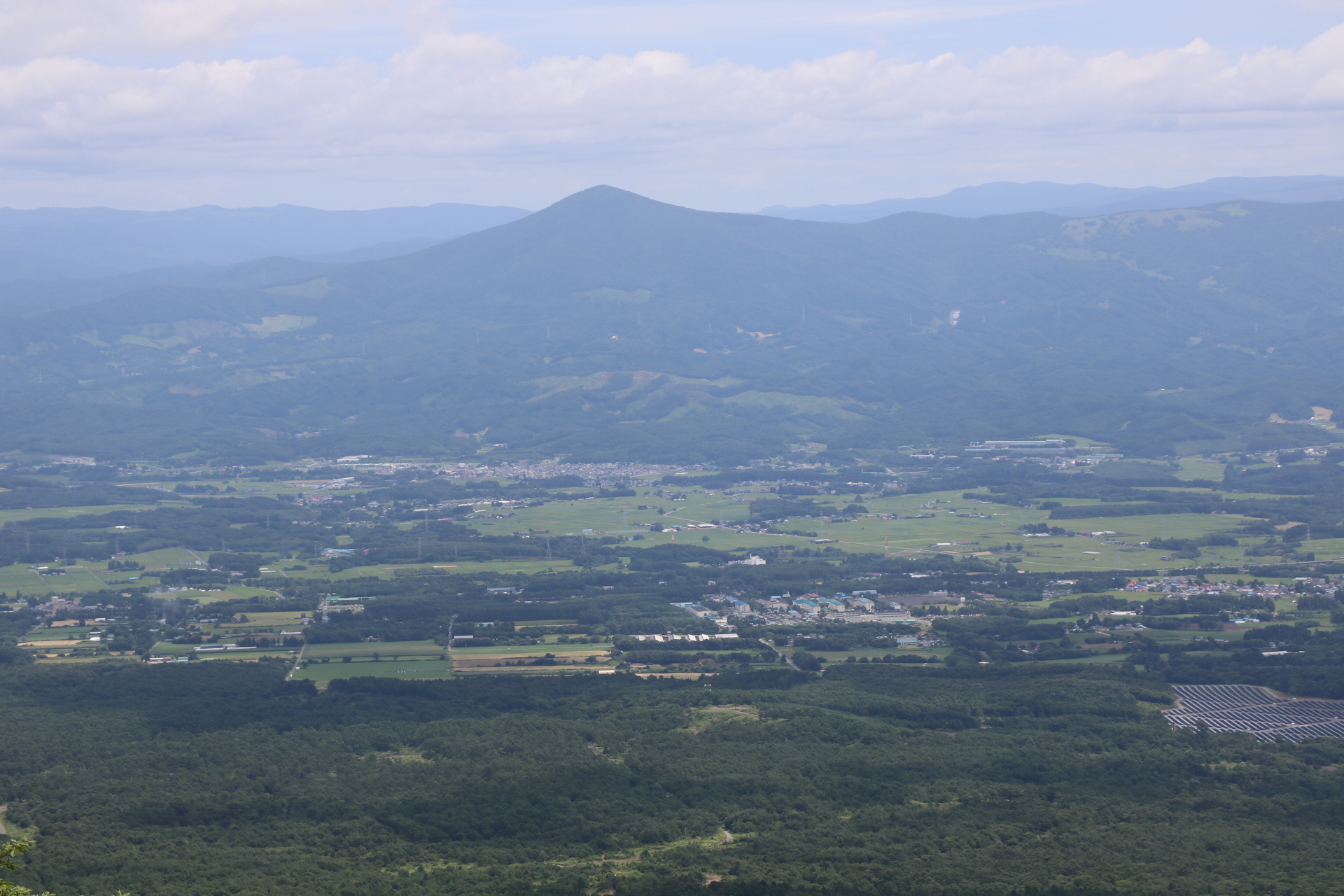
Seen from the west. Taken from Mount Iwate

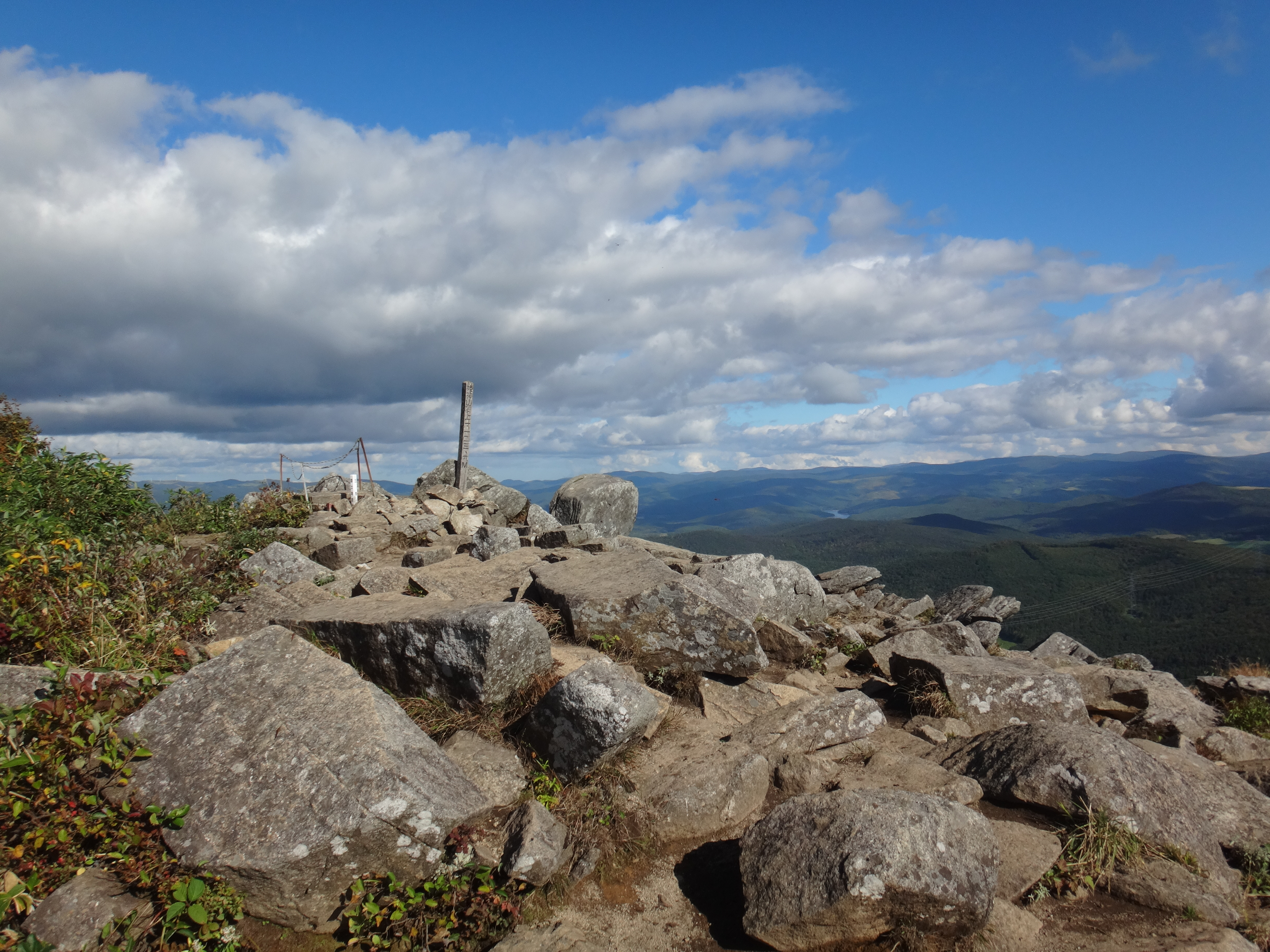
The top of Mount Himekami
