= Elizabeth Golcher Butler =

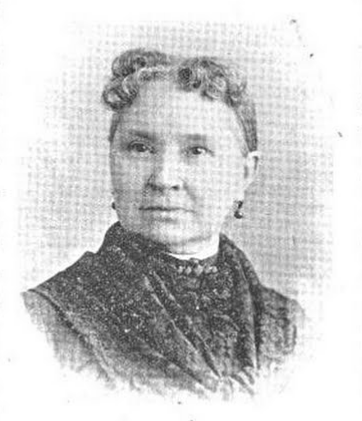
Elizabeth Golcher Butler

Elizabeth Golcher Butler (October 16, 1831 – July 13, 1906) was a British-born American women's activist and a pioneer in the Order of the Eastern Star. With the establishment of the General Grand Chapter, which would have full control over the ritual, Butler was elected to its highest office, becoming its first Most Worthy Grand Matron (1876–1878). To be active among the first in any movement which is successful is to occupy a position of prominence. To be the first Matron of the first chapter in any State is an honor to any member of the Order of the Eastern Star; to be the first Grand Matron of a Grand Chapter is a greater honor; but to be the first Most Worthy Grand Matron of the General Grand Chapter—the federated head of the Order—was the highest honor one could receive within the Order.

Butler (née Golcher) was born in England in 1831. With her family, she came to the United States as a child, and settled in Pennsylvania. Her early womanhood was spent in Philadelphia, where she married Joseph Butler. In 1857, they moved to Chicago, Illinois, with their children. Upon the introduction of the Order into Illinois, she became a charter member, and Matron of Miriam Chapter, No. 1. When, the Order taking shape and system, the General Grand Chapter was organized by the representatives of the various Grand Chapters, at Indianapolis, Indiana, in November 1876, Butler was unanimously elevated to the office of Most Worthy Grand Matron. Butler Chapter No. 36 was named in her honor. She died in 1906.

== Early years ==
Elizabeth Golcher was born in Birmingham, England, October 16, 1831. When she was 9, her parents came to the United States. After spending two or three years in changing localities, a permanent home was established in Philadelphia, where Butler grew up.

== Career ==
In Philadelphia, she met her future husband, Joseph Butler, whom she married, July 4, 1850. After eight years, during which they had three children, the family removed their business to Chicago. In 1863, Joseph was made a member of Garden City Lodge A. F. & A. M. and in a short time after, was chosen as the Worshipful Master. He also became a Sir Knight in Chicago Commandery.

When the idea of organizing a Chapter of the Eastern Star was proposed among their friends, the Butlers united their efforts with others in bringing it to a successful issue. A charter bearing date March 1, 1869, was granted them, as Miriam Chapter No. 1, of Illinois, with Mrs. Butler as Worthy Matron, which office she filled for two successive terms, and one after the Great Chicago Fire of 1871. She said that upon receiving the degrees, she was impressed with the adaptiveness of the workings of the Order as an aid to woman in her individual efforts to better fit herself, socially and mentally, for the wider sphere of activities that seemed to be opening for her, and that therein she could find opportunities for useful work, however feeble her efforts, in making the Order a mighty lever to raise woman to a higher plane. She determined to unite with those who were endeavoring to bring the Order to a position where it would be deserving of general recognition. Her steady and persistent efforts for the advancement of the interests of her own chapter, led naturally to her elevation to the Grand East when the Grand Chapter was organized in 1875.

The difficulties attending the establishment of the Order at that period could not be realized, aside from actual experience. As the Order progressed through the different states, it was found necessary to secure a more perfect uniformity of ritual work, and the several Grand Chapters proposed to make a General Grand body, which should have full control over the ritual, and appointed delegates to convene in session in the city of Indianapolis, where it was satisfactorily organized. Butler being present as the representative of Illinois had the honor to be selected as the first Most Worthy Grand Matron.

Soon after the establishment of the Order in Illinois, the attention of the first Worthy Matron was drawn to the peculiar adaptation of the work as an aid to the outlook for widening the sphere of woman's usefulness, which was then being strongly agitated in general society, and as a factor to that end, Butler was led to feel that its success was a matter of the highest interest to women.

Butler was heard on many occasions to remark that the Eastern Star contained in itself, not only all the facilities for the practice of benevolence and other kindred virtues suggested to woman, but it might further become a source for women to develop abilities and establish claims to a share in the advancement of social and civil reform. When in the performance of her duties as Grand Lecturess of Illinois, she made every effort to impress her audience with her own ideas in this respect. Much of the stalwart vigor which characterized the Order in Illinois, was due to her earnestness and sincerity, which was the more evident when the fact was known that she never asked remuneration for either labor or travel, and never presented a bill of expenses of any kind, to either Grand or Subordinate Chapters.

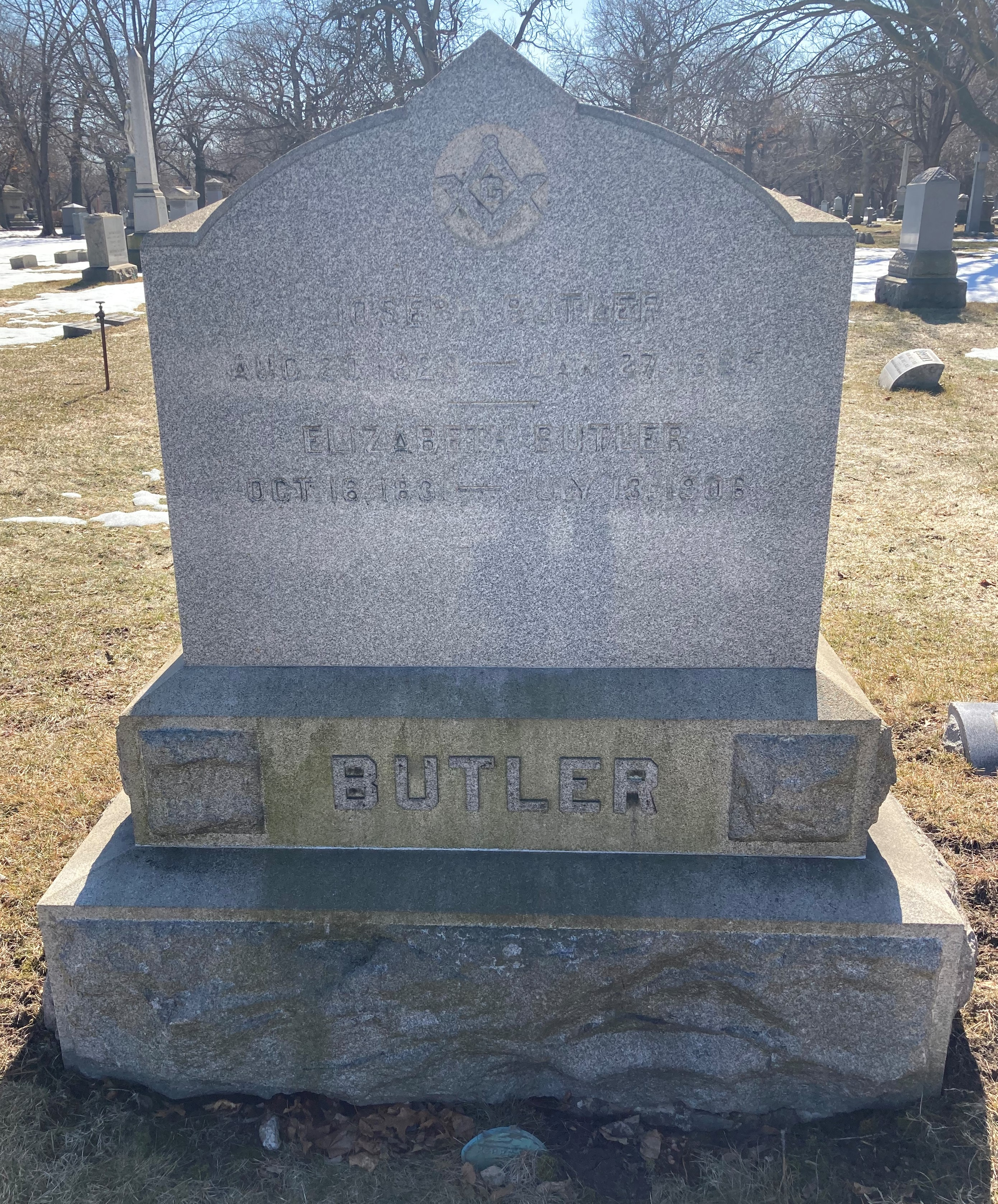
Grave at Rosehill Cemetery

A most unusual peculiarity in Butler's experience, was that every position to which she had been appointed or elected in the Order, from a District Deputy up to the Most Worthy Grand Matron, she was always No. 1, being after the creation of the office, selected as the first to fill it. This bears its own merit and speaks well for pioneer service.

== Personal life ==
On January 27, 1885, she became a widow, her husband's death being the final result of a paralytic stroke, which occurred over five years previous. They had eight children, four sons and four daughters. She died July 13, 1906, and was buried beside her husband in Rosehill Cemetery.
