= Kathryn Toyama =

- Instrument: Piano
- Website: kathryntoyama.com

Kathryn Toyama is a classically trained pianist/keyboardist who composes new-age solo instrumental music. Her album, Hope for Harmony, debuted at No.5 on the NAR World Radio Chart in May 2007. A number of her compositions are placed in regular rotation by numerous Internet radio stations and two of them have been played on XM Satellite Radio.

== Discography ==
- Hope for Harmony
