= Levente Egry =

Levente Egry (born 21 August 1969) is a Hungarian performing artist, composer, producer, performer, and pianist. He is the holder of the last Hungarian Diamond Record (the category is no longer in use) for over 100,000 records sold in Hungary. He started a classical-crossover project, Sentimental Piano Concert. After an early career in classical music, and acclaim as a jazz and pop artist, now he is now pursuing a career as a classical composer and pianist.

== Education ==
- 1991-1993 Ferenc (Franz) Liszt Music Academy – Budapest – piano
- 1987-1991 Ferenc Liszt Music Academy/Jazz Faculty – Budapest – piano, professor: Bela Szakcsi-Lakatos, Karoly Binder, Janos Gonda
- 1983-1987 Béla Bartók High School of Music – Budapest – piano
- 1976-1983 National Secondary School of Music – Budapest – piano

== Biography ==
Levente Egry was born on 21 August 1969 in Budapest, Hungary. He is a concert pianist, composer, producer. He played the piano in Madách Theatre (Budapest) from 1990 to 1993 and at the same time he worked at the Hungarian National Theatre as a pianist. In 1992 he entered the Hungarian National Song Festival's Top 10 with a composition for big band and symphony orchestra. From 1994 he took a break from classical piano and he founded the pop boy band Hip Hop Boyz. From 1993 he was the lyricist, composer, singer, and producer of the national number one and multiple award winning boy-band Hip Hop Boyz and performed at significant festivals (MIDEM, Total Dance, Bravo Festival) and was the opening act for Dr. Alban, East 17, Backstreet Boys, 'N Sync, DJ BoBo, No Mercy, Michael Jackson and other Hungarian bands and artists. Their records were released across Europe: Germany, the Netherlands, Spain, Poland, Slovakia, Slovenia and the Czech Republic. In 1999 he released his first solo album. After hosting of the classical concert series for the Hungarian Radio Symphony Orchestra in 2000 he moved to the U.S. and worked as a freelance producer and songwriter for Celine Dion, Anastacia and Tarkan. In 2003, once againback in Hungary, Egry produced several pop projects winning several awards and critical acclaim. In 2005 he co-founded Artofonic Records and worked as a producer, A&R manager. From 2005 he participated 'Hip Hop Boyz Retroshow' with over 200 performances around Hungary and the surrounding countries. In 2006 he started working on Sentimental Piano Concert - his debut album as a neo-romantic solo classical-crossover pianist and composer. He co-founded the Artofonic Chamber Orchestra in 2006.

== Awards won ==
- 1993-2005 Several gold, platinum and diamond albums (by retail sales)
- 2003-2005 As a producer of Hungarian pop projects: winner of "Record of the Year", "Best Emerging Artist" and "Performer of the Year" awards
- 1996 – Winner of Performer of the Year, Bravo- OTTO, Golden Giraffe (the “Hungarian Grammy”) and Popcorn Magazine public award see Hungarian Music Awards
- 1976-1991 Winner of several National Piano Competitions
