= Zone Music Reporter =

Zone Music Reporter (formerly New Age Reporter) is a website tracking New Age, world, and instrumental music. The site features weekly playlist, monthly airplay charts, and album reviews. Premium services are also offered to artists and their management compiling custom airplay reports for that artist. Around 2023, the site began to experience technical problems, although its managers have vowed to reconstitute and perpetuate the database.

== Awards ==
=== Past winners ===
The Zone Music Reporter sponsors the yearly ZMR Awards yearly (Formerly the NAR LifeStyle Music Awards) since 2004. Past winners include Marc Enfroy, Paul Adams, Michael Dulin, Jeff Oster, Bill Leslie, Jeff Pearce, Áine Minogue, Peter Kater, Will Ackerman, Starr Parodi, Ricky Kej, Al Conti, Michael DeMaria, Darlene Koldenhoven, Sangeeta Kaur, Aomusic, Kerani, Fiona Joy, AeTopus, Lis Addison, and Amethystium.

=== Categories ===
- Album of the Year
- Best Ambient Album
- Best Celtic Album
- Best Contemporary Instrumental Album
- Best Cover Art
- Best Dance/Dub/Club Album
- Best Electronic Album
- Best Groove / Chill Album
- Best Holiday Album
- Best Instrumental Album (Acoustic)
- Best Instrumental Album (Piano)
- Best Native American Album
- Best Neo-Classical Album
- Best New Artist
- Best Piano Album - Solo
- Best Piano Album - with Instrumentation
- Best Relaxation/Meditation Album
- Best Vocal Album
- Best World Album
