= Paul Adams (musician) =

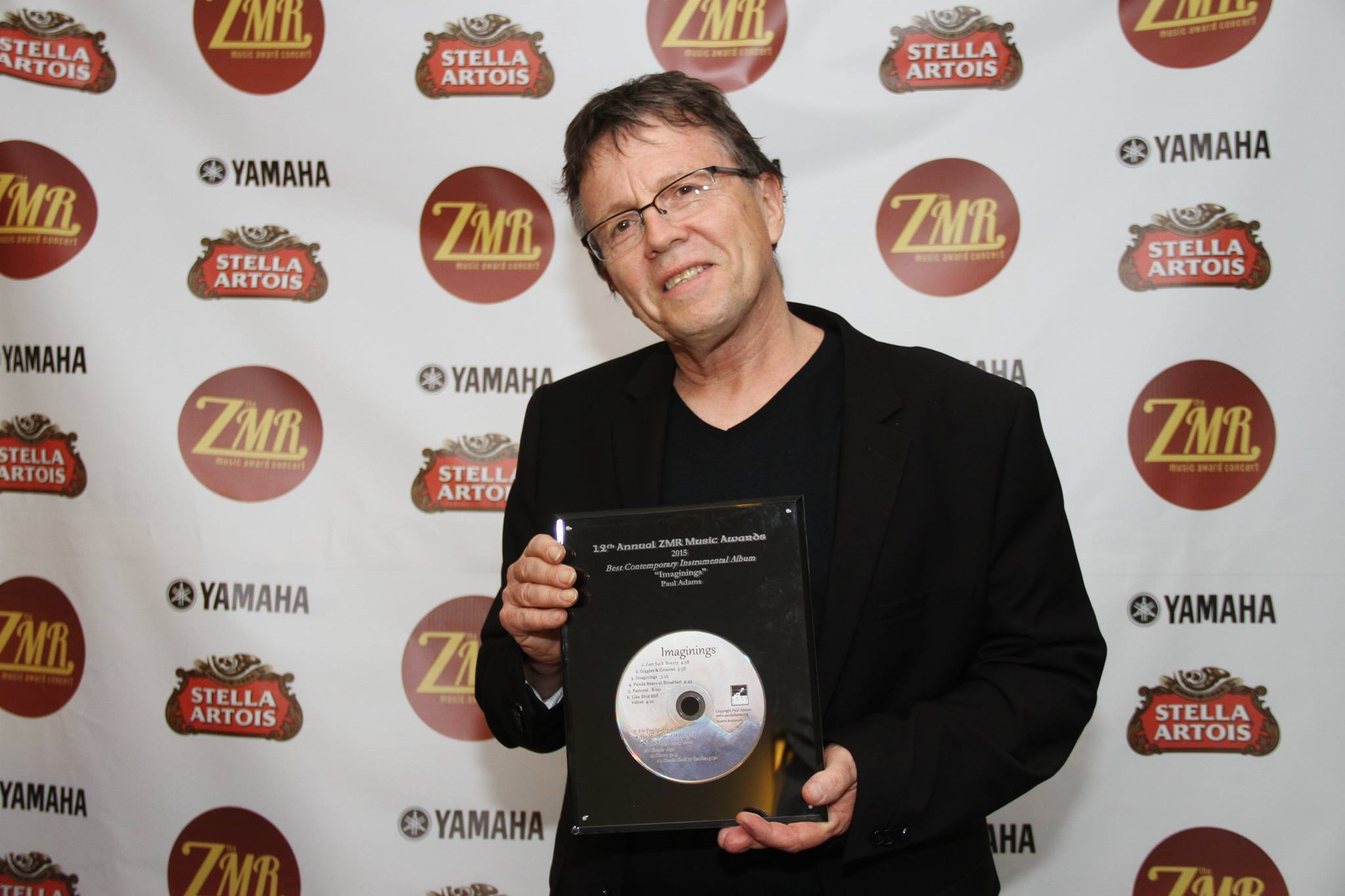
- Paul Adams in 2016 - Zone Music Awards, New Orleans

Background information
- Born: August 27, 1951 (age 74); Kokomo, Indiana, United States
- Genres: New-age, world fusion, fingerstyle guitar
- Occupations: Musician, composer, producer, music therapist, writer, luthier
- Instruments: Guitar, Native American flute, keyboards, percussion, banjo
- Years active: 1986–present
- Labels: Lakefront
- Website: pauladams.org

Paul Adams (born August 1951) is an American musician, writer and musical instrument builder.

== Early career ==
Adams began his foray into the arts by making stringed musical instruments such as guitars, banjos, basses, and dulcimers after he was introduced to the craft as an ethnomusicology student under Dr. Joel Maring at Southern Illinois University Carbondale.

== Composing ==
In the 1980s, Adams decided to start composing music and got a label deal with Nature Recordings/World Disc (now defunct). His first album, Various Waves, was placed in the Top Five of the Year by the syndicated Radio Show Musical Starstreams in the 1990s. The Metro Silicon Valley stated that "Adams is perhaps the most important New Age musician since George Winston."

Adams left the label after his first release in order to produce music in genres other than New Age. He spent some time working with John Golden of Centerfield Productions, whose main focus was the band jazz band Steps Ahead. Centerfield (now defunct) re-released Adams' second album, Wonder Dancing on Global Bop. After Centerfield folded, Adams took back control of his music.

In Tower Records' Pulse!, John Diliberto, the host of the Echoes radio program, called Adams' guitar playing on Wonder Dancing on Global Bop "Willfully eclectic with scintillating fretwork immersed in Latin African rhythms." The album Sleep won Native American album of the year at the Zone Music Reporter awards in New Orleans in 2013. His album Imaginings won Zone Music Reporter Contemporary album of the year in 2016. It was a foray in to world music with Pravin Godkhindi, the Australian musician Elizabeth Geyer, and David Hoffman. A follow-up album entitled Deeper Imaginings, a collaboration with Geyer, was released in November 2019. It was nominated New Age album of the year by the Independent Music Awards. Also on the album is Pravin Godkhindi, former Gentle Giant guitarist Gary Green and Alp Akmaz on Balabad.

In May 2016, Imaginings won Best Contemporary Instrumental Album of the year at the Zone Music Reporter Awards in New Orleans. The follow-up album, Deeper Imaginings, a collaboration with Australian musician Elizabeth Geyer, was released in November 2019. In July 2022, Adams and Geyer released the album Sanctuary. The New Age Music Guide in Belgium charted Sanctuary # 1 in July 2022, and later named Sanctuary 'New Age Album of the Year.'

Of the album This Curious Wonder, Americana Highways Magazine in Nashville writes, “PD Adams new album This Curious Wonder is newly released and wholly beautiful. Channeling a stillness that honors true teachers like Thich Nhat Hanh, this is a deeply lovable album."

== Discography ==
- 1990 - Various Waves
- 1993 - Wonder Dancing on Global Bop
- 1994 - A View From the Plain
- 1996 - In the Land Where I Come From
- 1997 - The Property of Water
- 2003 - This Christmas
- 2004 - Flute Meditations For Dreaming Clouds
- 2004 - Dance
- 2010 - Heavens
- 2013 - Sleep the dreaming flute
- 2015 - Imaginings

Played on:

- Wet Dark and Low by Kit Watkins
- From Energy to Stillness by David Hoffman
- Christmas in Your Heart by David Hoffman
- The Web Craig Peyton
- The Bridge by Australian Elizabeth Geyer
