= Himekami =

Japanese new age band

- Origin: Wakayanagi, Miyagi Japan
- Genres: New-age; ambient; world
- Years active: 1980–present
- Labels: Pony Canyon; Higher Octave Music
- Members: Yoshiki Hoshi
- Past members: Yoshiaki Hoshi
- Website: himekami.jp

Himekami (姫神) is a Japanese new-age music group, founded in 1980 by composer Yoshiaki Hoshi (星 吉昭) as Himekami Sensation (姫神せんせいしょん, Himekami Senseishon), changing its name to Himekami in 1984.

The band's name is derived from Mount Himekami in Morioka, Iwate Prefecture.

The group's current line-up consists of synthesizer player Yoshiki Hoshi (星 吉紀), son of Yoshiaki, and vocalists Wakako Nakajima, Tomoko Fujii, Junko Shiwa, and Yoriko Sano.

The album Ama Takami no Kuni (2008) was the first released by the group following founder Hoshi's death in October 2004. Higher Octave Music, before it was purchased by Virgin Records/EMI, released a number of its albums in North America.

== Albums ==
Logo

=== As Himekami Sensation ===
- Oku no Hosomichi (奥の細道) (1981, based on the work by Matsuo Bashō)
- Tōno (遠野) (1982)
- Himekami (姫神) (1982, main theme for the Tetsutarō Murano film Tono monogatari)
- Himekami Densetsu (姫神伝説) (1983)

=== As Himekami ===
- Mahoroba (まほろば) (1984, collaboration with YAS-KAZ)
- Kaidō (海道) (1985, collaboration with YAS-KAZ, theme of NHK Gurutto Kaidō 3000km)
- Hokuten Gensō (北天幻想, Northern Fantasy) (1986)
- Setsufu (雪譜, Snow Spectrum) (1987)
- Toki o Mitsumete (時をみつめて, Staring at the Time) (1988, soundtrack for the 32nd Yukunen Kurunen celebration)
- Fūdoki (風土記) (1989)
- Ihatove Hidakami (イーハトーヴォ日高見) (1990)
- Zipangu Himekami (ZIPANGU姫神, Jipangu Himekami) (1992)
- Homura (炎 -HOMURA-, Fire) (1993, the song "Kaze no Inori" on this album is used as the theme song for the "Homura Kikō" segment of the NHK Taiga Drama Homura Tatsu)
- Tsugaru (東日流) (1994)
- Mayoiga (マヨヒガ) (1995)
- Jōdō Mandala (浄土曼陀羅, Jōdō Mandara) (1995)
- Kaze no Jōmon (風の縄文) (1996)
- Kaze no Jōmon 2: Toki no Sora (風の縄文2 久遠(とき)の空) (1997)
- Jōmon Kairyū: Kaze no Jōmon3 (縄文海流 風の縄文3) (1998, winner of the 40th Japan Record Project Award)
- Seed (シード, Shīdo) (1999)
- Sennen Kairō (千年回廊, Millenium Cloister) (2000), including the song "Sennenno Inori" (Millennium Prayer)
- Gensō Suikoden III (幻想水滸伝III) (2002, opening theme for the original soundtrack)
- Aoi Hana (青い花, Blue Flower) (2003)
- Kaze no Densetsu (風の伝説, Legend of the Wind) (2004)
- Ama Takami no Kuni (天∴日高見乃國) (2008-02-04 (released via the web), 2008-04-02 (released in stores))

=== Singles ===
- Oku no Hosomichi (奥の細道) (1981)
- Kaidō o Yuku (海道を行く) (1985, collaboration with YAS-KAZ, theme of NHK Gurutto Kaidō 3000km)
- Tōku he Ikitai (遠くへいきたい) (1994, collaboration with Oyunna)
- Miagereba, Hanabira (見上げれば、花びら) (1996)
- Kamigami no Uta (神々の詩) (1998, theme song from the TBS series by the same title)
- Mirai no Hitomi (未来の瞳) (2000, theme song from the TBS series by the same title)
- Kiseki no Megumi (奇跡の恵み) (2011)
- Ryūhyō (流氷) (2011)
