= Chinmaya Dunster =

English sarod player (1954-2025)

- Born: 1954; Kent, England
- Died: 1 March 2025 (aged 70–71)
- Genres: Celtic rock indian rock
- Instrument: Sarod
- Website: http://www.chinmaya-dunster.com/

Chinmaya Dunster (1954 in Kent, England – 1 March 2025) was a sarod player whose compositions incorporate elements of Celtic and Hindustani music. He is an active environmentalist and performs concerts to foster awareness for saving ecosystems and wildlife. Dunster has released over twenty CDs since 1990.

== Biography ==
Born in 1954 in Kent, England, Dunster (né Stephen Dunster) attended Art college in Canterbury and pursued an independent study of classical guitar and composition throughout his adolescence and early twenties.

After finishing his formal education in the late seventies, Dunster left Europe and travelled through Afghanistan into northern India, where he became acquainted with classical Indian music and instrumentation. During spring break of his last year of art school in 1979, he flew off to Delhi where he attended an all-night performance of the sarod master, Ustad Amjad Ali Khan and subsequently spent the next thirteen years engaged in the study of the sarod both in London and India.

In 1982 he became a disciple of Osho (Bhagwan Shree Rajneesh).

As Hindustani musical tradition dictates that knowledge of technique and tradition is generally handed down from father to son, Dunster was initially challenged to find a teacher. In 1983 in London he became a disciple of Ustad Gurdev Singh (leading disciple of Ustad Amjad Ali Khan). After moving to Pune, India, in 1989, he studied for a further six years with Pandit Shekhar Borkar, a mainly self-taught sarod master.

In 1990, following an intense year of music making at the Osho International Meditation Resort in Pune, Dunster founded the east-west fusion band with Prem Joshua, Terra Incognita and released two albums under that name through New Earth Records. After several solo projects, Dunster then founded the Celtic Ragas Band, whose self-titled 2001 release attracted the favour of former Beatles member Sir Paul McCartney, who then invited Dunster to perform at his 2002 wedding to Heather Mills in Ireland.

The following year he and the Celtic Ragas Band performed a CONCERT FOR INDIA'S ENVIRONMENT at BVIEER, Pune, released as the live CD 'Fragrance of the East' on New Earth Records. The video of this concert, blended with interviews with environmentalists, Indian school children reading their own poems on nature and stunning footage of the Indian wilderness, was shown at numerous international film festivals, and aimed to spread awareness of the state of India’s environment:

In February 2010, Chinmaya Dunster formed the Green Ragas Band, playing at British Council, New Delhi (India) during the TERI YUVA Meet for environmental awareness, and the 2010 Commonwealth Games in Delhi. These performances resulted in Dunster's films of the concerts blended with information about climate change, threats to biodiversity and the difficulties faced by the rural poor in India.

Chinmaya Dunster resided in Totnes, UK with his partner Naveena Goffer and their daughter Koyal Goffer-Dunster. In 2020 together with producer Ben Fordham he created the project MELA [www.melamusic.co.uk ] which blends Chinmaya's melodies with electro/psytrance elements. His latest compositions were duets for classical guitar and sarod. A supporter of the aims of Extinction Rebellion, he did not use social media.

== Discography ==
- Terra Incognita (1 January 1991). No Goal But The Path. Köln, Germany: Tao Music. ASIN B0021H4EK2. OCLC 222031825.
- Dunster, Chinmaya (15 May 1995). Feng Shui Part 1. Tucson, AZ: Meistersinger Music. ASIN B00004SCRI. OCLC 40576938.
- Dunster, Chinmaya (20 August 1995). Feng Shui Part 2. Tucson, AZ: Meistersinger Music. ASIN B00004SCRJ. OCLC 40577104.
- Dunster, Chinmaya (15 March 1996). Lands of the Dawn. Forchheim, Germany: Meistersinger Musik. ASIN B000008SNF. OCLC 163140477.
- Terra Incognita (7 May 1996). Tribal Gathering. Santa Fe, NM: New Earth Records. ASIN B0000009CG. OCLC 781206424.
- Dunster, Chinmaya; Jamie, Vidroha (24 November 1998). Celtic Ragas. Santa Fe, NM: New Earth Records. ASIN B00000G435. OCLC 658939743.
- Dunster, Chinmaya; Bhakti (2000). The Beloved-Yoga of Devotion. Santa Fe, NM: Malimba Records. ASIN B000066CD0.
- Dunster, Chinmaya (19 December 2000). Feng shui : the eight-fold path. Santa Fe, NM: New Earth Records. ASIN B0000521Y3. OCLC 46831187.
- Dunster, Chinmaya (4 September 2001). Yoga: On Sacred Ground. Santa Fe, NM: New Earth Records. ISBN 978-3-933712-31-8. OCLC 48849654.
- Dunster, Chinmaya (3 September 2002). Sacred Temples of India. Santa Fe, NM: New Earth Records. ASIN B00006EXDY. OCLC 51707421.
- Dunster, Chinmaya; Sirus, Sangit (2003). Spiral Dance. Forchheim, Germany: Meistersinger Musik. ASIN B0000287AQ. OCLC 163140708.
- Dunster, Chinmaya; Celtic Ragas Band (7 October 2003). Karma Circles. Santa Fe, NM: New Earth Records. ASIN B0000D1FDO. OCLC 70688794.
- Dunster, Chinmaya; Akasha (2004). Akasha: Yoga Spirit. Hawai'i, US: Malimba Records. ASIN B00097DX7G. OCLC 65390296.
- Dunster, Chinmaya; Celtic Ragas Band (1 February 2005). Fragrance of the East: Live in India. Santa Fe, NM: New Earth Records. ASIN B00069MQ6G.
- Dunster, Chinmaya; Kumar, Niladri (11 October 2005). Yoga Lounge. Santa Fe, NM: New Earth Records. ASIN B000B9EYAC. OCLC 68136146.
- Dunster, Chinmaya (10 April 2007). Buddha Moon. Santa Fe, NM: New Earth Records. ASIN B000NVKY8Y. OCLC 148071536.
- Dunster, Chinmaya; Akasha (20 March 2007). Akasha: Om Shanti. Hawai'i, US: Malimba Records. ASIN B000MEYJDS. OCLC 259809550.
- Dunster, Chinmaya (13 October 2009). Land of Buddhas. Santa Fe, NM: New Earth Records. ASIN B002L9PQCU. OCLC 437312799.
- Dunster, Chinmaya (16 March 2010). Ragas Relax. Maui, Hawai'i: Malimba Records. ASIN B0033HKCC8. OCLC 500831696.
- Dunster, Chinmaya (13 October 2011). Gaia's Garden. Santa Fe, NM: New Earth Records. ASIN B005HUY8TC. OCLC 756605899.
- Dunster, Chinmaya (13 October 2013). Meditation Ragas. Santa Fe, NM: New Earth Records. ASIN B00CMQXU0W. OCLC 853501185.
- Dunster, Chinmaya (March 2014). At the Edge. Hawai'i, US: Global Spirit Music. ASIN B00JMYIXT0.
- Dunster, Chinmaya (6 June 2014). Dance Your Way to God. Hawai'i, US: Global Spirit Music. ASIN B00KVUJ4JM.
- Dunster, Chinmaya (15 February 2016). Rarities-Rare and Unreleased Recordings 1990-2015. Auckland, NZ: Chinmaya Dunster. ASIN B01BV33VTQ.
- Dunster, Chinmaya (12 October 2018). Bulleh Says. Auckland, NZ: Chinmaya Dunster. ASIN B07JFVWNHY.
- Dunster, Chinmaya (22 February 2019). Mindfulness. Totnes, UK: New Earth Records. ASIN B07MWJ9N13.
- Dunster, Chinmaya (10 February 2019). The World's Treasure. Totnes, UK: Chinmaya Dunster. ASIN B07NTKB214.
- Dunster, Chinmaya (10 February 2021). Ragas Relax 2. Totnes, UK: Malimba. ASIN B08SQ38VPC.
- Dunster, Chinmaya (2022). Mazaj (vibe). Totnes, UK: CD Baby. ASIN B0BMMW9JZK.
- Dunster, Chinmaya (2022). Duet. Totnes, UK: CD Baby. ASIN B0B7CBNQGZ.
- Dunster, Chinmaya (February 2023). The Akasha Project. Totnes, UK: Malimba. ASIN B0BTHMPX2R.
- Dunster, Chinmaya (February 2023). Celtistan Journey. Totnes, UK: CD Baby. ASIN B0BYZQV34Y.

== See also ==
- Celtic music
- New-age music
- Fusion music
