= Prem Joshua =

German musician (born 1958)

Prem Joshua (Hindi: प्रेम जोशुआ) is a German musician, active since 1969.

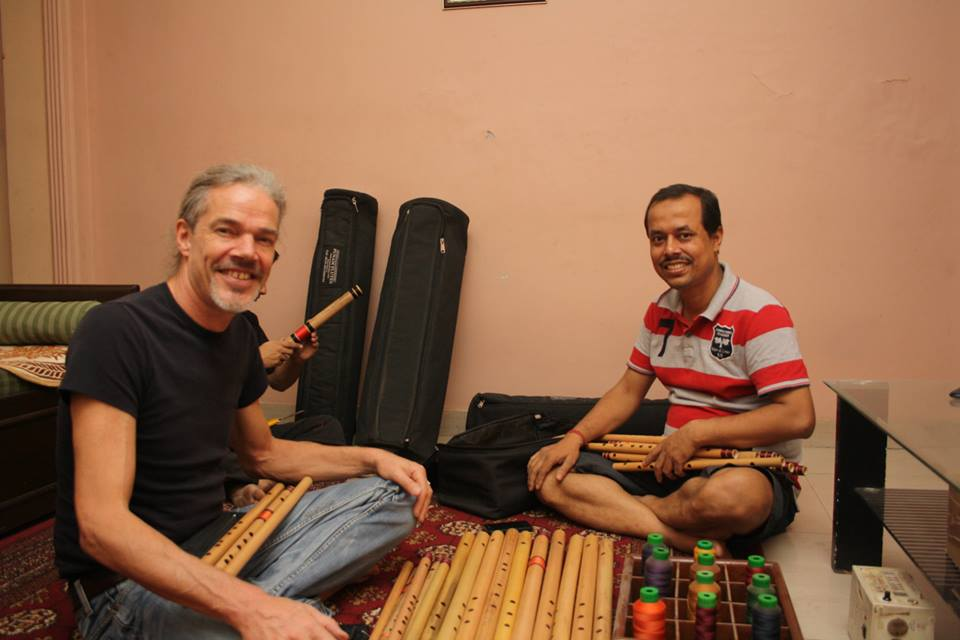
Prem Joshua with Indian Flute maker Subhash Thakur

Born in the south of Germany in 1958, Joshua learned to play the flute at the age of five and played this instrument and the saxophone since the age of 12 in various local bands. At the age of 18, he traveled overland to India studying the indigenous folk music of countries along the way. Joshua was the name his parents gave him, he later was given the prefix "Prem" from his spiritual master Osho, dropping the family name, to remind him of the essence of Love (Prem means "Love" in Hindi).

Prem Joshua cites sitarist Ravi Shankar as an early musical influence. On reaching India, Joshua learned to play the sitar with Ustad Usman Khan as well as the Indian Bansoori (Indian bamboo flute).

Osho inspired him and his music. His website states that "In the presence of this man with a long white beard, eyes as deep as the ocean and a strong sense of humor, he came in touch with the art of the “inner music” - Silence. This was really coming home!"

Throughout his career, he has experimented with various forms of music, creating a blend of the East and the West. He has also worked extensively with other producers, making remixes of his own songs and infusing traditional Hindustani acoustic instruments with lounge and trance beats. His music has immensely contributed to the Asian Underground and fusion scene.

In 1991, Prem Joshua, Kora player, British Ravi, and Sarod player, Chinmaya Dunster launched their project “Terra Incognita”. They released two albums, "No Goal But The Path" and "Tribal Gathering". He subsequently released four solo albums and co-founded the band, “Hamsafar”, with which he released the album - "Lifeprints" in 1998.

HAMSAFAR split up in 2000, after the band had reached quite a peak in their career, playing extensive concerts in Germany, France, Holland, Denmark and Italy and a well received concert at the "Shantipi"-festival in Israel in front of 10.000 people.

After the split, Prem Joshua played in smaller formations with Manish Vyas and dancer Hina Sarojini. Until he formed "Prem Joshua & Band" in 2007 and started touring in Europe and even more in India, where he gained quite a reputation in fusing classical Indian music with western contemporary styles. In his records, Prem Joshua had begun to experiment with genres like drum and bass, lounge, and trance, while still focusing on classical Indian music.

== Terra Incognita band members ==
- Prem Joshua: Sitar, Bansoori, Saxophone, Vocals
- Ravi: Kora, Guitars, Keyboards, Percussions, Vocals
- Chinmaya Dunster: Sarod

other members:

- Rishi Vlote: Drums, Percussions
- Kamal: Bass, Keyboards, Vocals

== Hamsafar band members ==
- Prem Joshua: Sitar, Bansoori, Saxophone, Vocals, 1994 - 2000
- Chintan Schmidt-Relenberg: Bass, Percussions, 1994 - 2000
- Nadama Novak: Keyboards, Percussions, 1994 - 1999
- Jo Shiro Shunyam Körber: Guitars, Vocals, Percussions 1994 - 1998
- Rishi Vlote: Drums, Percussions, Samples, 1994 - 2000

Other Members:

- Manish Vyas: Tabla, Vocals, Keyboards, Percussions 1997 - 2000
- Bhakta: Guitars, Groovebox 1998
- Dhinesh Allan Mattuck: Guitars, Keyboards, Percussions: 1999-2000

== Prem Joshua & Band members ==
- Prem Joshua: Sitar, Bansoori, Saxophone, Vocals, Percussions
- Chintan Schmidt-Relenberg: Keyboards, Loops, Percussions, Vocals
- Raul Sengupta: Tabla, Percussions, Vocals
- Satgyan Fukuda: Bass, Vocals, Percussions

== Discography ==
- Terra Incognita - No Goal But The Path - New Earth Records, 1991
- Terra Incognita - Tribal Gathering - New Earth Records, 1992
- Prem Joshua - Tales of a Dancing River - New Earth Records, 1993
- Prem Joshua - Hamsafar - New Earth Records, 1994
- Hamsafar - Lifeprints - Renudo, 1998
- Prem Joshua - Desert Visions - New Earth Records, 1995
- Prem Joshua - Secret of the Wind - New Earth Records, 1996
- Prem Joshua - Mudra - White Swan Records, 1998
- Prem Joshua - Sky Kisses Earth - White Swan Records, 1999
- Prem Joshua - Dance of Shakti - White Swan Records, 2001
- Prem Joshua - with Manish Vyas - Water Down The Ganges, Medial Music, 2001
- Prem Joshua - Shiva Moon - Remixed by Maneesh de Moor - Medial Music, 2003
- Prem Joshua - Dakini Lounge - Prem Joshua Remixed - White Swan Records, 2003
- Prem Joshua - Yatri - Medial Music, 2004
- Prem Joshua & Chintan - Ahir, Medial Music, 2006
- Prem Joshua - Taranga - White Swan Records, 2006
- Prem Joshua & Band - In Concert, 2008
- Prem Joshua & Band - Luminous Secrets - Link to Album on Official Website, 2010
- Prem Joshua & Chintan - Kashi: Songs from the India Within", 2014
- Prem Joshua - Breath of Voavah, 2017
- Prem Joshua - Winds of Grace - Link to Album on www.spotify.com, 2020
- Prem Joshua - Soma, 2021

== Sources ==
- Prem Joshua - Albums
- White Swan Records - Featured Artists - Prem Joshua
- Allmusic
