= Terry Oldfield =

English composer

- Born: Terence Oldfield; 12 August 1949 (age 76); Palmers Green, North London, UK
- Occupation: Composer
- Website: www.terryoldfield.com

Terence Oldfield (born 12 August 1949) is an English composer, and brother to Sally and Mike Oldfield.

== History ==
=== Early life ===
Born in Palmers Green, North London, Oldfield and his siblings were raised in the Roman Catholic faith of their mother, Maureen. Oldfield spent his childhood partly in Dublin and partly in Reading, Berkshire. He later attended Douai School a Benedictine monastery school and also spent a few terms at the Oratory School in Woodcote, Oxfordshire. His earliest musical experiences were in the myriad of folk clubs that sprang up in the UK during the late 1960s and early 1970s, listening to the songs of Leonard Cohen, Bert Jansch, John Renbourn and Bob Dylan.

Oldfield left school at 16 to travel the world and worked as a roadie for various bands including The Byrds. During an extended stay on the Greek island of Hydra, he took up his first musical instrument, the flute. "I think it was learning to play in this way, with no formal guidance, that allowed me to develop the ability to compose music. I spent many happy days improvising tunes and discovering scales and arpeggios for myself, and soon started to teach myself to write these things down". Terry's only formal music training was in Agra, India, where he spent some time learning to play the tabla.

In the early 1970s, Terry and his brother Mike formed a band called 'Barefoot' (or 'Barefeet') playing rock'n'roll at colleges and clubs throughout the UK. Mike later went on to record the highly successful Tubular Bells and Terry played the flute in the live performance at the Queen Elizabeth Hall on 25 June 1973.

Terry also appears on Mike's albums Hergest Ridge (woodwind – uncredited), Ommadawn (pan-pipes) and extensively on Incantations (flute).

=== Solo career ===
Terry, his brother Mike and his sister Sally all completed the Exegesis Programme Large Group Awareness Training course. Terry recorded a piece of flute music which was used to accompany the last section of the course.

Oldfield's career began in earnest when he was asked by the BBC to compose music for a series called Great Railway Journeys of the World. Since then Oldfield has composed music for over 50 film and TV productions, receiving two Emmy nominations for Land of the Tiger and Twilight of the Dreamtime and a BAFTA nomination for the BBC series Kingdom of the Ice Bear. He also worked on Meerkats United, which in a National Television Poll was voted 'Best Wildlife Film Ever'.

Oldfield had a relationship with New World Music, one of the world's leading 'World' music labels, for over 10 years and has a back catalogue of over 15 recordings. In 2001, Oldfield signed a multi-record contract with New Earth Records in Santa Fe, New Mexico. His work contains a wide range of ideas and influences and has sold over one million units worldwide.

In 2001, Oldfield moved to Australia.

== Discography ==
=== Albums ===
- Sunshine Holidays – 1983
- In Search of the Trojan War – 1985
- Cascade – 1986
- Reverence – 1986
- Return to Treasure Island – 1987
- In the Presence of Light – 1987
- Resonance – 1988
- Star of Heaven – 1989
- Spirit of the Rainforest – 1990
- Angel – 1990
- Zen – 1991
- Illumination – 1992
- Spiral Waves – 1992
- Out of the Depths – 1993
- Spirit of Africa – 1993
- Australia – 1994
- Spirit of Tibet – 1994
- Earth Spirit – 1995
- Icon – 1995
- Theme for the Telford Time Machine – 1996
- Spirit of India – 1996
- South East Asia – 1997
- All The Rivers Gold – 1999
- Music for Wildlife – 2000
- Reflections – The Best of Terry Oldfield 1985–1995 – 2000
- Across the Universe – 2000
- Spirit of the World – 2000
- Turning Point 2002
- A Time for Peace – 2003
- Yoga Harmony – 2004
- Celt – 2004
- De Profundis / Out of the Depths II – 2005
- Ethereal – 2005
- Reiki Harmony – 2006
- Om (with Medwyn Goodall) – 2007
- Labyrinth – 2007
- Mandala: Circle of Chant – 2008
- Yoga Nidra (with Soraya Saraswati) – 2009
- Silent Night, Peaceful Night – 2010
- Healing Sound Journey (with Soraya Saraswati) – 2011
- Journey into Space (with Mike Oldfield) – 2012
- Peaceful Hearts (with Soraya Saraswati) – 2013
- Namaste (with Soraya Saraswati) – 2016
- Sky Dancer (with Carlos Garo) – 2017
- Temple Moon (with Soraya Saraswati ) – 2017
- On Fire – 2018
- Rhapsody – 2018
- Soundscapes For Awakening – 2018
- Forever One (with Soraya Saraswati ) – 2019
- Healing Hands Subliminal Music For Massage – 2019
- Music For Relaxation – 2019
