= Yoshiaki Hoshi =

Background information
- Also known as: Himekami
- Born: Yoshiaki Hoshi; March 16, 1946
- Origin: Wakayanagi, Miyagi, Japan
- Died: October 1, 2004 (aged 58)
- Genres: New-age
- Occupations: Composer, musician
- Instrument: Synthesizer
- Years active: 1981–2004
- Labels: Pony Canyon; Columbia; EMI; King Records
- Formerly of: Himekami
- Website: himekami.jp

Yoshiaki Hoshi (星 吉昭, Hoshi Yoshiaki; March 16, 1946 – October 1, 2004), born in Wakayanagi, Miyagi, Japan, was a Japanese musician, composer, arranger and synthesizer player, best known for his band Himekami.

== Music career ==
Hoshi won the 1971 Victor Electronic Music Contest, and founded Himekami Sensation in 1980. His debut album was Oku no Hosomichi, released in 1981.

In 1984, the band’s name was changed to Himekami. Hoshi was known for being very friendly with his fans, and thanking them for purchasing his works.

Hoshi’s music was basically electronic, new-age with sounds of nature and elements of traditional Japanese music.

== Death ==
Hoshi died of a heart attack on October 1, 2004, at 1:21am. His funeral service was held on October 24, 2004, at a Shinto shrine in Hiraizumi, Iwate Prefecture.

== Discography ==
- Oku No Hosomichi (1981)
- Tohno (1982)
- Himekami (1982)
- Tohno Monogatari (1982) (soundtrack)
- Himekami Densetsu (1983)
- Mahoroba (1984) (with Yas-Kaz)
- Kaido (1985) (with Yas-Kaz) (soundtrack)
- Hokuten Genso (1986)
- Himekami Special (1986)
- Setsufu (1987)
- Toki Wo Mitsumete (1988) (soundtrack)
- Himekami Fudoki (1989)
- Moonwater (1989)
- Ihatovo Hidakami (1990)
- Snow Goddess (1991)
- Zipangu Himekami (1992)
- Homura (1993)
- Tsugaru (1994)
- Mayoiga (1995)
- Himekami Johdo Mandara (1995)
- Kaze No Jomon (1996)
- Kaze No Jomon II: Toki No Sora (1997)
- Kaze No Jomon III: Jomon Kairyuu (1998)
- Shinra Bansho (1998)
- Seed (1999)
- Sennen Kairo (2000)
- Aoi-Hana (2003)
