= Kerani =

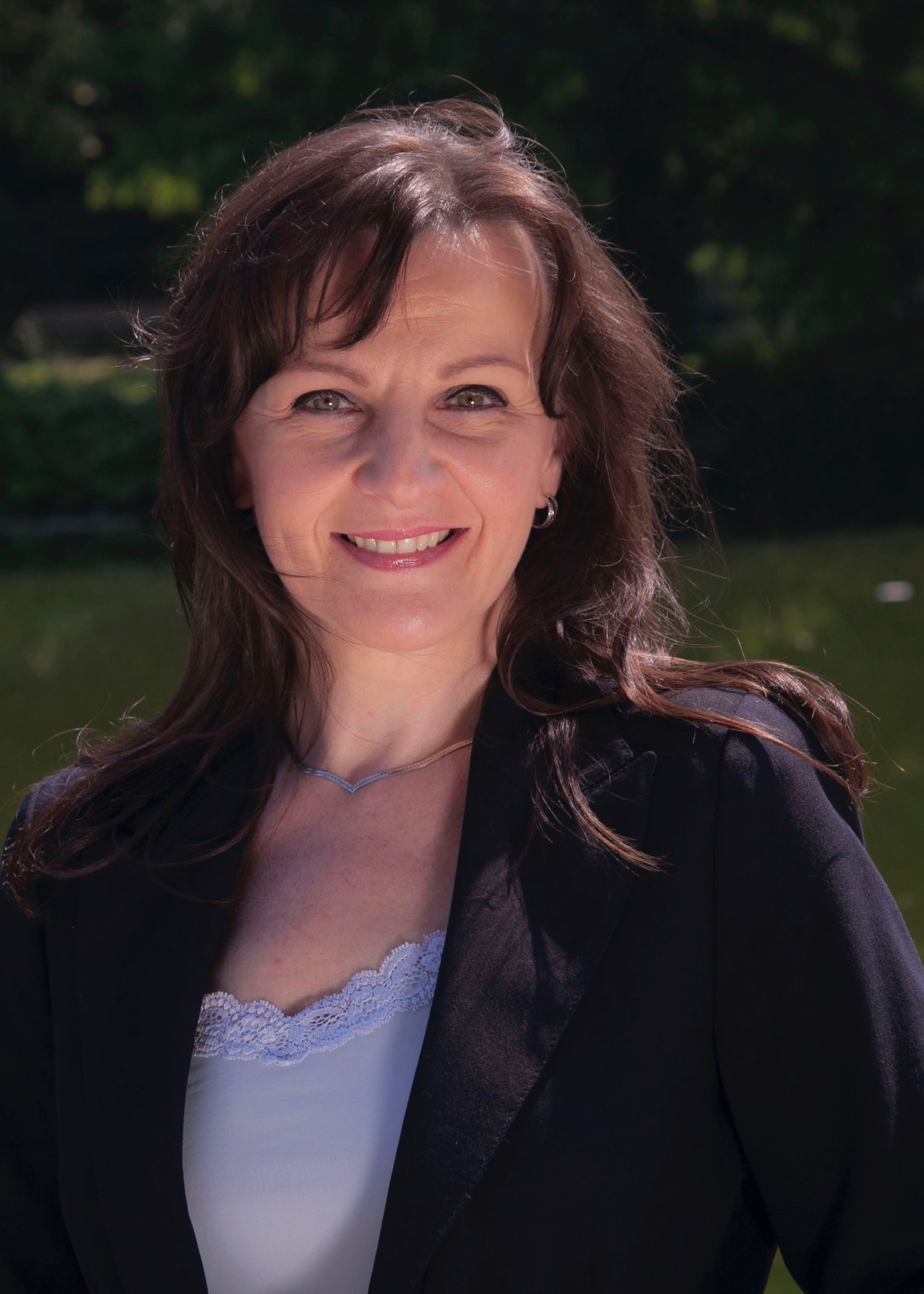
Kerani

Kerani (born 1968) is a Dutch composer, orchestrator, and producer of Hungarian and German descent. Her music combines orchestral textures with melodic elements influenced by classical music, particularly the Romantic and Impressionist eras. Kerani consistently opts for live recordings, featuring string sections and orchestral instruments, adding authenticity to her creations.

Her work is heard worldwide on the radio and across all streaming platforms, as well as on SiriusXM Spa , Music Choice and the Health Care Channel , where it is used in hospitals and hospices to support patient wellbeing. Her compositions are also featured on television in various European countries.

Across 14 self produced albums, she has established a distinct body of work built on live orchestration, combining classical influence with modern production. Her music is defined by clarity, depth, and a commitment to real musicians over synthetic shortcuts.

Alongside her recorded catalogue, she creates bespoke compositions for immersive environments, including light festivals and historical themed events.

== Biography ==
Kerani, born in Belgium to Hungarian/German parents, lives in the Netherlands. She is the founder and head of Kerani Music, a music recording, multi-media and production company. Additionally, she oversees Toon Zaal 11 a contemporary art gallery. Both companies are based in the same location near Maastricht.

== Early life ==
Kerani spent her formative years in Brussels, Belgium, alongside her three older brothers. When Kerani was four, her father bought a secondhand piano, which immediately captivated her. Displaying a remarkable ability to play tunes by ear, her parents recognized her musical aptitude and soon enrolled her in music school. From that point forward, music became the central theme in Kerani's life.

At the age of 18, Kerani teamed up with a couple of studio musicians to record her instrumental compositions Seagullsong and Oblivion. The single got national airplay and Oblivion became the tune of a breakfast show on Radio 2 Flanders. In this period, she also performed as lead vocalist and keyboardist in a cover band called Liaison.

== Career ==
In 2011, Kerani's professional musical career soared as she undertook the composition of soundtracks for several documentary films commissioned by the Historical Society of the Roerstreek in the Netherlands. During the same year, she unveiled her debut new age album, Wings of Comfort. Just one year later, her sophomore release, The Journey, made its debut. Both albums garnered significant airplay and contributed to Kerani's burgeoning reputation in the music industry.

In the run-up to the release of her third album Arctic Sunrise in 2014, Kerani wrote the soundtrack to several documentaries commissioned by the NWO - the Dutch Organization for Scientific Research. She also re-orchestrated a large set of children's songs for an instruction DVD for disabled children, called 't Steyntje zingt. Arctic Sunrise went to #2 on the International Zone Music Reporter Chart for new-age music, got airplay on hundreds of radio stations worldwide, was a Top 10 album on the annual ZMR rankings, and won the ZMR Neo-Classical Album of the Year Award. From this album, the classical track Far Away from Home was re-orchestrated, recorded and published for windband by Bronsheim Music.

In 2015, Kerani launched her fourth concept and bestseller album, Equilibrium The album received a nomination for the Best Neo-Classical New Age Album by the ZMR and was also nominated for Best Electronic Album by One World Music Radio in the UK.

In 2017, Kerani released her fifth concept album, called Stardust. Stardust is a space-themed album that was recorded with Roermonds Orkest De Symphonie, conducted by Christiaan Janssen, Gemengd Vocaal Ensemble Canto Rinato, conducted by Anton Kropivšek. In total, 60 musicians participated in this elaborate project, which was led by executive producer Arno Op den Camp, and supported by multi-Grammy and Latin Grammy Award winning producer Kabir Sehgal. While receiving many accolades from the international press and holding the #1 position in the ZMR International Top 100 Radio Airplay Chart during the months of June and July 2017, Stardust got nominated in 2 categories by the ZMR: New Age Album of the Year 2017 and Best Neo-Classical Album.

One year later, Kerani launched her sixth neoclassical album, called Small Treasures, a collection of musical inspirations which found their origin in experiences that have affected Kerani's life. This makes Small Treasures her most personal work to this day. Small Treasures was recorded with a string quartet, supplemented with a select number of guest artists, such as Grammy winning Canadian flautist Ron Korb, Irish singer songwriter Chanele McGuinness and Brazilian soprano coloratura and guitarist Carla Maffioletti. Just like its predecessor, Small Treasures held the #1 position in the ZMR International Top 100 Radio Airplay Chart for 2 months. The album won the ZMR Music Award for Best Neo-Classical Album of 2018.

September 2020 - Almost two years after the release of Small Treasures, Kerani returned with an epic body of work called Sands of Time. Inspired by Greek mythology, the music on this album describes the most beautiful elements that brought forth life on earth, such as Love, Beauty, Light, and Wisdom. “The myths and legends of the ancient Greek may be archaic, but their human aspect is still valid. We should use our love and knowledge to create beauty and bring peace to the world.”, says Kerani. Sands of Time got voted Best Neo-Classical Album of 2020 by the jury of One World Music Radio and by the broadcasters and radio hosts of the Zone Music Reporter.

In 2022, Kerani released The Water of Life, a concept album celebrating the elemental power of water. The project featured The Magic Strings Quartet and the soaring vocals of Belgian-born soprano Gwenaelle Ghislain. One of the standout tracks, “The Blue Wonder,” was selected as the soundtrack for a laser show featured during Enchanted Gardens, a popular three-week open-air event held annually at Kasteeltuinen Arcen in the Netherlands. Kerani was also commissioned to compose a series of original pieces and immersive soundscapes specifically designed to reflect the diverse botanical landscapes featured in the event.

In 2023, she released The Journey of Life, a studio album developed in partnership with the German sync licensing company RipCue Music GmbH. This collection continued her signature cinematic style, offering rich, emotive compositions crafted for both listening and media use.

Kerani’s 2024 album Silent Heart marked a stylistic shift toward healing, peace and introspection. Returning to her love for the piano, she composed a suite of delicate, emotionally resonant pieces, subtly accompanied by the Belgian Awouters Quintet. The album departed from the grandeur of her earlier orchestrations, revealing a more intimate, contemplative sound.

In 2025, Kerani composed bespoke music for Enchanted Gardens , an annual light festival held at the Kasteeltuinen Arcen in North Limburg, the Netherlands. The laser and light installations were synchronised with her compositions. This collaboration led to the album Luminous Paths, created with Dutch composer and pianist Egbert Derix .

Early 2026, Kerani developed a personal project titled Almost Here , a 6 track atmospheric orchestral EP featuring strings, piano, oboe, and solo cello, which explores themes of anticipation, distance, and arrival.

October 2026: Kerani launches her 14th album Flora Vocor. Originally composed for Enchanted Gardens, the light festival at Kasteeltuinen Arcen , the album follows the Roman goddess Flora as its unseen guide. It is a collection of different landscapes, moods and inspirations, each revealing another facet of Flora's magical world.

== Music for media ==
Kerani also produces music customised for the worldwide television and film industry in collaboration with her German publisher "RipCue Music" Her notable works include Celtic Otherworld, a 31-track album, and "Journey of Life", a 12-track album.

== Discography ==
1. Wings of Comfort (album 2011)
2. The Journey (album 2012)
3. Echo of our Souls (single 2013)
4. Wonderful Peace/Stralande Jul (single 2013)
5. Arctic Sunrise (album 2014)
6. The Story of Christmas (single 2014)
7. Equilibrium (album 2015)
8. Days of Yore (single 2016)
9. Stars (single 2016)
10. The Little Shepherd's Flute (single 2016)
11. Stardust (album 2017)
12. Drive (single 2018)
13. Small Treasures (album 2018)
14. City Skylines (single 2019)
15. A Christmas Wish (single 2019)
16. One World (single 2020)
17. Summer Romance - featured on New Beginnings - OWMR charity album (2020)
18. Sands of Time (album 2020)
19. The Crystal Dancer (single 2021)
20. Celtic Otherworld (album 2022) published by RipCue Music GmbH
21. The Water of Life (album 2022)
22. Sailing (single 2023)
23. Journey of Life (album 2023) published by RipCue Music GmbH
24. Lucky Charm (single 2023) - ft. Susan E. Mazer and Dallas Smith
25. Silent Heart (album 2024)
26. Luminous Paths (album 2025) - in collaboration with Egbert Derix
27. Almost Here (EP 2026)
28. Flora Vocor (album 2026)
