= David & Steve Gordon =

American music duo

David & Steve Gordon are an American new-age and chill-out music recording duo.

== Career ==
The Gordons' first album, Misty Forest Morning, was released in 1982, featuring mainly piano and acoustic guitars, with some synthesizer and sounds of nature they recorded in Sequoia National Forest, the location that was the inspiration for the name of their record label, Sequoia Records Their second album Peaceful Evening and several more albums in a similar style followed soon after, then in 1985 they branched out into electronic spacemusic with Astral Journey and Celestial Suite.

In 1987 they returned to nature-inspired music with Garden of Serenity, the first of several releases in their Inner Music series of albums that featured longer meditative compositions. (A sequel, Garden of Serenity II, followed in 1998.) The early 1990s saw another of their electronic spacemusic releases with Music of the Tarot.

Beginning in 1994 with Sacred Earth Drums, David & Steve Gordon branched out into world fusion music, adding African, Middle Eastern and Native American drums and percussion plus Native American flute and Incan pan pipes to the mix, along with acoustic and electric guitars, synthesizers, and continuing their use of sounds of nature as musical elements. The song titles and liner notes portrayed the story of a mythical shaman who journeys to the spirit world to find healing for his people and for the Earth. Sacred Earth Drums became the top-selling drumming album in the New Age market for both 1994 and 1995 and by 2002 had sold over 300,000 units. Following a sequel in 1996 titled Sacred Spirit Drums, their 1999 release Drum Medicine entered Billboard's Top New Age Albums chart in April, 2000, and also in 2000, received the Coalition of Visionary Retailers Record of the Year and Best World Album awards and the New Age Voice Native Heart Award and was listed in the top 5 albums of New Age specialty distributors for two years.

In 2006, the Gordon brothers released Soothing Sanctuary, ambient music with nature sounds, a re-version of the earlier release "Sanctuary" (so stated in the liner notes) with new arrangements and remastering. Also in 2006 came Shaman's Vision Journey, featuring shamanic drum beats and mantras in the languages of cultures from around the world, including Mayan, Sanskrit, Lakota and Tibetan chants. In 2007 and 2008, they released a pair of 25th anniversary retrospectives, Sound Peace, focusing on meditative selections, and Earth Drum, a collection of drum and native flute tracks packaged with a DVD of wilderness scenery from national parks around the USA set to the music of the compilation album. Earth Drum was awarded the 2009 Coalition of Visionary Retailers awards for Album of the Year and Best World Album.

David & Steve Gordon released two albums of world drum and percussion music in 2009, an upbeat recording titled Drum Cargo: Rhythms of Fire, and an album of quiet drum beats with crystal bowls and native flutes titled Meditation Drum, that according to the liner notes is intended to encourage meditation and relaxation. In 2010 they returned to Native American flute music with the album Gratitude.

== Discography ==
=== Full-length albums ===
- 1982 – Misty Forest Morning
- 1982 – Peaceful Evening
- 1983 – Radiant Sea (out of print)
- 1984 – Beside the Laughing River (out of print)
- 1984 – Still Waters, Clear Sky (out of print)
- 1985 – Astral Journey (out of print)
- 1986 – Celestial Suite (out of print)
- 1986 – Lightspring (out of print)
- 1987 – Garden of Serenity
- 1988 – Oneness
- 1993 – Music of the Tarot
- 1994 – Sacred Earth Drums
- 1996 – Sacred Spirit Drums
- 1997 – Garden of Serenity II
- 1998 – Ancient Power (Steve Gordon and Deborah Martin)
- 1999 – Drum Medicine
- 2002 – Drum Prayer (Steve Gordon)
- 2002 – Sacred Drum Visions
- 2003 – Heart of Peace
- 2004 – Garden of Serenity III
- 2005 – Pillow Music
- 2006 – Soothing Sanctuary
- 2007 – Shaman's Vision Journey
- 2008 – Earth Drum – The 25th Anniversary Collection, Vol. 1
- 2008 – Yoga Planet
- 2009 – Drum Cargo – Rhythms of Fire
- 2009 – Sound Peace – The 25th Anniversary Collection, Vol. 2
- 2009 – Nirvana Groove
- 2009 – Meditation Drum
- 2010 – Gratitude
- 2011 – Groove Tribe

=== DVD ===
- 2008 – Earth Drum Visions

=== Compilations produced ===
- 2001 – Musical Healing
- 2004 – Cafe de Luna, Volumes 1 & 2, 2003–2004
- 2004 – World Groove Mix
- 2005 – Yoga Salon
- 2005 – Tropical Chill
- 2006 – Chakra Healing Zone
- 2006 – Perfect Balance
- 2006 – Yoga Moods
- 2006 - Chakra Healing Zone
- 2007 – Angels Voices
- 2007 – Hotel Tara, the Intimate Side of Buddha-Lounge, Volumes 1 & 2, 2005–2007
- 2008 – The Celtic Lounge, Volumes 1–3, 2006–2008
- 2008 – Buddha-Lounge, Volumes 1–7, 2001–2010
