= Elizabeth Butler (musician) =

American singer-songwriter (born 1960)

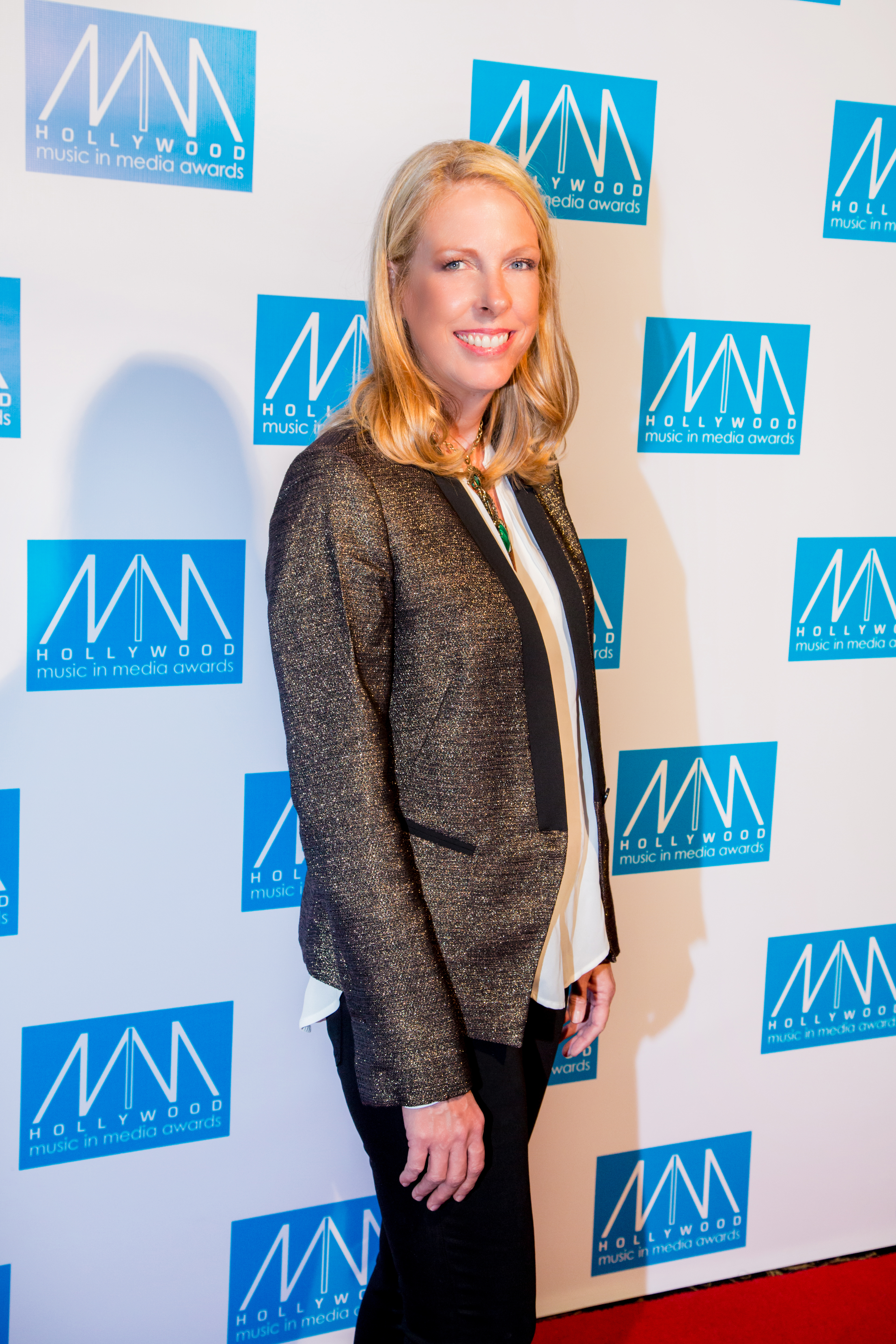
- Butler at HMMA Awards, 2014
- Born: August 12, 1960 (age 66); Savannah, Georgia, U.S.
- Occupations: Singer; songwriter; musician
- Years active: 1981–present
- Musical career
- Genres: Folk; Americana
- Instruments: Vocals; Guitar
- Website: www.ebutlermusic.com

Elizabeth Butler (born August 12, 1960) is an American singer-songwriter and musician whose musical style has been generally classified as Americana, pop, and folk.

== Career ==
In 2004 Butler founded Running Home Records based in Houston, Texas. She was performing with Running Home, an Americana-country-jazz duo with Suzanne Comeaux Bucher that quickly garnered airplay and a widespread fan base. They performed for several years, but both were married and had children, so they put their music project on hold.

They released their debut album, Running Home, in 2006. It received international radio airplay on college radio stations, most notably in the United Kingdom, Australia, and the U.S.

Love & Loss & Stuff Like That, Butler's sophomore album released in 2014, received favorable reviews. Her single "Love Over Logic" won Best Country Song at the Indie Music Channel Awards in 2014, and "A1A (Settin' Myself Free)" won Best Country Recording. The latter was also nominated for Best Americana Song at the HMMA Awards (Hollywood Music in Media Awards) in 2014. In 2017, her single "If I Knew" charted on the Hot A/C Music charts.

Arun Shenoy also recorded a jazz version of "If I Knew," released on Narked Records in 2017.

=== Discography ===
- 2006 - Running Home
- 2014 - Love & Loss & Stuff Like That

== Awards ==
Year	Nominated work	Category	Award	Result
2026	"If I Knew" (piano version)	Best Folk Recording	Indie Music Channel Award	Won
2026	"If I Knew" (piano version)	Best Special Video Over $5,000	Indie Music Channel Award	Won
2026	"If I Knew" (piano version)	Best Music Video	Global Music Award	Won
2026	"If I Knew" (piano version)	Best Original Song	London Movie Award	Won
2026	"If I Knew" (piano version)	Best Original Song	Paris Film Award	Won
2026	"If I Knew" (piano version)	Music Video of the Year (female)	Josie Music Award	Nominated
2024	"Fighting with Angels" (acoustic)	Best Americana Song	Indie Music Channel Awards	Nominated
2024		Best Country Song	Clouzine International Music Awards	Won
2021	"Fighting With Angels'"	Best Folk/Acoustic	Hollywood Music in Media Awards	Nominated
2021	"Fighting With Angels"	Best Music Video	Swedish International Film Festival	Won
2018	"If I Knew"	Best Music Video	Bengals International Film Festival	Won
2018	"If I Knew"	Outstanding Achievement Award - Best Music Video	Cult Critic Film Festival	Won
2018	"If I Knew"	Best Folk Song	Clouzine International Music Award	Won
2017	"Lullaby"	Best Female Vocalist and Best Americana Song	Global Music Award	Won
2017	"Summer and Fall Instrumental (ft. Troy Warren)"	Best Instrumental Song	Just Plain Folks Music Award	Nominated
2017	"If I Knew"	Best Adult Contemporary	Hollywood Music in Media Awards	Nominated
