= Steven Halpern =

American new-age musician

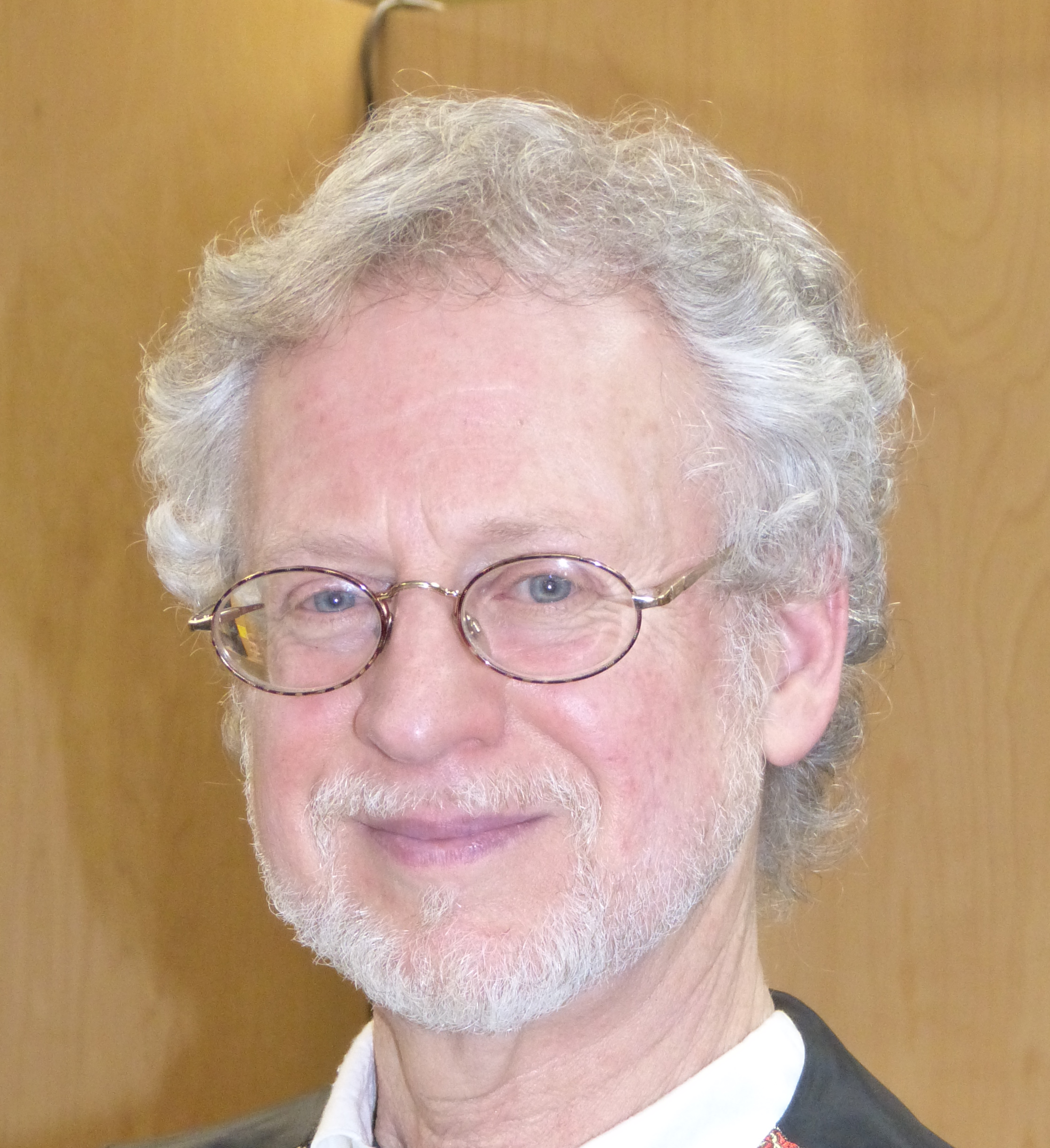
- Steven Halpern in 2012

Background information
- Origin: United States
- Occupation: New-age musician

Steven Halpern is an American new-age musician. He is a Grammy Award nominee and is considered one of the founding fathers of new-age music.

== Early career ==
Halpern played trumpet and guitar in New York early in his career, but moved to California in the late 1960s. There he began exploring the idea of creating music entirely for the purpose of relaxation, which he called "anti-frantic alternative" music. He began creating music that did not adhere to traditional Western tonality, but which instead consisted of static, minimalist pieces for electric piano inspired by Eastern music. He is a proponent of theories which emphasize the healing properties of music. He has been named by MTV as "the original new age artist", beginning his new age performance career in 1969.

His first album was Spectrum Suite, released in 1976 and which is considered to be one of the first true new-age music albums. He began an alternative marketing campaign in order to raise awareness about his music as the genre was not yet widely known. He focused at venues like health food stores, yoga conferences, and alternative retailers. In Billboard Magazine, John Diliberto stated that this album and Halpern's independent marketing techniques "pioneered the market". The inspiration for the album came partly from an experience Halpern had in the California Redwoods, as well as trance or altered states he felt were inspired by his moments there.

== Commercial success ==
In the following ten years, Halpern sold more than one million albums, which he released through his independent label, Halpern Sounds. In 1985, he signed with Gramavision and began releasing music through more mainstream labels. Gramavision also licensed Halpern's prior albums for sale in more traditional retail sectors, as well as alternative ones.

Halpern has recorded more than 50 albums. The most commercially successful of these was 2000's Deja-Blues, which reached #18 on the US Billboard Top New Age Albums chart. Halpern's musical albums have been known to sell at a consistent rate for up to 25 years after their release, and by 1996 he had sold more than two million albums. In addition to being a recording artist, he is known as one of the founders of the new age music philosophy, which created the musical trends within the genre. His aim was to replace more static noise providers like television or radio with sounds that he thought resonated better with the chakras (energy centres in the body, according to yogic philosophies).

He is the author of two books: Tuning the Human Instrument and Sound Health. Halpern has provided readings from his books and lectures in accompaniment to his performances. Halpern was an inaugural member of the Independent Music Awards' judging panel to support independent artists.

== Self-help recordings ==
Halpern has been involved in the recording of self-help audio cassettes since the 1970s. His techniques included the use of self-hypnosis and subliminal persuasion, to try to release the listener's mind more directly from the stress affecting it. Often one side of his recording was meant to be played at night before bed, and the other meant to be played in the background during one's daily activities. Voices inaudible to the regular ear are imbedded in the tape, attempting to suggest positive ideas to the mind. Halpern has also designed recordings that are meant to be played for up to 8 continuous hours, to be used by people experiencing medical distress such as childbirth or surgery.

Halpern's music was specifically utilized in the self-help recordings of John Bradshaw, a public figure in alternative addictions treatment through the 1970s and 1980s. Part of his philosophy is that ambient noise coming from one's surroundings is psychologically and physically damaging. In his book Sound Health: The Music and Sounds that Make us Whole, he wrote that even at home, the combined levels of sound around us can harm the body. In 2014 Halpern appeared in the documentary The Business of Disease, produced by Sonia Barrett. He shared his insights about the healing effect of sound and the negative effects of electrical outlets near our beds while we sleep.

== Awards ==
In 1989 Halpern was awarded the Crystal Award at the first International New Age Music Conference. In 2013 Halpern was nominated for the Grammy Award for Best New Age Album for his album Deep Alpha.

== Discography ==
- 1976 - Spectrum Suite (reissue of Christening For Listening (A Soundtrack for Every Body) (1975)
- 1977 - "I" A Cosmic Attunement a.k.a. Zodiac Suite
- 1978 - Peruvian Whistling Vessels
- 1978 - Ancient Echoes (with Georgia Kelly)
- 1978 - Eastern Peace
- 1978 - Starborn Suite
- 1979 - Hear to Eternity
- 1980 - Comfort Zone
- 1980 - Prelude
- 1981 - Rings of Saturn
- 1981 - Dawn
- 1981 - Eventide
- 1982 - Corridors of Time
- 1983 - Recollections (with Daniel Kobialka)
- 1984 - Connections (with Paul Horn)
- 1984 - Natural Light
- 1984 - Soft Focus
- 1985 - Threshold
- 1987 - Among Friends
- 1988 - Crystal Suite
- 1988 - Radiance
- 1989 - Jonah's Journey (reissue of Shared Visions (1986))
- 1989 - Gaia's Groove
- 1989 - Shifting Focus (reissue of Lifetide (1986))
- 1990 - Islands in Time
- 1991 - Effortless Relaxation
- 1991 - Enhancing Self-Esteem
- 1991 - Radiant Health and Well-Being
- 1991 - Higher Ground
- 1991 - Nurturing Your Inner Child
- 1991 - Radiant Health and Well-Being
- 1993 - Creating Love (reissue of Radiance (1989))
- 1993 - Enhancing Sensual Pleasure
- 1994 - Art of Sexual Ecstasy
- 1994 - Letting Go of Stress
- 1994 - Overcoming Substance Abuse
- 1994 - Recovering from Co-Dependency
- 1994 - Safe Driving
- 1994 - Starting the Day
- 1994 - Enhancing Intimacy (reissue of Enhancing Sensual Pleasure (1993))
- 1994 - Enhancing Massage
- 1994 - Enhancing Success
- 1994 - Inner Peace
- 1994 - Lullabies for Your Inner Child
- 1994 - Lullaby Suite
- 1994 - Self-Healing
- 1994 - Sleep Soundly
- 1994 - Gifts of the Angels
- 1995 - Trance-Zendance: Ambient Entracement
- 1996 - Accelerating Learning
- 1996 - Enhancing Creativity
- 1996 - Music for Your PC
- 1996 - Afro-Desia
- 1996 - In the Key of Healing
- 1996 - Relaxation Spontanee
- 1997 - Attracting Prosperity
- 1997 - Music for Lovers
- 1997 - Stop Smoking
- 1997 - Workstation Wellness
- 1997 - Achieving Your Ideal Weight
- 1998 - The Sacred Chorde, with Fabien Maman on modern monochord
- 1998 - Prophecies
- 1999 - Music for Accelerated Learning
- 1999 - Music for Sound Healing
- 1999 - Serenity Suite:Music & Nature
- 1999 - Divine Intervention
- 1999 - Sound Chi
- 2000 - Deja-Blues
- 2000 - Chants to Awaken the Buddhist Heart
- 2001 - Cruise Control
- 2001 - Chakra Suite
- 2002 - Transitions
- 2002 - Music for Massage
- 2002 - Perfect Alignment
- 2002 - Sound Medicine:Music for Healing
- 2002 - Into the Moment (with Master Charles Cannon a.k.a. M.C. Cannon)
- 2003 - Crystal Bowl Healing
- 2003 - Ocean Suite
- 2004 - Healing Songs of Earth & Sky
- 2005 - Tonal Alchemy
- 2006 - Music for Healing & Unwinding
- 2006 - Lake Suite
- 2006 - Music for Babies
- 2007 - Initiation Inside the Great Pyramid
- 2007 - Music for Lovers, Vol. 2
- 2007 - In the Om Zone
- 2007 - Drum Spirit
- 2007 - Peace of Mind
- 2009 - Relaxation Suite
- 2013 - Deep Alpha
- 2014 - Ambient Alchemy (with Michael Diamond)

== Others ==
- Creativity
- Lifetide
- Peak Performance
- Radiance:Love Songs Without Words
- Recovering from Alcoholism
- Rhythms of Vision
- Shared Vision
- Soundwave 2000 Series
