= Let It Play: Selected Pieces 1979–1983 =

Compilation album by Peter Michael Hamel
- Released: 1987
- Recorded: 1979 – 1983
- Genre: Electronic
- Length: 72:05
- Label: Kuckuck
- Producer: Ulrich Kraus

Peter Michael Hamel chronology
Organum (1986)	Let It Play: Selected Pieces 1979–1983 (1987)	Arrow of Time / The Cycle of Time (1991)

Professional ratings
Review scores
Source	Rating
Allmusic	4.5/5 stars

Let It Play: Selected Pieces 1979–1983 is a compilation by composer Peter Michael Hamel, released in 1987 through Kuckuck Schallplatten. In addition to two unreleased pieces, Let It Play comprises pieces from his albums Colours of Time, Bardo, and Transition.

== Track listing ==
All music is composed by Peter Michael Hamel.

No.	Title	Album	Length
1.	"Mandala" (Opening)	Transition	7:32
2.	"Let It Play" (Part 1)	Transition	7:19
3.	"The Yellow Sound"	previously unreleased	5:26
4.	"Colours of Time" (Part 2)	Colours of Time	18:03
5.	"Bardo"	Bardo	15:25
6.	"Einklang"	previously unreleased	10:04
7.	"Let It Play" (Part 2)	Transition	5:36
8.	"Mandala" (Closing)	Transition	2:40

== Personnel ==
- O. H. Hajek – illustration
- Peter Michael Hamel – piano, keyboards, pipe organ, conch, tingsha
- Wolf Huber – photography
- Ulrich Kraus – keyboards, production, engineering, remastering
- Fernando Lippa – design
