= Celebration (Deuter album) =

Studio album by Deuter
- Released: 1976
- Recorded: München, Germany
- Genres: New age, ambient
- Length: 44:46
- Label: Kuckuck
- Producer: Deuter

Deuter chronology
Aum (1972)	Celebration (1976)	Haleakala (1978)

Professional ratings
Review scores
Source	Rating
Allmusic	3/5 stars

Celebration is the third studio album by new age composer Deuter. It was released in 1976 on Kuckuck Schallplatten.

== Track listing ==
All music is composed by Deuter.

Side one
No.	Title	Length
1.	"Celebration of the Moment"	2:29
2.	"Life Is Love"	7:07
3.	"Vom hohen Himmel ein leuchtendes schweigen"	11:29
4.	"Celebration of the Moment 2"	1:34

Side two
No.	Title	Length
1.	"Grass Grows by Itself"	7:14
2.	"Solitary Bird"	5:06
3.	"Le ciel est bleu"	3:23
4.	"Easy Is Right"	6:24

== Personnel ==
Adapted from the Celebration liner notes.

- Deuter – flute, guitar, synthesizer, musical arrangement, production, photography, design
- Ulrike Leib – photography
- Manfred Manke – design

== Release history ==
Region	Date	Label	Format	Catalog
Germany	1976	Kuckuck	LP	2375 040
Germany	1988	Kuckuck	CD	11040-2
