= Haleakala (album) =

Studio album by Deuter
- Released: 1978
- Genre: New age, ambient
- Length: 37:50
- Label: Kuckuck
- Producer: Deuter

Deuter chronology
Celebration (1976)	Haleakala (1978)	Ecstasy (1979)

Professional ratings
Review scores
Source	Rating
Allmusic	3/5 stars

Haleakala is the fourth studio album by new age composer Deuter. It was released in 1978 on Kuckuck Schallplatten.

== Track listing ==
All music is composed by Deuter.

Side one
No.	Title	Length
1.	"Just for This Moment"	6:32
2.	"Haleakala Mystery"	11:40

Side two
No.	Title	Length
1.	"Crystal Pearls Crystal"	2:12
2.	"Karatas"	7:40
3.	"Mein geliebter berührt mich, umarmt mich der Wind"	9:46

== Personnel ==
Adapted from the Haleakala liner notes.

- Deuter – flute, guitar, synthesizer, production
- Manfred Manke – design
- Eckart Rahn – cover art

== Release history ==
Region	Date	Label	Format	Catalog
Germany	1978	Kuckuck	LP	2375 042
Germany	1997	Kuckuck	CD	11042-2
