= Ecstasy (Deuter album) =

Studio album by Deuter
- Released: 1979
- Genre: New age, ambient
- Length: 44:00
- Label: Kuckuck
- Producer: Deuter

Deuter chronology
Haleakala (1978)	Ecstasy (1979)	Silence Is the Answer (1981)

Professional ratings
Review scores
Source	Rating
Allmusic	4/5 stars

Ecstasy is the fifth studio album by composer Deuter, released in 1979 by Kuckuck Schallplatten.

== Track listing ==
All music is composed by Deuter

Side one
No.	Title	Length
1.	"Wings of Love"	7:17
2.	"Ecstasy"	11:53
3.	"Night Rain"	2:48

Side two
No.	Title	Length
1.	"Blue Waves Gold"	3:32
2.	"Back to a Planet"	6:45
3.	"Brazilian Love"	6:41
4.	"La Ilaha Il Allah"	5:04

== Personnel ==
Adapted from the Haleakala liner notes.

- Deuter – flute, guitar, synthesizer, production
- Eckart Rahn – cover art
- Hermann Wernhard – design

== Release history ==
Region	Date	Label	Format	Catalog
Germany	1979	Kuckuck	CS, LP	MC044
Germany	1997	Kuckuck	CD, CS	11044
