= Arrow of time (disambiguation) =

The arrow of time is a concept concerning the "one-way direction" or "asymmetry" of time.

Arrow of time may also refer to:

- Entropy as an arrow of time
- "Arrow of Time" (Numbers), an episode of Numb3rs
- Arrow of Time/The Cycle of Time, an album by Kuckuck Schallplatten
- "Arrow of Time", a song in the video game Cassette Beasts

== See also ==
- Time's arrow (disambiguation)
