= April Fools' Day =

Annual celebration on 1 April

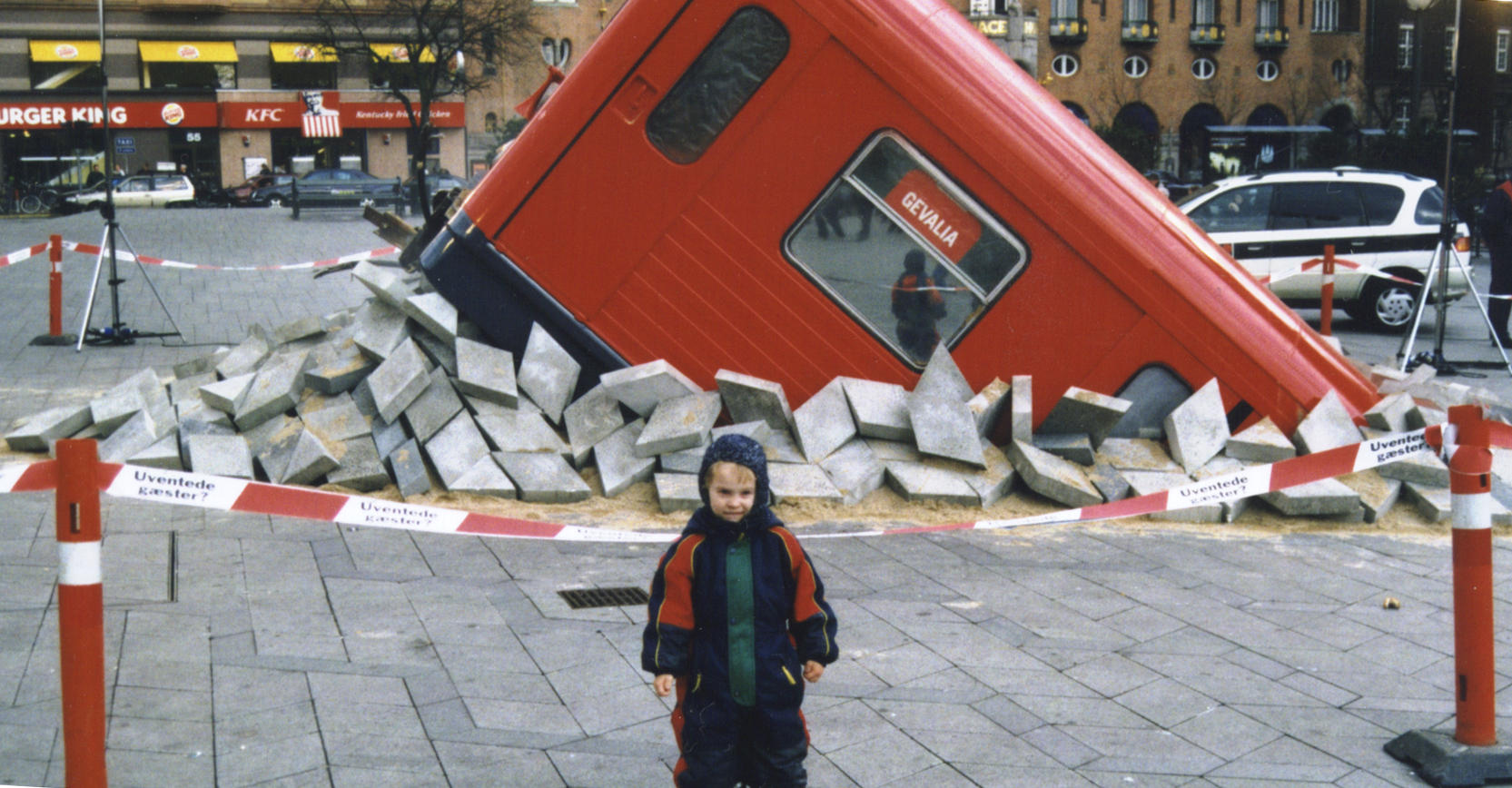
- An April Fools' Day prank marking the construction of the Copenhagen Metro in 2001
- Also called: April Fool's Day
- Type: Cultural, Western
- Significance: Practical jokes, pranks
- Observances: Comical
- Date: 1 April
- Next time: 1 April 2027
- Frequency: Annual

April Fools' Day or April Fool's Day (rarely called All Fools' Day) is an annual custom in many Western countries on 1 April consisting of practical jokes, hoaxes, and pranks. Jokesters often expose their actions by shouting "April Fool[s]!" at the recipient. Mass media can be involved with these pranks, which may be revealed as such the following day. The custom of setting aside a day for playing harmless pranks upon one's neighbor has been relatively common in the world historically.

== Origins ==
Although many theories have been proposed throughout the years, the origin of April Fools' Day is not exactly known.

A disputed association between 1 April and foolishness is in Geoffrey Chaucer's The Canterbury Tales (1392). In the "Nun's Priest's Tale", a vain cock, Chauntecleer, is tricked by a fox "Since March began, full thirty days and two," i.e. the 32nd day from 1 March, which is 1 April. However, it is not clear that Chaucer was referencing 1 April since the text of the "Nun's Priest's Tale" also states that the story takes place on the day when the sun is "in the sign of Taurus had y-rune Twenty degrees and one," which would not be 1 April. Modern scholars believe that there is a copying error in the extant manuscripts and that Chaucer actually wrote, "Syn March was gon". If so, the passage would have originally meant 32 days after March ended, i.e. 2 May.

In 1508, French poet Eloy d'Amerval referred to a poisson d'avril (April fool, literally "April's fish"), possibly the first reference to the celebration in France. Some historians suggest that April Fools' originated because, in the Middle Ages, New Year's Day was celebrated on 25 March in most European towns, with a holiday that in some areas of France, specifically, ended on 1 April, and those who celebrated New Year's Day on 1 January made fun of those who celebrated on other dates by the invention of April Fools' Day. The use of 1 January as New Year's Day became common in France only in the mid-16th century, and that date was not adopted officially until 1564, by the Edict of Roussillon, as called for during the Council of Trent in 1563. However, there are issues with this theory because there is an unambiguous reference to April Fools' Day in a 1561 poem by Flemish poet Eduard de Dene of a nobleman who sent his servant on foolish errands on 1 April, predating the change. April Fools' Day was also an established tradition in Great Britain before 1 January was established as the start of the calendar year.

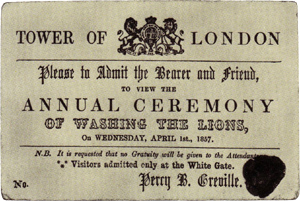
An 1857 ticket to "Washing the Lions" at the Tower of London. No such event ever took place.

In 1686, John Aubrey referred to the celebration as "Fooles holy day", the first British reference. On 1 April 1698, several people were tricked into going to the Tower of London to "see the Lions washed".

Although no biblical scholar or historian is known to have mentioned a relationship, some have expressed the belief that the origins of April Fools' Day may go back to the Genesis flood narrative. In The Complete Compendium of Universal Knowledge of 1895, writer William Ralston Balch wrote:

All Fools' Day is traced through every country of Europe to the Hindoos. The "Public Advertiser" for 13 April 1789, contains the following paragraph:

"Humorous Jewish Origin of the Custom of Making Fools on the First of April.—This is said to have begun from the mistake of Noah in sending the Dove out of the Ark before the water had abated, on the first day of the month among the Hebrews, which answers to the 1st of April; and to perpetuate the memory of this deliverance it was thought proper, who ever forgot so remarkable a circumstance, to punish them by sending them upon some sleeveless errand similar to that ineffectual message upon which the bird was sent by the Patriarch. The custom appears to be of great antiquity, and to have been derived by the Romans from some of the Eastern nations."

— William Ralston Balch (1895)

The Hebrew calendar is lunisolar, and so no specific day always correlates with 1 April in the Julian or Gregorian calendars.

== Long-standing customs ==
=== Armenia ===
In Armenian culture, an April Fool prank is revealed by saying ապրիլ մեկ! (april mek), which means 1 April.

Popular April fools pranks in Armenia include common, harmless tricks like tying a friend or co-worker's shoes together, hiding plastic spiders in drawers of people in their workplace, and switching sugar for salt in hopes of startling an acquaintance as they take a sip of their morning coffee.

Armenian politicians are also known to participate in pranks. In 2013, news site Tert.am was reported to have asked politicians from Armenia to 'lie' for April Fools day.

One tall tale told by a politician was that a Yerevan municipal budget planned to repair all of the city's streets. Of course, this was not actually a planned event, but efforts were being made to restore road infrastructure in Yerevan around that time period.

A spokesperson from the Prosperous Armenia party also recalled being the butt end of an April Fools joke. A false news report was made saying that he had recently been married and fathered a child, which led to the spokesperson being congratulated for almost a full year before Armenian citizens came to the realization that the spokesperson was a victim of a prank and that none of the information passed around about him was even relatively true.

The Armenian Weekly is an online newspaper based in Massachusetts. It was founded in 1934 and has been making news reports ever since, though print editions ceased production in 2025. The site tells about happenings in Armenia and is also responsible for an April Fools prank, which stated that an alligator had escaped from a local reptile show and was currently inhabiting a pond in Watertown, Massachusetts. This prank had little to nothing to do with the people in the country of Armenia, but Watertown is home to many Armenian citizens who were almost all in on the joke.

=== Germany ===
In Germany, an April Fool prank consists of tricking someone else to believe a fake story, usually to be later revealed by shouting "April, April!" at the recipient.

=== Iran ===
In Iran, dorugh-e Sizdah (lie of Thirteen) is celebrated as part of Sizdah Be-dar. It is similar to April Fools' Day, and celebrated on the 13th of Farvardin in the Persian calendar, which usually falls around 1 or 2 April. Pranks have reportedly been played on this holiday since 536 BC, making it perhaps the oldest known joke day.

=== Ireland ===
In Ireland, it was traditional to entrust the victim with an "important letter" to be given to a named person. That person would read the letter, then ask the victim to take it to someone else, and so on. The letter when opened contained the words "send the fool further".

=== Italy, France, Belgium, and French-speaking areas ===
In Italy, France, Belgium and French-speaking areas of Switzerland and Canada, the 1 April tradition is often known as "April fish" (poisson d'avril in French, aprilvis in Dutch or pesce d'aprile in Italian). Possible pranks include attempting to attach a paper fish to the victim's back without being noticed. This fish feature is prominently present on many late 19th- to early 20th-century French April Fools' Day postcards. Many newspapers also spread a false story on April Fish Day, and a subtle reference to a fish is sometimes given as a clue to the fact that it is an April Fools' prank. Bakeries, pâtisseries and chocolatiers in France sell chocolate fishes in their shop windows on the day.

=== Lebanon ===
In Lebanon, an April Fool prank is revealed by saying كذبة أول نيسان (which translates to "First of April Lie") to the recipient.

=== Nordic countries ===
Danes, Finns, Icelanders, Norwegians and Swedes celebrate April Fools' Day (aprilsnar in Danish; aprillipäivä in Finnish; aprilsnarr in Norwegian; aprilskämt in Swedish). Most news media outlets will publish exactly one false story on 1 April; for newspapers this will typically be a first-page article but not the top headline. In Sweden, April Fools' jokes are revealed with the phrase, "April, April, din dumma sill, jag kan lura dig vart jag vill!" This can be translated to, "April, April, you silly herring, I can trick you wherever I want!" They can also be revealed with the phrase 'Maj maj måne, jag kan lura dig till Skåne!' (May, may moon, I can trick you into Scania!). The tradition of April Fools' Day dates back to the 17th century. There were also April Fools' letters, with one of the earliest known examples dating back to 1742. This letter discussed an earlier church service.

=== Poland (prima Aprilis) ===
In Poland, prima Aprilis ("the 1st of April" in Latin) as a day of pranks is a centuries-long tradition. It is a day when many pranks are played: sometimes very sophisticated hoaxes are prepared by people, media (which often cooperate to make the "information" more credible), and even public institutions. Serious activities are usually avoided; every word said on the 1st of April could be untrue. The conviction for this is so strong that the Polish anti-Turkish alliance with Leopold I, signed on 1 April 1683, was backdated to 31 March. However, for some in Poland, prima Aprilis ends at noon of 1 April and prima Aprilis jokes after that hour are considered inappropriate and not classy.

=== Spanish-speaking countries ===
In many Spanish-speaking countries (and the Philippines), "Día de los Santos Inocentes" (Holy Innocents Day) is a festivity that is very similar to April Fools' Day, but is celebrated in late December (27, 28 or 29 December depending on the location). Despite this, in Galicia April Fools' Day is also traditional, as accounted by Ramón Otero Pedrayo, as "Día dos enganos", and the tradition is embedded in a traditional saying about this day being the day when donkeys go where they must not go.

=== Turkey ===
Turkey also has a custom of April Fools' pranks. Pranks and jokes are usually verbal and are revealed by shouting "Bir Nisan! / Nisan Bir!" (1 April!).

=== Ukraine ===
April Fools' Day is widely celebrated in Odesa and has the special local name Humorina (in Ukrainian Гуморина, Humorina). This holiday arose in 1973. An April Fool prank is revealed by saying "Перше квітня — брехня всесвітня" ("Pershe kvitnya — brekhnya vsesvitnya", translating as "First of April — worldwide lies") to the recipient. The festival includes a large parade in the city centre, free concerts, street fairs and performances. Festival participants dress up in a variety of costumes and walk around the city fooling around and pranking passersby. One of the traditions on April Fools' Day is to dress up the main city monument in funny clothes. Humorina even has its own logo—a cheerful sailor in a lifebelt—whose author was the artist Arkady Tsykun. During the festival, special souvenirs bearing the logo are printed and sold. Since 2010, April Fools' Day celebrations include an International Clown Festival, and both celebrated as one. In 2019, the festival was dedicated to the 100th anniversary of the Odesa Film Studio and all events were held with an emphasis on cinema.

=== United Kingdom ===
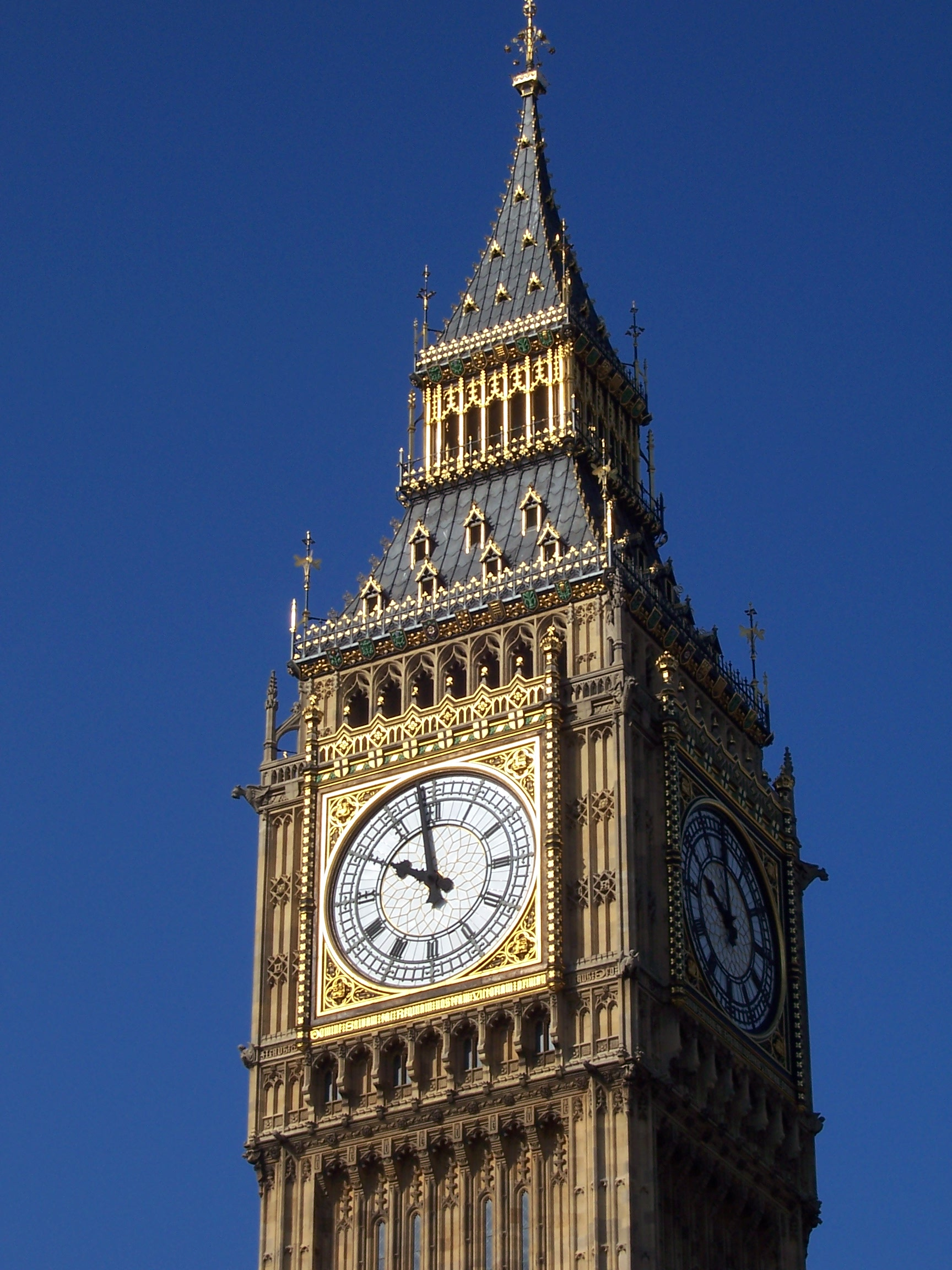
On April Fools' Day 1980, the BBC announced Big Ben's clock face was going digital and whoever got in touch first could win the clock hands.

In the UK, an April Fool prank is sometimes later revealed by shouting "April fool!" at the recipient, who becomes the "April fool". A study in the 1950s, by folklorists Iona and Peter Opie, found that in the UK, and in countries whose traditions derived from the UK, this continues to be the practice, with the custom ceasing at noon, after which time it is no longer acceptable to play pranks; a person playing a prank after midday is considered the "April fool" themself.

In Scotland, April Fools' Day was originally called "Huntigowk Day". The name is a corruption of "hunt the gowk", gowk being Scots for a cuckoo or a foolish person; alternative terms in Gaelic would be Là na Gocaireachd, "gowking day", or Là Ruith na Cuthaige, "the day of running the cuckoo". The traditional prank is to ask someone to deliver a sealed message that supposedly requests help of some sort. In fact, the message reads "Dinna laugh, dinna smile. Hunt the gowk another mile." The recipient, upon reading it, will explain they can only help if they first contact another person, and they send the victim to this next person with an identical message, with the same result. The following day was known as "preen-tail day", or "tailie day"; the tradition involved attaching paper tails to people's backs, often with an unflattering message.

In England a "fool" is known by a few different names around the country, including "noodle", "gob", "gobby", or "noddy".

=== United States ===
Since 1986, New York City has hosted the Annual April Fools' Day Parade, founded by artist and activist Joey Skaggs. The parade features satirical floats and performances that lampoon political figures, celebrities, and current events. Participants often dress in costumes and carry props to embody the year's most notable "fools". The event begins at Fifth Avenue and 59th Street and proceeds to Washington Square Park, where a "King (or Queen) of Fools" is crowned. The parade has become a platform for public commentary and satire, drawing attention to societal issues through humour and performance art.

== Pranks ==
Elaborate pranks have appeared on radio and television stations, newspapers, and websites, and have been performed by large corporations. In one famous prank in 1957, the BBC broadcast a film in their Panorama current affairs series purporting to show Swiss farmers picking freshly-grown spaghetti, in what they called the Swiss spaghetti harvest. The BBC was soon flooded with requests to purchase a spaghetti plant, forcing them to declare the film a hoax on the news the next day.

With the advent of the Internet and readily available global news services, April Fools' pranks are now viewed globally, practiced on social media platforms such as YouTube.

== Comparable prank days ==
=== 28 December ===
28 December, the equivalent day in Spain and Hispanic America, is also the Christian day of celebration of the Day of the Holy Innocents. The Christian celebration is a religious holiday in its own right, but the tradition of pranks is not, though the latter is observed yearly. In some regions of Hispanic America, after a prank is played, the cry is made, "Inocente palomita que te dejaste engañar" ("You innocent little dove that let yourself be fooled!"; not to be confused with another meaning of palomita, which means "popcorn" in some dialects).

In Argentina, the prankster says, "¡Que la inocencia te valga!" which roughly translates as advice to not be as gullible as the victim of the prank. In Spain, it is common to say just "¡Inocente!" (which in Spanish can mean "innocent" or "gullible").

In Colombia, the phrase used is "Pásala por Inocentes", which means: "Let it go, today is the Day of the Innocent."

In Belgium, this day is also known as the "Day of the Innocent Children" or "Day of the Stupid Children". It used to be a day where parents, grandparents, and teachers would fool the children in some way. But the celebration of this day has died out in favour of April Fools' Day.

Nevertheless, on the Spanish island of Menorca, Dia d'enganyar ("Fooling day") is celebrated on 1 April because Menorca was a British possession during part of the 18th century. In Brazil, the "Dia da mentira" ("Day of the lie") is also celebrated on 1 April due to Portuguese influence.

=== First day of a new month ===
In many English-speaking countries, mainly Britain, Ireland, Australia, New Zealand and South Africa, it is a custom to say "pinch and a punch for the first of the month" or an alternative, typically by children. The victim might respond with "a flick and a kick for being so quick", and the attacker might reply with "a punch in the eye for being so sly".

Another custom in Britain and North America is to say "rabbit rabbit" upon waking on the first day of a month, for good luck.

Similar events include Poisson d'avril (France) and in the US the International day of the joke event which is celebrated in the 1st of July.

== Reception ==
The practice of April Fool pranks and hoaxes is controversial. The mixed opinions of critics are epitomised in the reception to the 1957 BBC "spaghetti-tree hoax", in reference to which newspapers were split over whether it was "a great joke or a terrible hoax on the public".

April Fools' can be good for one's health because it encourages "jokes, hoaxes ... pranks, [and] belly laughs", and brings all the benefits of laughter. Many "best of" April Fools' Day lists showcase the best examples of how the day is celebrated. Various April Fools' campaigns have been praised for their innovation, creativity, writing, and general effort.

Negative views describe April Fools' hoaxes as "creepy and manipulative", "rude" and "a little bit nasty", as well as based on Schadenfreude and deceit. When genuine news or a genuinely important order or warning is issued on April Fools' Day, there is risk that it will be misinterpreted as a joke and ignored – for example, when Google, known to play elaborate April Fools' Day hoaxes, announced the launch of Gmail with 1-gigabyte inboxes in 2004, an era when competing webmail services offered 4-megabytes or less, many dismissed it as a joke outright. On the other hand, sometimes stories intended as jokes are taken seriously.

Either way, there can be adverse effects, such as confusion, misinformation, waste of resources (especially when the hoax concerns people in danger) and even legal or commercial consequences.

In March 2020, during the COVID-19 pandemic, various organizations and people warned not to observe April Fools' Day, as a mark of respect due to the large amount of tragic deaths that COVID-19 had caused up to that point, the wish to provide truthful information to counter any misinformation about the virus, and to pre-empt any attempts to incorporate the virus into potential pranks. For example, Google decided not to do its traditional April Fools' jokes that year. Because the pandemic was still ongoing a year later in 2021, Google also decided not to do pranks that year.

In Thailand, the police warned ahead of April Fools' in 2021 that posting or sharing fake news online could lead to maximum of five years imprisonment.

Other examples of genuine news on 1 April mistaken as a hoax include:

- 1 April 1946: Warnings about the Aleutian Island earthquake's tsunami that killed 165 people in Hawaii and Alaska.
- 1 April 1984: News that the singer Marvin Gaye was shot and killed the day before his 45th birthday by his father Marvin Gay Sr. on 1 April 1984. Several people close to Gaye such as fellow singers Smokey Robinson and Jermaine Jackson, brother of Michael Jackson didn't believe the news initially and had to call other people who knew Gaye to confirm the news, Al Sharpton during his interview for the VH1 documentary VH1's Most Shocking Moments in Rock & Roll referenced the coincidence of the date when he said that Gaye's death came "like a sick, sad joke to all of us."
- 1 April 1995: News that the singer Selena was shot and killed by the former president of her fan club Yolanda Saldívar on 31 March 1995. When radio station KEDA broke the news on 31 March 1995, many people accused the staff of lying because the next day was April Fools' Day.
- 1 April 2001: The Netherlands becoming the first country in the world to recognize same-sex marriage.
- 1 April 2003：News that the singer and actor Leslie Cheung committed suicide that day.
- 1 April 2005: News that the comedian Mitch Hedberg had died on 29 March 2005.
- 1 April 2005: Announcement about Powerpuff Girls Z, by Aniplex, Cartoon Network and Toei Animation. The TV show was an anime adaptation of the cartoon The Powerpuff Girls and the idea that a cartoon would get turned into an anime was considered very outlandish in 2005 as this was the first time it happened.
- 1 April 2009: Announcement that the long running soap opera Guiding Light was being cancelled. The date was so heavily associated with jokes and pranks that even some of the cast and crew members did not believe the news when it was announced by CBS, the TV network that aired the show.
- 1 April 2011: Isaiah Thomas declared for the NBA draft. Basketball players in the NBA are usually taller than average as height gives advantage to playing basketball, and Thomas is comparatively short.
- 1 April 2025: the National Football League announced that records and statistics from the All-America Football Conference would be recognized in its official records.
- 1 April 2026, President of the United States Donald J. Trump said, in an interview with a British newspaper, that he was threatening to pull the United States out of NATO.

== In popular culture ==
Books, films, telemovies and television episodes have used April Fools' Day as their title or inspiration.

Examples include Bryce Courtenay's novel April Fool's Day (1993), whose title refers to the day Courtenay's son died. The 1990s sitcom Roseanne featured an episode titled "April Fools' Day". This turned out to be intentionally misleading, as the episode was instead about Tax Day in the United States, occurring on 15 April. The 19th episode of the first season of SpongeBob SquarePants, "Fools In April", also centres around a plot that takes place on April Fools' Day. Video game developer Mojang Studios have released April Fool's Day updates for Minecraft: Java Edition over the years.

The 1986 film, April Fool's Day, is a slasher movie set on April Fool's Day, with a 2008 direct-to-video remake.

== See also ==
- Feast of Fools, a similar medieval festival
- List of April Fools' Day jokes
- List of practical joke topics

== Bibliography ==
- Patoski, Joe Nick (1996). Selena: Como La Flor. Boston: Little Brown and Company. ISBN 978-0-316-69378-3.
- Ritz, David (1991). Divided Soul: The Life of Marvin Gaye. Cambridge, Massachusetts: Da Capo Press. ISBN 0-306-81191-X.
