= Colours of Time =

Colours of Time may refer to:

- Colours of Time (film), 2025 film directed by Cédric Klapisch
- Colours of Time (album), 1980 album by Peter Michael Hamel
