= Compendium =

Compilation of a body of knowledge

A compendium (pl. compendia or compendiums) is a comprehensive collection of information and analysis pertaining to a body of knowledge. A compendium may concisely summarize a larger work. In most cases, the body of knowledge will concern a specific field of human interest or endeavor (e.g. hydrogeology, logology, ichthyology, phytosociology or myrmecology), while a general encyclopedia can be referred to as a "compendium of all human knowledge". The word compendium arrives from the Latin word compeneri, meaning "to weigh together or balance". The 21st century has seen the rise of democratized, online compendia in various fields.

== Etymology ==
The Latin prefix con- is used in compound words to suggest, "a being or bringing together of many objects" and also suggests striving for completeness with perfection. And compenso means "to balance, poise, weigh, offset."

== Definitions ==
The entry on the word compendious in the Online Etymology Dictionary says "concise, abridged but comprehensive", "concise compilation comprising the general principles or leading points of a longer 'system or work'". Its etymology comes from a Medieval Latin use (com + pendere), literally meaning to weigh together.

== Examples ==
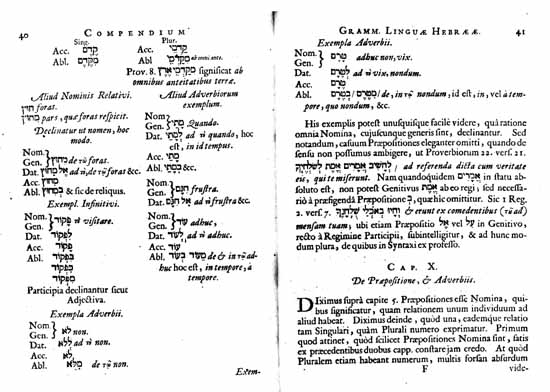
Benedictus de Spinoza: Compendium Grammaticus Lingua Hebraeae, 1677, pages 40-41.

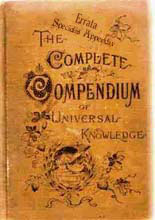
The Complete Compendium of Universal Knowledge (1895)

A field guide is a compendium of species found within a geographic area, or within a taxon of natural occurrence such as animals, plants, rocks and minerals, or stars. Bestiaries were medieval compendiums that catalogued animals and facts about natural history, and were particularly popular in England and France around the 12th century.

A cookbook is a compendium of recipes within a given food culture.

An example would be the Catechism of the Catholic Church, a concise 598-question-and-answer book which summarises the teachings of the Catholic Church.

Some well-known literary figures have written their own compendium. An example would be Alexandre Dumas, author of The Three Musketeers, and a gourmand. His compendium on food titled From Absinthe to Zest serves as an alphabet for food lovers.

== See also ==
- Anthology
- Edited volume
- Monograph
- Owners manual
- Treatise
