= Organum (album) =

Studio album by Peter Michael Hamel
- Released: 1986
- Genre: Electronic
- Length: 57:02
- Label: Kuckuck
- Producer: Ulrich Kraus

Peter Michael Hamel chronology
Transition (1981)	Organum (1986)	Let It Play: Selected Pieces 1979-1983 (1987)

Professional ratings
Review scores
Source	Rating
Allmusic	3/5 stars

Organum is the ninth album of electronic composer Peter Michael Hamel, released in 1986 through Kuckuck Schallplatten.

== Track listing ==
All music is composed by Peter Michael Hamel

No.	Title	Length
1.	"Part 1"	25:32
2.	"Part 2"	8:34
3.	"Part 3"	17:16
4.	"Part 4"	5:40

== Personnel ==
- Peter Michael Hamel – pipe organ, conch, tingsha
- Athanasius Kircher – illustration
- Ulrich Kraus – production, engineering
- Oda Sternberg – photography
- Irmgard Voigt – design
