= Louis Gerstman =

American neuropsychologist (1930–1992)

Louis "Lou" Gerstman (April 22, 1930 – March 17, 1992) was an American neuropsychologist best known for his work in speech synthesis. He was a co-inventor, along with John Kelly, of the computer portrayed as HAL 9000 in the film 2001: A Space Odyssey. He also worked with Irv Teibel on Teibel's psychoacoustic environments recording series at Bell Labs, where Gerstman was working at the time.

== Early life ==
On April 22, 1930, Gerstman was born in Buffalo, New York.

== Education ==
Gerstman attended the University of Buffalo, Harvard University, and New York University.

== Career ==
In 1950s and early 1960s, Gerstman was a researcher and consultant for Western Electric, Bell Labs, Haskins Laboratories, and Columbia University during which he worked on computer speech processing to aide stroke recovery and learning disabilities. In 1966, he began teaching at City University in New York City and he became a professor at City College in 1969. At the latter, he specialized in speech processes and disorders and oversaw doctoral programs in experimental cognition.

Gerstman was also an expert in "voiceprint" spectrograms and testified as an expert witness in the 1973 bribery trial of New Orleans District Attorney Jim Garrison. In 1961, he helped create the first computer program for speech synthesis while working with IBM. The program was intended to be used in Kubrick's 2001, but the two parties eventually parted ways and the film crew employed an actor to read the lines.

== Personal life ==
In March 1992, Gerstman died of lung cancer. Gerstman was 61.

== Discography ==
- Music From Mathematics (Bell Telephone Laboratories, Inc., 1960)
- Synthesized Speech (Bell Telephone Laboratories, Inc., 1962)
