= D (Deuter album) =

Studio album by Deuter
- Released: 1971
- Genres: Krautrock; ambient; new age
- Length: 40:24
- Label: Kuckuck
- Producer: Deuter

Deuter chronology
D (1971)	Aum (1972)

Professional ratings
Review scores
Source	Rating
Allmusic	4/5 stars

D is the debut studio album of composer Deuter, released in 1971 by Kuckuck Schallplatten.

== Track listing ==
All music is composed by Deuter.

Side one
No.	Title	Length
1.	"Babylon" (I. Andantino/II. Allegro 138A/III. Andante/IV. Allegro 138B)	14:55
2.	"Der Turm/Fluchtpunkt"	4:28

Side two
No.	Title	Length
1.	"Krishna Eating Fish and Chips"	10:00
2.	"Atlantis"	6:03
3.	"Gammastrahlen-Lamm"	4:58

== Personnel ==
Adapted from the D liner notes.

- Deuter – flute, guitar, synthesizer, production, engineering
- Achim Elsner – mastering
- Sigrid Müller-Gunow – photography, art direction

== Release history ==
Region	Date	Label	Format	Catalog
Germany	1971	Kuckuck	CS, LP	MC 017
Germany	1998	Kuckuck	CD	11009
Germany	2009	Missing Vinyl	LP	MV022
United Kingdom	2010	Esoteric	CD	EREACD1008
