= Silence Is the Answer =

Studio album by Deuter
- Released: 1981
- Recorded: 1980 – 81 in Poona, India
- Genre: New-age
- Length: 85:41
- Label: Kuckuck
- Producer: Deuter

Deuter chronology
Ecstasy (1979)	Silence Is the Answer (1981)	Cicada (1982)

Professional ratings
Review scores
Source	Rating
Allmusic	4.5/5 stars

Silence Is the Answer is an album by composer Deuter, released in 1981 on Kuckuck Schallplatten.

== Track listing ==
All music is composed by Deuter.

Side one
No.	Title	Length
1.	"Silence Is the Answer: Part I"	5:51
2.	"Silence Is the Answer: Part II"	11:57
3.	"Silence Is the Answer: Part III"	6:13

Side two
No.	Title	Length
1.	"Silence Is the Answer: Part IV"	12:34
2.	"Silence Is the Answer: Part V"	1:04
3.	"Silence Is the Answer: Part VI"	5:44

Side three
No.	Title	Length
1.	"Gratitude"	3:19
2.	"Call of the Unknown"	4:56
3.	"My Best Friend Is a Buddha"	5:16
4.	"Aus der Stille"	1:48
5.	"As Far as the Ear Can Listen"	4:26
6.	"Song of the Heart"	2:07

Side four
No.	Title	Length
1.	"Dawn"	3:38
2.	"Loving a Buddha: Part I"	2:08
3.	"Loving a Buddha: Part II"	4:06
4.	"Divine Dust"	5:38
5.	"I Take Rest"	3:47
6.	"Ananda Nada"	1:09

== Personnel ==
- Deuter – flute, guitar, recorder, synthesizer, production
- Carol Mersereau – photography
- Eckart Rahn – photography
- Hermann Wernhard – design
- Klaus Wiese – tamboura
