= Inside (Paul Horn album) =

Live album by Paul Horn
- Released: 1969
- Recorded: April 25, 1968
- Venue: Taj Mahal, Agra, India
- Genre: New age; world fusion
- Length: 34:03
- Label: Epic Records (BXN 26466)
- Producer: Paul Horn

Paul Horn chronology
Paul Horn in Kashmir – Cosmic Consciousness (1969)	Inside (1969)	Paul Horn and the Concert Ensemble (1970)

Inside is a live album by American flautist and composer Paul Horn, released in 1969 by Epic Records. It was recorded inside the Taj Mahal in Agra, India on April 25, 1968, during Horn's visit to produce a documentary about Maharishi Mahesh Yogi and Transcendental Meditation. It features Horn playing solo flute with an unidentified guard of the tombs who provides Hindu chants. The album marks a major stylistic departure for Horn who achieved initial notoriety as a jazz musician, both solo and with his group, the Paul Horn Quintet.

Inside became a commercial success, selling over one million copies worldwide and became one of the earliest examples of world fusion and New-age music. In the 1980s, the album was reissued with new artwork as Inside the Taj Mahal. In 1989, to commemorate the album's twentieth anniversary, Horn returned to the Taj Mahal and recorded a sequel, Inside the Taj Mahal II.

== Background ==
Horn began his professional music career in the 1950s as a jazz flautist and saxophonist and released albums under his own name and his own group, the Paul Horn Quintet. Horn learned to play the flute at age 19, later than he had picked up other instruments. Towards the end of the 1960s, it became the primary instrument that Horn wanted to play. In 1967, Horn decided to pursue a "spiritual pilgrimage" and became one of the celebrity musicians to accompany The Beatles on their visit to India in February 1968 to complete a Transcendental Meditation course with Maharishi Mahesh Yogi at his ashram in Rishikesh. The trip included a visit to New Delhi where Horn recorded tracks for Paul Horn in Kashmir – Cosmic Consciousness and Paul Horn in India – Ragas for Flute, Veena, and Violin, two albums that marked a major stylistic departure from Horn's jazz origins.

Horn's trip included a visit to the Taj Mahal in Agra. There, he encountered a guard "informally standing on duty" to protect the tombs. Horn wrote: "Quite unexpectedly he bursts forth a vocal 'call' every few minutes to demonstrate the remarkable acoustics emanating from the solid marble dome", which produced a 28-second unbroken echo. The sound captured Horn's interest and quickly had the "very faint hope that I might have a chance to play even one note in that remarkable chamber." Horn maintained that it was never his intention to record or make an album inside the Taj Mahal, "it just happened". His original idea was to produce a tape of his flute playing inside the building and play it for himself and some friends.

== Production ==
=== Recording ===
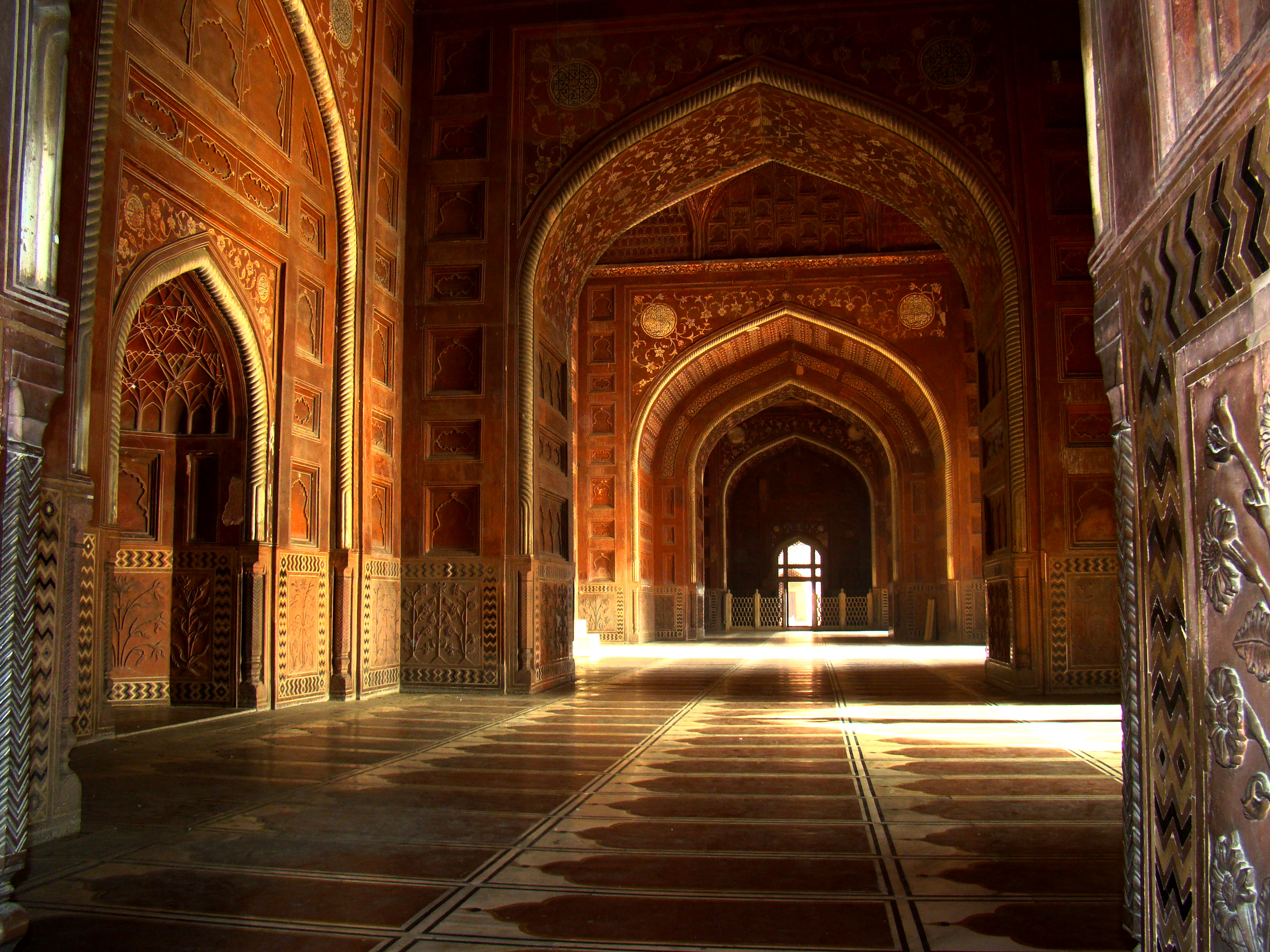
Interior of the Taj Mahal

Shortly after his return to the U.S., Horn became the producer of a documentary film on the Maharishi and Transcendental Meditation which saw him return to India in April 1968. On April 25, during a stop in Agra, he returned to the Taj Mahal assisted by a 14-year-old boy named Sankar, who Horn paid to translate and carry out odd jobs for the crew. Inside, the tomb guard granted Horn permission to return at 8:30 p.m. that evening, one hour before closing time, so he could play the flute when it was less busy. Horn arrived that evening with Sankar, audio engineer John Archer, and photographer Earl Barton. Horn approached the tomb guard, but realised it was not the same one he had previously met. Archer, not knowing this, proceeded to set up the recording equipment which included a microphone and a Nagra portable tape recorder. Initially, the guard told Horn not to play. Horn recalled: "'But you sing in here, don't you?' I said. 'I sing to God,' he answered very emphatically. 'Well I play my flute to God,' I said, just as emphatically, and to take [the flute] out of the case and put it together."

With his alto flute assembled Horn blew a low C note, which "filled the entire room and hung there" as the guard "stood there transfixed". He signalled Archer to start recording and for several minutes, played what ever came to his mind. Upon stopping, Horn found the guard smiling and signalled him to give one of his Hindi calls. At closing time the guard left to do one of his rounds of the building, but allowed Horn and the crew to stay. The opening track, "Prologue/Inside", features the guard's chants. Horn soon found his arms covered with mosquitoes, but he continued to play. Upon reviewing the recordings at his hotel room, he heard a mosquito fly by the microphone during one of his improvisations. It can be heard around 42 seconds in on "Agra". A fireworks display as part of a wedding celebration can be heard in the background of "Mumtaz Mahal". At around 11:00 p.m., all of the recording tape had been used and Horn left.

=== Signing with Epic ===
Horn did not consider to release a commercial album with his recordings until he had returned to Los Angeles and played the tape to his friends, who encouraged him to contact record labels and pitch it. The first contact was his friend Richard Bock, the founder of Pacific Jazz Records, who forwarded the album to the marketing man, Massey Lipton. The album was not picked up; Lipton considered its concept too difficult to gain enough radio airplay and suggested the addition of percussion instruments, which Horn refused to do. Bock sided with Lipton, and Horn ended his search for a label. Roughly a year later Horn reunited with his friend Chuck Gregory, by now a director of the A&R team for Epic Records, and played the album to him. Gregory was immediately enthusiastic, and got head A&R man David Kapralik in New York City involved, who also liked the album and secured Horn a record deal with Epic. Gregory asked Horn how much his advance for the album was to be. Horn asked for, and received, $5,000. Horn also received a "big break" on the publishing deal, receiving one hundred per cent of the share. He later noted that he had earned more money from his full share of the publishing rights than from royalties generated from album sales.

=== Packaging ===
Horn wished to detail the album's conception in the liner notes, but he could not fit the text on one inner surface. His request for the album to be packaged in a gatefold sleeve, which allowed two inner surfaces, initially caused problems, as the Epic's policy only granted gatefold sleeves for double albums which were sold for $4.99 instead of $3.99 for a standard record. Horn persisted, and avoided the business affairs department in favor of resolving the issue with the head of the label, who granted his request. Initially, Horn wanted a photograph of the Taj Mahal on the front cover, but "freaked out" when he saw what Epic had decided upon: a close up of his face from the top of his eyes to his chin. Horn expressed greater satisfaction with the design for the album's 1980s reissue by Kuckuck/Celestial Harmonies.

== Reception ==
Inside earned positive reviews upon release in mid-1969. Bruce Temple for The Courier-Journal considered the Taj Mahal to be "one of the most intriguing recording studios in the world" because of the album. In a review published in the Pensacola News Journal, Cliff Smith wrote: "To hear this LP is to know why Horn was compelled to play in this acoustical wonderland. I've never heard such a sound in my life", and praised its "intrigue and beauty". Gene Lees of High Fidelity called the music "serene" in a recording that "has an incredible ambience, an otherworldly beauty that communicates itself with gentle insistence." In a retrospective review for AllMusic, Jim Brenholts gave the album four-and-a-half stars out of five. He hailed it "a classic in the new age community" and a "masterpiece" with Horn's "marvelous melodies and deep improvs are matchless, seamless, and timeless".

In 2001, the BBC reported that the album had sold over one million copies.

== Track listing ==
All music by Paul Horn.

Side one
No.	Title	Length
1.	"Prologue/Inside"	3:57
2.	"Mantra I/Meditation"	2:20
3.	"Mumtaz Mahal"	3:23
4.	"Unity"	4:32
5.	"Agra"	1:38

Side two
No.	Title	Length
1.	"Vibrations"	1:41
2.	"Akasha"	2:52
3.	"Jumna"	2:42
4.	"Shah Jahan"	5:40
5.	"Mantra II/Duality"	2:24
6.	"Ustad Isa/Mantra III"	2:27

== Personnel ==
Credits taken from the album's liner notes.

Music

- Paul Horn – flute
- Unidentified tomb guard – chanting

Production

- Paul Horn – production, liner notes
- John Archer – recording engineer
- Kip Kipnis – liner notes
- Earl Barton – photographs
- Larry Kurland – photographs

== Sources ==
- Horn, Paul; Underwood, Lee (1990). Inside Paul Horn: The Spiritual Odyssey of a Universal Traveler. Harper. ISBN 978-0-062-50388-6.
