= Arrow of Time / The Cycle of Time =

Studio album by Peter Michael Hamel
- Released: June 3, 1991
- Recorded: May 1991 at the Moyes Hall of the Slovak Philharmonic in Bratislava, Slovakia
- Genre: Electronic
- Length: 57:02
- Label: Kuckuck
- Producers: Karol Kopernicky, Eckart Rahn

Peter Michael Hamel chronology
Let It Play: Selected Pieces 1979-1983 (1987)	Arrow of Time / The Cycle of Time (1991)	Violinkonzert Diaphainon Gralbilder (1993)

Professional ratings
Review scores
Source	Rating
Allmusic	3/5 stars

Arrow of Time / The Cycle of Time is the tenth album of composer Peter Michael Hamel, released in 1991 through Kuckuck Schallplatten.

== Track listing ==
All music is composed by Peter Michael Hamel.

No.	Title	Length
1.	"The Arrow of Time: I. Andante"	13:53
2.	"The Arrow of Time: II. Agitato"	3:55
3.	"The Arrow of Time: III. Scherzo"	6:17
4.	"The Arrow of Time: IV. Andante"	6:25
5.	"The Arrow of Time: V. Allegro"	3:07
6.	"The Cycle of Time: I. Allegretto"	9:53
7.	"The Cycle of Time: II. Largo"	6:24
8.	"The Cycle of Time: III. Andante"	12:02
9.	"The Cycle of Time: IV. Vivace"	6:10

== Personnel ==
- Cappella Istropolitana – instruments
- Hubert Geschwandtner – engineering
- Peter Michael Hamel – composer
- Benno Hess – illustration
- Karol Kopernicky – production
- Ulrich Kraus – mastering
- Jaroslav Krček – conductor
- Wolf Huber – photography
- Fernando Lippa – illustration
- Mario Markus – illustration
- Eckart Rahn – production
- Daniela Ruso – harpsichord
