= Falkenhagen Bunker =

Abandoned bunker in Brandenburg, Germany

Coordinates: 52°25′48.58″N 14°21′19.63″E

The Falkenhagen Bunker is an abandoned semi-submerged and bunker-level military industrial complex, just north of the town of Falkenhagen in the district Märkisch-Oderland, in Brandenburg, Germany.

It was originally designed by Nazi Germany for the production of N-stoff (chlorine trifluoride); it never reached its potential before being overrun by the Soviet Army in 1945. The site was eventually reconstructed by the Warsaw Pact to become its main command and control bunker outside the Soviet Union.

== Nazi Germany: 1938–1945 ==
Under the code name N-stoff ("substance N"), chlorine trifluoride was investigated for military applications by the Kaiser Wilhelm Institute in Nazi Germany from slightly before the start of World War II. Tests were made against mock-ups of the Maginot Line fortifications, and it was found to be an effective incendiary and poison gas weapon combined.

From 1938 construction commenced on a partly bunkered, partly subterranean 14,000 m² munitions factory at Falkenhagen, which was intended to produce 50 tonnes of N-stoff per month, plus Sarin. However, by the time it was captured by the advancing Red Army in 1945, the factory had produced only about 30 to 50 tonnes, at a cost of over 100 German Reichsmarks per kilogram^{a}. N-stoff was never used during the war.

== Soviet Army: 1945–1993 ==
After the end of World War II, and with the Soviets aware of the US Army's nuclear and chemical capability, the fate of the Falkenhagen complex was secured as a research facility. Little is known of what exact research was undertaken, but the complex was operational as a Soviet Army facility throughout the 1950s.

In 1965, the Warsaw Pact countries established a main command post at Falkenhagen. The bunkers were extended and refurbished, and complex communications technology was installed, creating a state-of-the-art nuclear and chemical warfare-proof underground bunker with supporting facilities. From intelligence created by the Western Allies, the complex was seen as the main bunker of the Warsaw Pact outside the Soviet Union. Developed over the years, the once sparse industrial complex gained a Soviet military village, containing a theatre, shops, a school, housing and medical facilities.

== Abandonment: 1993–present ==
When East and West Germany were reunified in 1989–90, the Soviets agreed to hand back their bases to the German authorities by 1994. They spent the next three years stripping the Falkenhagen Bunker of all signs of military occupation, leaving only the hardened concrete subterranean structures when they left the complex in 1993.
