= Aum (album) =

Studio album by Deuter
- Released: 1972
- Genre: Krautrock
- Length: 43:31
- Label: Kuckuck
- Producer: Deuter

Deuter chronology
D (1971)	Aum (1972)	Celebration (1976)

Professional ratings
Review scores
Source	Rating
Allmusic	2/5 stars

Aum is the second studio album by krautrock composer Deuter. It was released in 1972 on Kuckuck Schallplatten.

== Track listing ==
All music is composed by Deuter.

Side one
No.	Title	Length
1.	"Phoenix/Aum/Soham"	9:45
2.	"Offener Himmel I/Gleichzeitig/Offener Himmel II/Sattwa/Morning Glory"	12:03

Side two
No.	Title	Length
1.	"Soma/Surat Shabda/Abraxas/Susani/The Key"	21:43

== Personnel ==
Adapted from the Aum liner notes.

- Deuter – flute, guitar, synthesizer, musical arrangement, production
- Manfred Manke – photography, art direction

== Release history ==
Region	Date	Label	Format	Catalog
Germany	1972	Kuckuck	LP	2375 017
Germany	1998	Kuckuck	CD	11017-2
United Kingdom	2010	Esoteric	CD	EREACD1009
United Kingdom	2010	Cherry Red	LP	CRP113
