= Bardo (album) =

Studio album by Peter Michael Hamel
- Released: 1981
- Genre: Electronic
- Length: 48:05
- Label: Kuckuck
- Producer: Ulrich Kraus

Peter Michael Hamel chronology
Colours of Time (1980)	Bardo (1981)	Transition (1983)

Professional ratings
Review scores
Source	Rating
Allmusic	3/5 stars

Bardo is the seventh album of composer Peter Michael Hamel, released in 1981 through Kuckuck Schallplatten.

== Track listing ==
All music is composed by Peter Michael Hamel.

Side one
No.	Title	Length
1.	"Dorian Dervishes"	21:47

Side two
No.	Title	Length
1.	"Bardo"	26:18

== Personnel ==
- Peter Michael Hamel – pipe organ, electronic organ, synthesizer
- Ulrich Kraus – synthesizer, production, engineering
