= Transition (Peter Michael Hamel album) =

Studio album by Peter Michael Hamel
- Released: 1983
- Genre: Electronic
- Length: 86:50
- Label: Kuckuck
- Producer: Ulrich Kraus

Peter Michael Hamel chronology
Bardo (1981)	Transition (1983)	Organum (1986)

Professional ratings
Review scores
Source	Rating
Allmusic	5/5 stars

Transition is the eighth album of composer Peter Michael Hamel, released in 1983 through Kuckuck Schallplatten.

== Track listing ==
All music is composed by Peter Michael Hamel

Side one
No.	Title	Length
1.	"Transition"	17:17

Side two
No.	Title	Length
1.	"Mandala"	25:15

Side three
No.	Title	Length
1.	"Let It Play"	13:06
2.	"Transpersonal"	9:38

Side four
No.	Title	Length
1.	"Apotheosis"	21:34

== Personnel ==
- Peter Michael Hamel – piano, pipe organ, PPG Wave, synthesizer
- Wolf Huber – photography
- Ulrich Kraus – production, engineering
- Hermann Wernhard – design
