= Nada (Peter Michael Hamel album) =

Studio album by Peter Michael Hamel
- Released: 1977
- Genre: Electronic
- Length: 40:15
- Label: WERGO
- Producer: Ulrich Kraus

Peter Michael Hamel chronology
Buddhist Meditation East-West (1975)	Nada (1977)	Colours of Time (1980)

Professional ratings
Review scores
Source	Rating
Allmusic	2/5 stars

Nada is the fifth album of composer Peter Michael Hamel, released in 1977 through WERGO.

== Track listing ==
All music is composed by Peter Michael Hamel.

Side one
No.	Title	Length
1.	"Nada"	6:20
2.	"Silence"	5:15
3.	"Slow Motion"	5:00

Side two
No.	Title	Length
1.	"Beyond the Wall of Sleep"	23:40

== Personnel ==
- Anatol Arkus – synthesizer on "Nada"
- Werner Bethsold – photography
- Peter Michael Hamel – piano, electronic organ, synthesizer
- Ulrich Kraus – production, engineering, synthesizer on "Nada"
- Heinz-Jürgen Kropp – design
