= William Ralston Balch =

American writer (1852–1923)

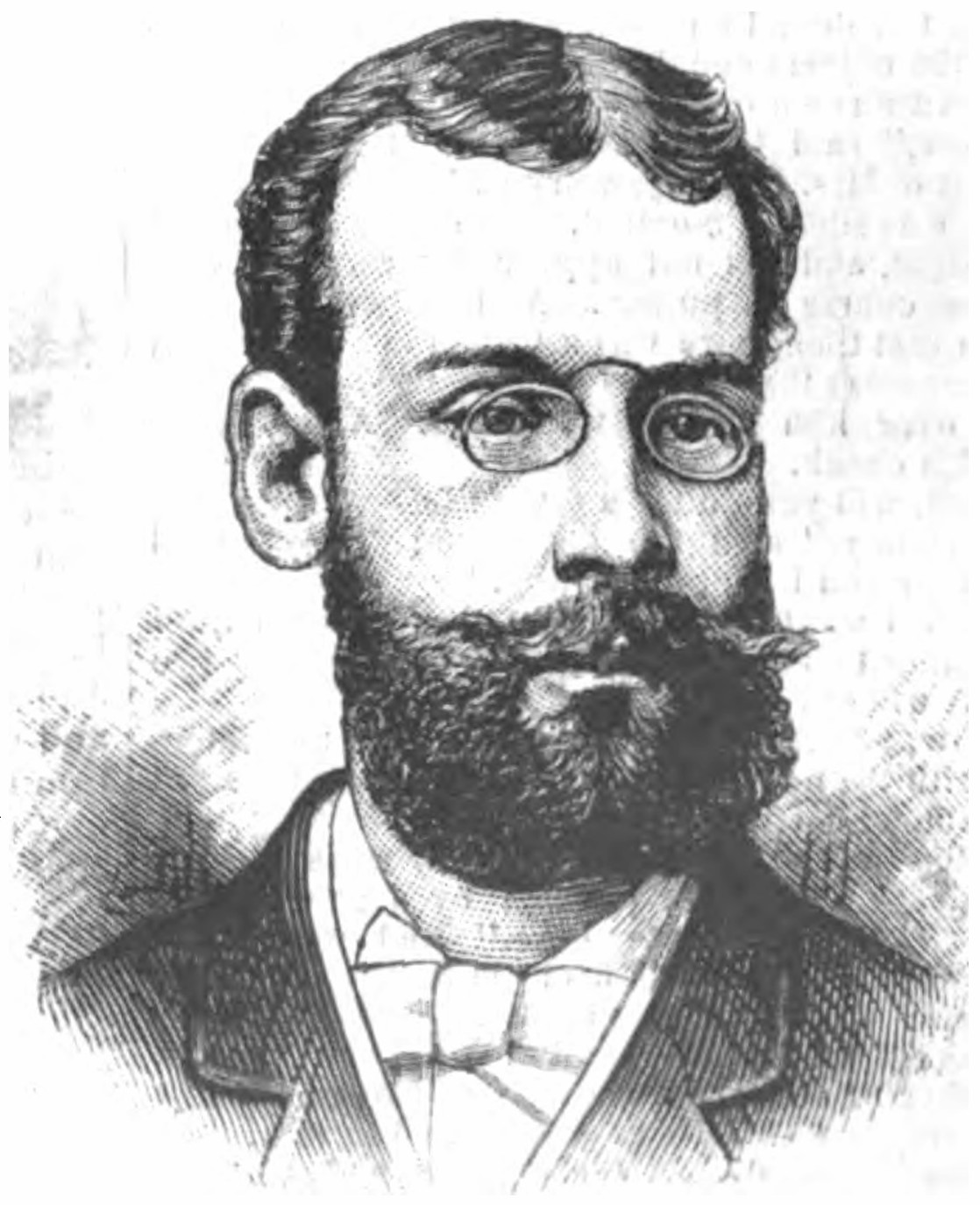
- Portrait in Frank Leslie's Illustrated Newspaper, 1879
- Born: December 9, 1852; Leetown, Virginia, United States
- Died: March 7, 1923 (aged 70); Somerville, Massachusetts, United States
- Notable work: The Complete Compendium of Universal Knowledge

William Ralston Balch (pseudonym C. C. C.; December 9, 1852 – March 7, 1923) was an American journalist and author who wrote The Complete Compendium of Universal Knowledge, among other reference works. A supplemented edition of James Sanks Brisbin's biography of James A. Garfield, published in 1881, was credited wholly to him.

== Biography ==
Born on December 9, 1852 in Leetown, Virginia, he began his newspaper work in the composing room of the Concord Monitor as a boy in 1871. He was connected with the London Bureau of the Associated Press for several years. Balch was responsible for the raising of the $500,000 fund of the London Daily Mail during the Boer War. In this work he secured the co-operation of Rudyard Kipling, whose poem, "The Absent-minded Beggar," which he wrote especially for this cause, brought so much money into the office of the Mail that it was decided to found a veterans' hospital at Portsmouth, England.

Balch contributed to the London Daily Mail an exclusive account of the impending death of Queen Victoria, developed out of a noblewoman's remark to her dressmaker that black would be the fashion that winter. In Boston he tracked down the suspected murderer Chastine Cox, who had long baffled the New York police. In 1879, he was managing editor of The Philadelphia Press, and later was connected with the Boston Daily Advertiser and Boston Herald.

When Balch served as a founding editor of The American in 1880, the magazine featured notable contributors like Henry Cuyler Bunner, Hjalmar Hjorth Boyesen, Paul Hamilton Hayne, and Walt Whitman. In 1884, he wrote a biography of Republican presidential candidate James G. Blaine. Balch was the author of the War Chronicle in the columns of the Boston Evening Transcript during World War I. He died on March 7, 1923 in Somerville Massachusetts.

== Personal ==
Balch was the son of Rev. Dr. Lewis Penn Witherspoon Balch Jr. (1814–1875) and his second wife Emily Wiggin Balch (1826–1891). Thomas Balch was one of his uncles.

On June 21, 1881, Balch married Elizabeth Singerly. They had one daughter.

== Bibliography ==
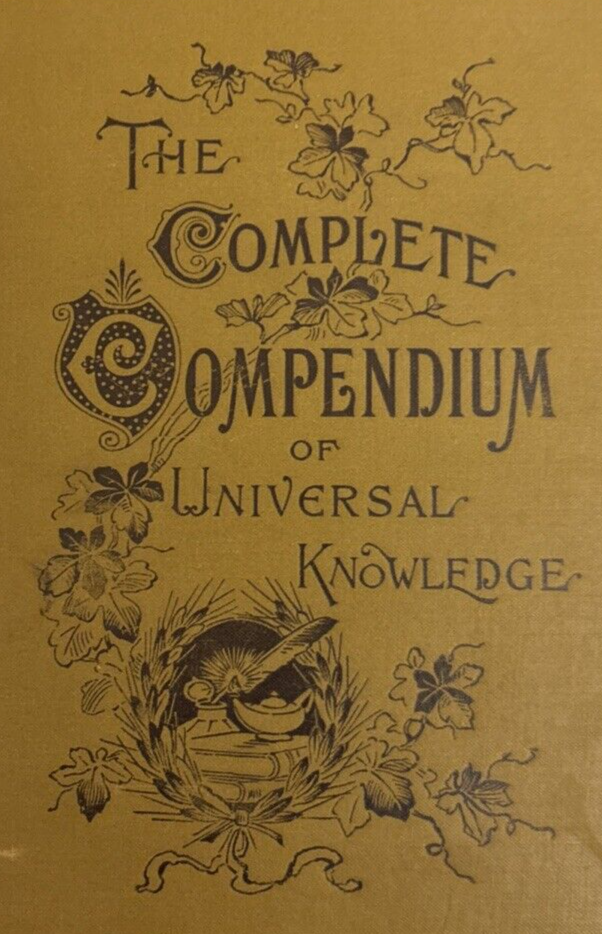
Front cover of The Complete Compendium of Universal Knowledge, 1891

Balch's encyclopedia titled "The Complete Compendium of Universal Knowledge" was published in 1891. His biography of American president James A. Garfield was published in 1881, although it was only a republished edition of James Sanks Brisbin's biography of Garfield, to which Balch had presumably added chapters. Balch wrote other encyclopedias around the same time, including The People's Dictionary and Every-day Encyclopedia in 1883 and Ready Reference: The Universal Cyclopaedia Containing Everything that Everybody Wants to Know in 1901.

- Garfield, James Abram (1881). Balch, William Ralston (ed.). Garfield's Words: Suggestive Passages from the Public and Private Writings of James Abram Garfield. Houghton, Mifflin.
- Balch, William Ralston (1881). Life of James Abram Garfield: Late President of the United States. J.C. McCurdy & Company.
- Balch, William Ralston, ed. (1882). Mines, Miners and Mining Interests of the United States in 1882. Mining industrial publishing house.
- Balch, William Ralston (1883). A Message from the Sea: Cape May to Atlantic City: A Summer Note Book. Philadelphia: Press of Allen, Lane & Scott.
- Balch, William Ralston, ed. (1883). The People's Dictionary and Every-day Encyclopedia: Comprising All the Information Needed Upon Any Subject in Daily Use : a Hand-book for Everybody for Each Day in the Year. Thayer, Merriam.
- Balch, William Ralston (1884). An American Career and Its Triumph: The Life and Public Services of James G. Blaine, with the Facts in the Career of John A. Logan. Philadelphia: Thayer, Merriam & Company, Limited.
- Balch, William Ralston (1885). The Battle of Gettysburg: An Historical Account. Philadelphia: Press of McLaughlin Bros. Co.
- Balch, William Ralston (1891). The Complete Compendium of Universal Knowledge: Containing All You Want to Know of Language, History, Government, Business and Social Forms, and a Thousand and One Other Useful Subjects. Franklin Square Bible House.
- Balch, William Ralston, ed. (1902). Ready Reference: The Universal Cyclopaedia Containing Everything that Everybody Wants to Know. Griffith Farran Browne & Company.
