= Colours of Time (album) =

Studio album by Peter Michael Hamel
- Released: 1980
- Recorded: December 1979 in Munich, Germany
- Genre: Electronic
- Length: 40:10
- Label: Kuckuck

Peter Michael Hamel chronology
Nada (1977)	Colours of Time (1980)	Bardo (1981)

Professional ratings
Review scores
Source	Rating
Allmusic	3/5 stars

Colours of Time is the sixth album of composer Peter Michael Hamel, released in 1980 through Kuckuck Schallplatten.

== Track listing ==
All music is composed by Peter Michael Hamel.

Side one
No.	Title	Length
1.	"Colours of Time (Part 1)"	22:05

Side two
No.	Title	Length
1.	"Colours of Time (Part 2)"	18:05

== Personnel ==
- Peter Michael Hamel – electronic organ, synthesizer
- Ulrich Kraus – electric organ, synthesizer, engineering
