= Falkenhagen =

- Municipality
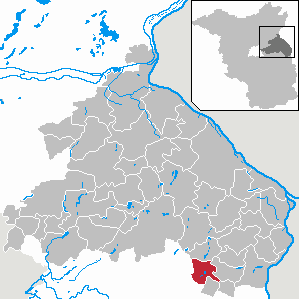
- Location of Falkenhagen within Märkisch-Oderland district
- Interactive map of Falkenhagen
- Location within Germany Location within Brandenburg
- Coordinates: 52°25′59″N 14°19′00″E
- Country: Germany
- State: Brandenburg
- District: Märkisch-Oderland
- Municipal assoc.: Seelow-Land
- Subdivisions: 3 Ortsteile

Government
  - Mayor (2024–29): Bärbel Mede (SPD)

Area
  - Total: 27.18 km^{2} (10.49 sq mi)
- Elevation: 61 m (200 ft)

Population (2025-12-31)
  - Total: 669
  - Density: 24.6/km^{2} (63.7/sq mi)
- Time zone: UTC+01:00 (CET)
  - Summer (DST): UTC+02:00 (CEST)
- Postal codes: 15306
- Dialling codes: 033603
- Vehicle registration: MOL

Falkenhagen is a municipality in the district Märkisch-Oderland, in Brandenburg, Germany.

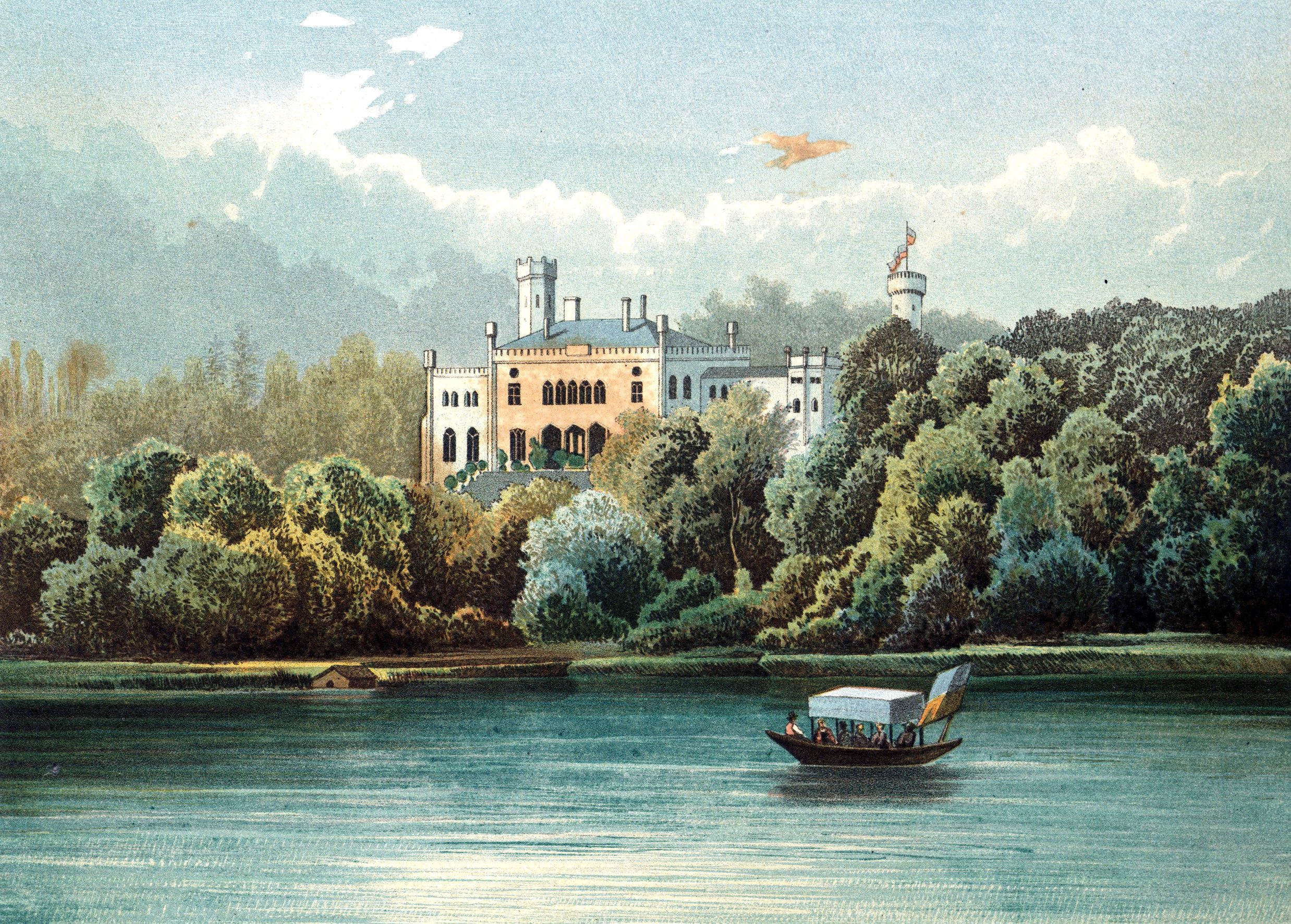
Palace Falkenhagen around 1860, Edition by Alexander Duncker

== Demography ==
Development of population since 1875 within the current boundaries (Blue line: Population; Dotted line: Comparison to population development of Brandenburg state; Grey background: Time of Nazi rule; Red background: Time of communist rule)

Falkenhagen (Mark): Population development
within the current boundaries (2013)

Year	Pop.	±% p.a.
1875	964	—
1890	780	−1.40%
1910	851	+0.44%
1925	938	+0.65%
1933	799	−1.98%
1939	752	−1.01%
1946	1,076	+5.25%
1950	1,238	+3.57%
1964	1,152	−0.51%
1971	1,110	−0.53%
1981	990	−1.14%
1985	967	−0.59%
1989	917	−1.32%
1990	930	+1.42%
1991	877	−5.70%
1992	868	−1.03%
1993	861	−0.81%
1994	878	+1.97%
1995	881	+0.34%
1996	787	−10.67%

Year	Pop.	±% p.a.
1997	777	−1.27%
1998	777	+0.00%
1999	786	+1.16%
2000	781	−0.64%
2001	761	−2.56%
2002	750	−1.45%
2003	746	−0.53%
2004	754	+1.07%
2005	768	+1.86%
2006	794	+3.39%
2007	788	−0.76%
2008	765	−2.92%
2009	767	+0.26%
2010	752	−1.96%
2011	729	−3.06%
2012	717	−1.65%
2013	719	+0.28%
2014	718	−0.14%
2015	711	−0.97%
2016	697	−1.97%

== See also ==
- Falkenhagen Bunker
