= New-age music =

Genre of music

New-age
- Stylistic origins: Electronic; ambient; folk; rock; world; classical; krautrock; kosmische musik; easy listening; minimal; progressive rock
- Cultural origins: 1960s and early 1970s, Europe and United States
- Derivative forms: Post-noise

Subgenres
- Space music; biomusic; progressive electronic; nu-new age

Fusion genres
- Celtic fusion

Other topics
- New Age; meditation; environmentalism; List of new-age music artists; neo-kosmische; progressive music; frippertronics

New age is a genre of music intended to create artistic inspiration, relaxation, and optimism. It is used by listeners for yoga, massage, meditation, and reading as a method of stress management to bring about a state of ecstasy rather than trance, or to create a peaceful atmosphere in homes or other environments. It is sometimes associated with environmentalism and New Age spirituality; however, most of its artists have nothing to do with "New Age spirituality", and some even reject the term.

New-age music includes both acoustic forms, featuring instruments such as flutes, piano, acoustic guitar, non-Western acoustic instruments, while also engaging with electronic forms, frequently relying on sustained synth pads or long sequencer-based runs. New-age artists often combine these approaches to create electroacoustic music. Vocal arrangements were initially rare in the genre, but as it has evolved, vocals have become more common, especially those featuring Native American-, Sanskrit-, or Tibetan-influenced chants, or lyrics based on mythology such as Celtic legends.

There is no exact definition of new-age music. However, it is often judged by its intent according to the Grammy screening committee in that category. An article in Billboard magazine in 1987 commented that "New Age music may be the most startling successful non-defined music ever to hit the public consciousness". Many consider it to be an umbrella term for marketing rather than a musical category, and to be part of a complex cultural trend.

New-age music was influenced by a wide range of artists from a variety of genres. Tony Scott's Music for Zen Meditation (1964) is considered the first new-age recording. Paul Horn (beginning with 1968's Inside) was one of the important predecessors. Irv Teibel's Environments series (1969–1979) featured natural soundscapes, tintinnabulation, and "Om" chants and were some of the first publicly available psychoacoustic recordings. Steven Halpern's 1975 Spectrum Suite was a key work that began the new-age music movement.

== Definition ==
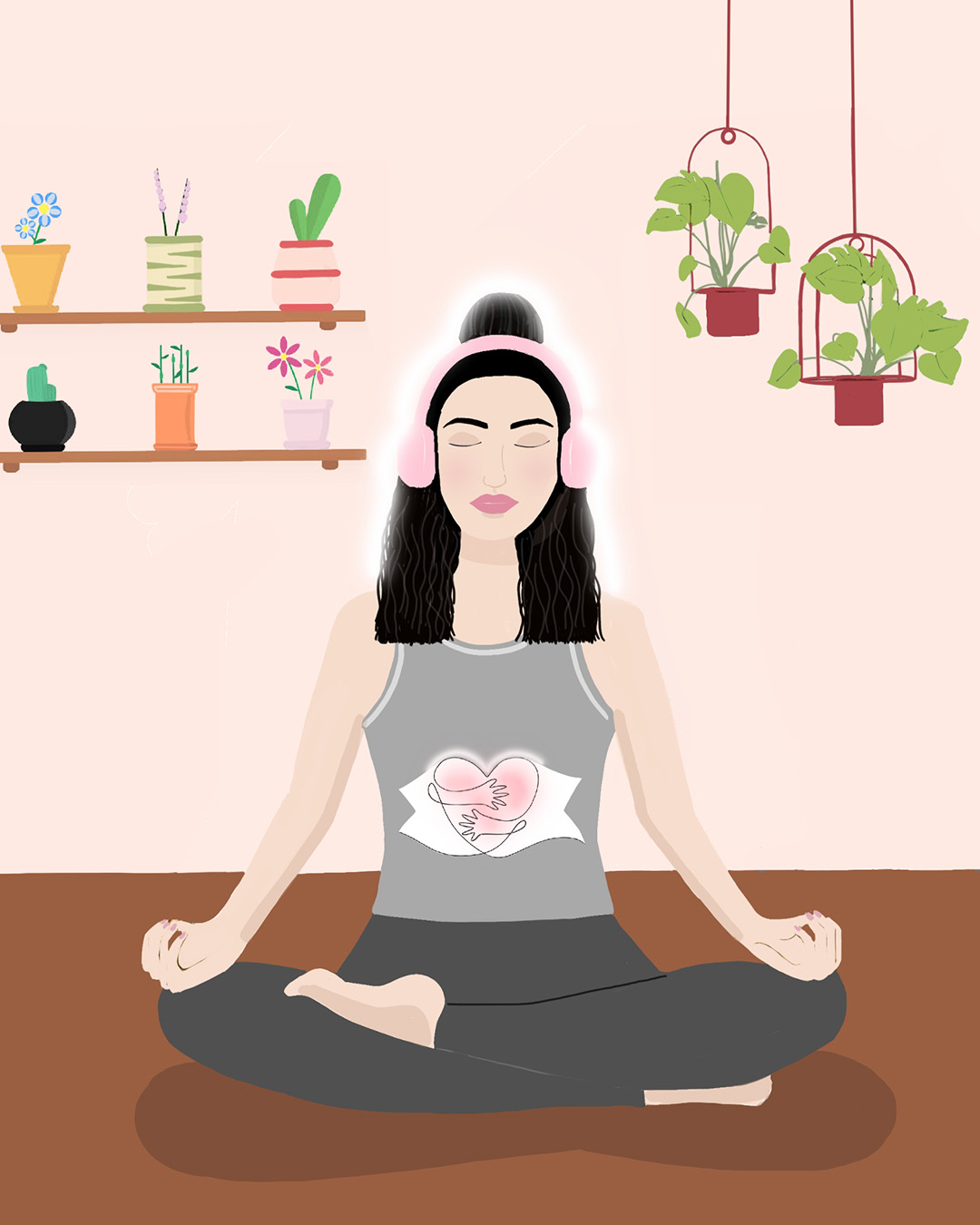
New-age music can be therapeutic for stress reduction, mindfulness and meditation.

New-age music is defined more by the use and effect or feeling it produces rather than the instruments and genre used in its creation; it may be acoustic, electronic, or a mixture of both. New-age artists range from solo or ensemble performances using classical-music instruments ranging from the piano, acoustic guitar, flute, or harp to electronic musical instruments, or from Eastern instruments such as the sitar, tabla and tamboura. There is also a significant overlap of sectors of new-age music with ambient, classical, jazz, electronica, world, chillout, pop, and space music, among others.

The two definitions typically associated with the new-age genre are:

- New-age music with an ambient sound that has the explicit purpose of aiding meditation and relaxation, or aiding and enabling various alternative spiritual practices, such as alternative healing, yoga practice, guided meditation, or chakra auditing. The proponents of this definition are almost always musicians who create their music expressly for these purposes. To be useful for meditation, music must have repetitive dynamic and texture without sudden loud chords or improvisation, which could disturb the meditator. It is minimalist in conception, and musicians in the genre are mostly instrumentalists rather than vocalists. Subliminal messages are also used in new-age music, and the use of instruments along with sounds of animals (like whales, wolves and eagles) and nature (waterfalls, ocean waves, rain) is also popular. Flautist Dean Evenson was one of the first musicians to combine peaceful music with the sounds of nature, launching a genre that became popular for massage and yoga. Other prominent artists who create new-age music expressly for healing or meditation include Irv Teibel, Paul Horn, Deuter, Steven Halpern, Paul Winter, Lawrence Ball, Karunesh, Krishna Das, Deva Premal, Bhagavan Das, and Snatam Kaur.
- Music found in the new-age sections of record stores. This is largely a definition of practicality, given the breadth of music classified as "new age" by retailers that are often less interested in finely grained distinctions between musical styles than are fans of those styles. Music that falls into this definition usually cannot be easily classified into other, more common definitions, but can contain almost any kind of music; it is more of a marketing slogan rather than musical category.

=== Debate and criticism ===
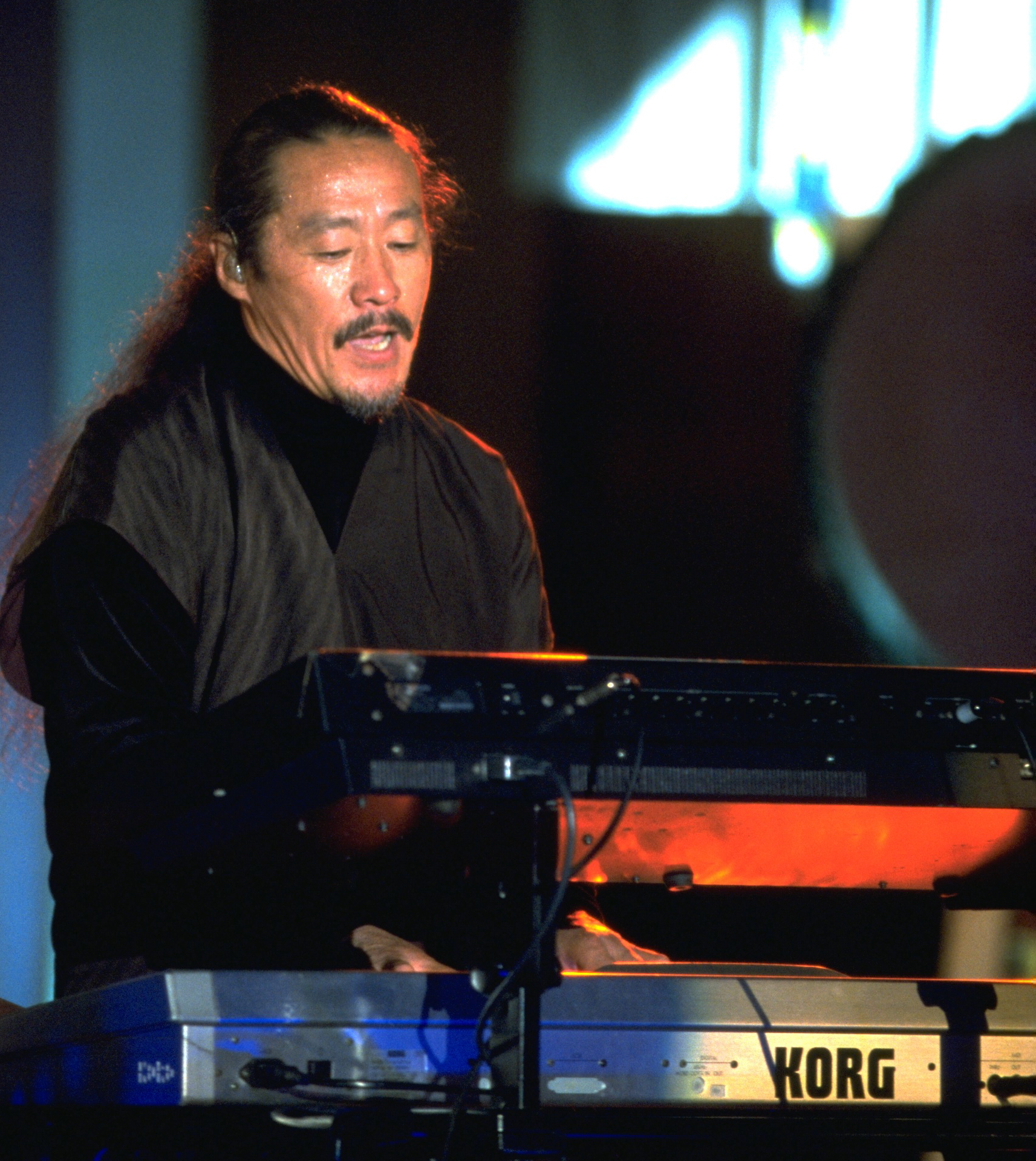
Kitarō, a prominent new-age music artist from Japan

Stephen Hill, founder of Hearts of Space, considers that "many of the artists are very sincerely and fully committed to New Age ideas and ways of life". Some composers like Kitarō consider their music to be part of their spiritual growth, as well as expressing values and shaping the culture. Douglas Groothuis stated that from a Christian perspective, rejection of all music labeled as "new age" would be to fall prey to a taboo mentality, as most of the music belongs to the "progressive" side of new-age music, where composers necessarily do not always have a New Age worldview.

However, it is often noted that "new-age music" is a mere popular designation that successfully sells records. J. Gordon Melton argued that it does not refer to a specific genre of music, but to music used for therapeutic or other new-age purposes. Kay Gardner considered the label "new age" an inauthentic commercial intention of so-called new-age music, saying, "a lot of new age music is schlock", and how due to record sales, everyone with a home studio put in sounds of crickets, oceans or rivers as a guarantee of sales. What started as ambient mood music related with new-age activity became a term for a musical conglomeration of jazz, folk, rock, ethnic, classical, and electronica, among other styles, with the former, markedly different musical and theoretical movement.

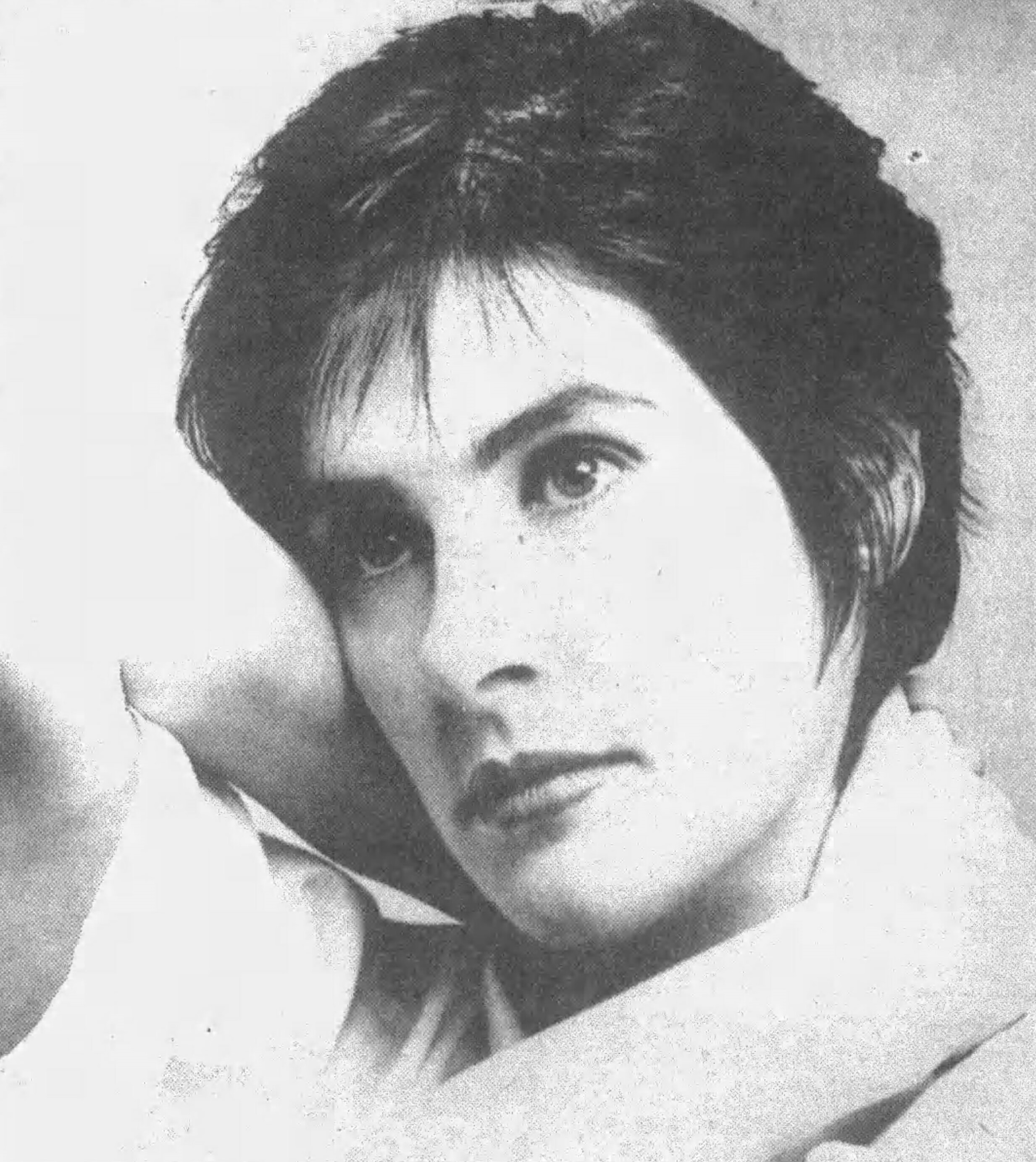
Enya is credited with bringing new-age to the mainstream in America with her worldwide hit, "Orinoco Flow"

Under the umbrella term, some consider Mike Oldfield's 1973 progressive rock album Tubular Bells one of the first albums to be referred to under the genre description of new-age. Others consider music by Greek composer Vangelis and general modern jazz-rock fusion as exemplifing the progressive side of new-age music. Other artists included are Jean-Michel Jarre (even though his electronic excursions predate the term), Andreas Vollenweider, George Winston, Mark Isham, Michael Hedges, Shadowfax, Mannheim Steamroller, Kitarō, Yanni, Enya, Clannad, Era, Tangerine Dream and Enigma.

However, many musicians and composers dismiss the labeling of their music as "new age". When the Grammy Award for Best New Age Album was first created in 1987, its first winner, Andreas Vollenweider, said, "I don't have any intention to label my music... It's ridiculous to give a name to anything that is timeless". Peter Bryant, music director of WHYY-FM and host of a new-age program, noted that "I don't care for the term... New-age has a negative connotation... In the circles I come in contact with, people working in music, 'new-age' is almost an insult", that it refers to "very vapid, dreamy kinds of dull music... with no substance or form or interest", and that the term has "stuck".

"It has been called "aural wallpaper," "music for the Birkenstock crowd" and "yuppie elevator music." Its titles evoke a holistic, hot-tubbing world: Etosha — Private Music in the Land of Dry Water, Aerial Boundaries, Nirvana Road. Although its composers include musicians prominent in the rock avant-garde, it is marked by a meditative aesthetic whose goal is often creative anonymity. A laid-back synthesis of folk, jazz and classical influences, it is called, by rough convention, New Age music." – Michael Walsh, writing for Time (1986)

Harold Budd said, "When I hear the term 'new-age' I reach for my revolver... I don't think of myself as making music that is only supposed to be in the background. It's embarrassing to inadvertently be associated with something that you know in your guts is vacuous." Vangelis considers it to be a style that "gave the opportunity for untalented people to make very boring music". Yanni stated that "I don't want to relax the audience; I want to engage them in the music, get them interested", and that "New age implies a more subdued, more relaxed music than what I do. My music can be very rhythmic, very energetic, even very ethnic." David Van Tieghem, George Winston and Kitarō also rejected the label of new-age artist. David Lanz said that he "finally figured out that the main reason people don't like the term new age is because it's the only musical category that isn't a musical term". Andreas Vollenweider noted that "we have sold millions of records worldwide before the category new age was actually a category", and shared the concern that "the stores are having this problem with categorization".

"New age is a spiritual definition more than a musical definition. Some musicians began by associating themselves with new-age music. Now they've thrown everybody in there. But it would be silly to associate with this particular music". – Yanni on new-age music definition (1992)

Ron Goldstein, president of Private Music, agreed with such a standpoint, and explained that "Windham Hill was the hub of this whole thing. Because of that association, new-age has come to be perceived as this West Coast thing". However, Windham Hill's managing director Sam Sutherland argued that even the label's founders William Ackerman and Anne Robinson "shied away from using any idiomatic or generic term at all. It's always seemed a little synthetic", and they stopped making any kind of deliberate protests to the use of the term simply because it was inappropriate. Both Goldstein and Sutherland concluded that the tag helped move merchandise, and that new-age music would be absorbed into the general body of pop music within a few years after 1987.

The New York Times music critic Jon Pareles noted that "new-age music" absorbed other styles in more softer form, but those same, well-defined styles do not need the new-age category, and that "new-age music" resembles other music because it is aimed as a marketing niche—to be a "formula show" designated for urban "ultra-consumers" as status accessory; he also said the Andean, Asian and African traditional music influences evoke the sense of "cosmopolitanism", while nature in the album artwork and sound evoke the "connection to unspoiled landscapes".

=== Alternative terms ===
The borders of this umbrella genre are not well-defined, but music retail stores will include artists in the "new-age" category even if they belong to different genre, and those artists themselves use different names for their style of music.

Kay Gardner called the original new-age music "healing music" or "women's spirituality". Paul Winter, considered a new-age music pioneer, also dismissed the term, preferring "earth music".

The term "instrumental music" or "contemporary instrumental" can include artists who do not use electronic instruments, such as solo pianist David Lanz. Similarly, pianists such as Yanni and Bradley Joseph use this term as well, although they use keyboards to incorporate layered orchestral textures into their compositions. Yanni has distinguished the music genre from the spiritual movement bearing the same name. The term "contemporary instrumental music" was also suggested by Andreas Vollenweider, while "adult alternative" by Gary L. Chappell, which was the term by which Billboard called the new-age and world-music album charts.

== History ==
The concept arose with the involvement of professional musicians in the New-Age movement. Initially, it was of no interest to the musical industry, so the musicians and related staff founded their own small independent recording businesses. Sales reached significant numbers in unusual outlets such as bookstores, gift stores, health-food stores and boutiques, as well as by direct mail. With the demand of a large market, the major recording companies began promoting new-age music in the 1980s.

New-age music was influenced by a wide range of artists from a variety of genres—for example, folk-instrumentalists John Fahey and Leo Kottke, minimalists Terry Riley, Steve Reich, La Monte Young, and Philip Glass, progressive rock acts such as Pink Floyd, ambient pioneer Brian Eno, synthesizer performer Klaus Schulze, and jazz artists Keith Jarrett, Weather Report, Mahavishnu Orchestra, Paul Horn (beginning with 1968's Inside), Paul Winter (beginning in the mid-1960s with the Paul Winter Consort) and Pat Metheny.

Tony Scott's Music for Zen Meditation (1964) is sometimes considered the first new-age recording, but initially it was popular mostly in California, and was not sold nationally until the 1980s. Another school of meditation music arose among the followers of Rajneesh; Deuter recorded D (1971) and Aum (1972), which mixed acoustic and electronic instruments with sounds of the sea. Kay Gardner's song "Lunamuse" (1974) and first recording Mooncircles (1975), which were a synthesis of music, sexuality and Wiccan spirituality, were "new-age music before it got to be new-age music". Her A Rainbow Path (1984) embraced Halpern's theory of healing music from that time with women's spirituality, and she became one of the most popular new-age sacred-music artists. Mike Orme of Stylus Magazine writes that many key Berlin school musicians helped popularise new-age.

Paul Winter's Missa Gaia/Earth Mass (1982) is described as "a masterpiece of New Age ecological consciousness that celebrates the sacredness of land, sky, and sea". His work on the East Coast is considered to be one of the most important musical expressions of new-age spirituality. On the West Coast, musicians concentrated more on music for healing and meditation. The most notable early work was Steven Halpern's Spectrum Suite (1975), the musical purpose of which was described as to "resonate specific areas of the body... it quiets the mind and body", and whose title relates "to the seven tones of the musical scale and the seven colors of the rainbow to the seven etheric energy sources (chakras) in our bodies". In the 1970s his music work, and the theoretical book Tuning the Human Instrument (1979), pioneered the contemporary practice of musical healing in the United States.

In 1976 the record label Windham Hill Records was founded, with an initial $300 investment, and would gross over $26 million annually ten years later. Over the years many record labels were formed that embraced or rejected the new-age designation, such as Narada Productions, Private Music, Music West, Lifestyle, Audion, Sonic Atmospheres, Living Music, Terra (Vanguard Records), Novus Records (which mainly recorded jazz music), FM (CBS Masterworks) and Cinema (Capitol Records).

Between the intentional extremes of the U.S.' coasts are some of the most successful new-age artists, like George Winston and R. Carlos Nakai. Winston's million-selling December (1982), released by Windham Hill Records, was highly popular. Most of Nakai's work, with his first release Changes in 1983, consists of improvised songs in native North American style. During the 1990s, his music became virtual anthems for new-age spirituality.

In 1981, Tower Records in Mountain View, California added a "new age" bin. By 1985, independent and chain record retail stores were adding sections for new age, and major labels began showing interest in the genre, both through acquisition of some existing new-age labels such as Paul Winter's Living Music and through signing of so-called "new-age" artists such as Japanese electronic composer Kitarō and American crossover jazz musician Pat Metheny, both signed by Geffen Records. Most of the major record labels accepted new age artists by the beginning of the next year. In the late 1980s the umbrella genre was the fastest-growing genre with significant radio broadcast. It was seen as an attractive business due to low recording costs.

Stephen Hill founded the new-age radio show Hearts of Space in 1973. In 1983, it was picked up by NPR for syndication to 230 affiliates nationally, and a year later Hill started a record label, Hearts of Space Records. On Valentine's Day in 1987, the former Los Angeles rock radio station KMET changed to a full-time new-age music format with new call letters KTWV, branded as The Wave. During The Wave's new-age period, management told the station employees to refer to The Wave as a "mood service" rather than a "radio station". DJs stopped announcing the titles of the songs, and instead, to maintain an uninterrupted mood, listeners could call a 1–800 phone number to find out what song was playing. News breaks were also re-branded and referred to as "wave breaks". Other new-age-specialty radio programs included Forest's Musical Starstreams and John Diliberto's Echoes. Most major cable television networks have channels that play music without visuals, including channels for New age, such as the "Soundscapes" channel on Music Choice. The two satellite radio companies Sirius Satellite Radio & XM Satellite Radio each had their own channels that played new-age music. Sirius—Spa (Sirius XM) (73), XM—Audio Visions (77). When the two merged in November 2008 and became SiriusXM, the Spa name was retained for the music channel with the majority of Audio Vision's music library being used.

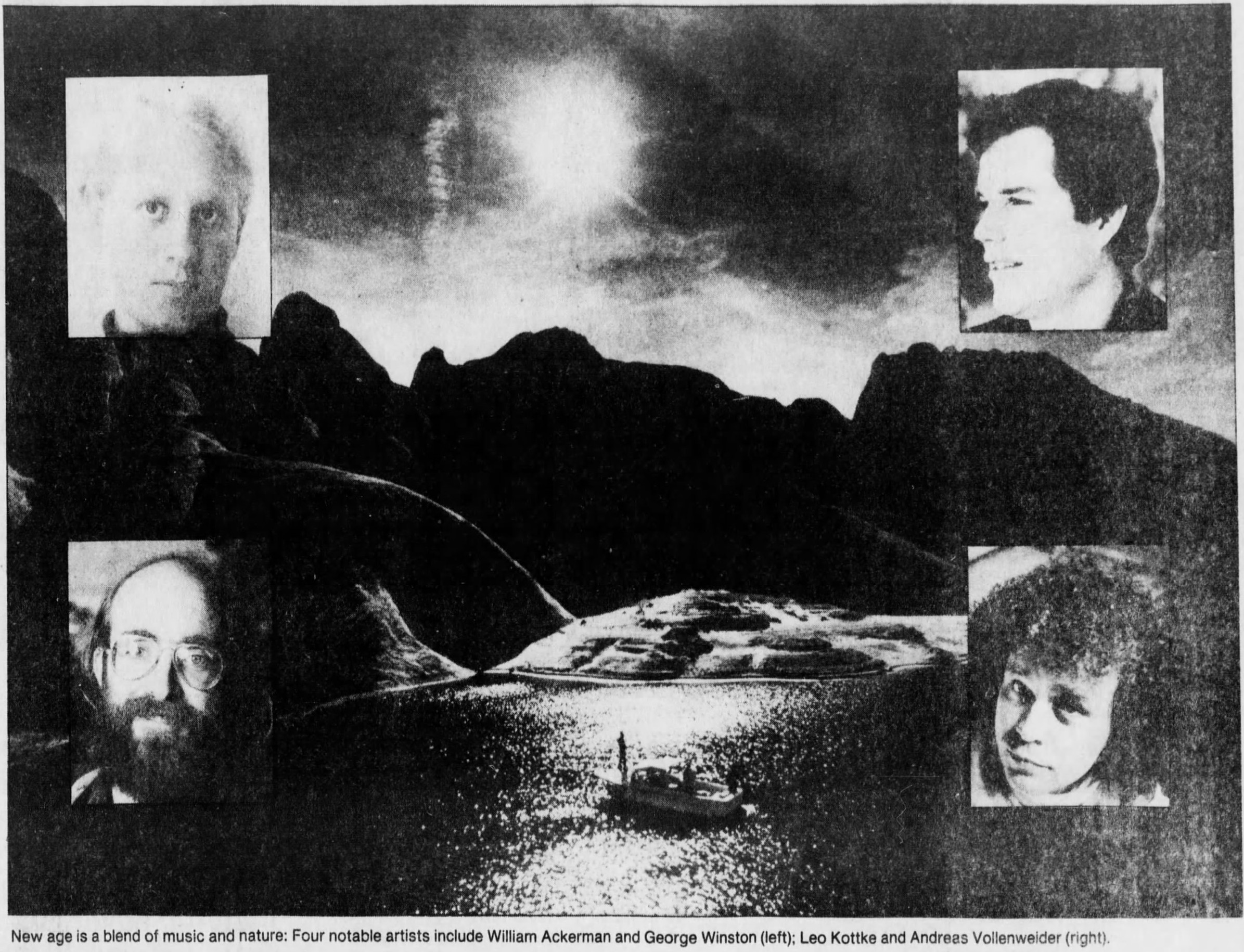
Newspaper clipping, February 8, 1987

In 1987, the Grammy Award for Best New Age Album was introduced, while in 1988 the Billboard's New Age weekly charts. In 1989, Suzanne Doucet produced and held the first international New-Age Music Conference in Los Angeles. By the end of 1989, there were over 150 small independent record labels releasing new-age music, while new-age and adult-alternative programs were carried on hundreds of commercial and college radio stations in the U.S., and over 40 distributors were selling new-age music through mail-order catalogs.

In the 1990s, many small labels of new-age style music emerged in Japan, but for this kind of instrumental music the terms "relaxing" or "healing" music were more popular. Enigma's "Sadeness (Part I)" became an international hit, reaching number one in 24 countries, including the UK, and number five on the US Billboard Hot 100, selling over 5 million worldwide. At the time Holland was the home of two leading European new-age labels—Oreade and Narada Media. Oreade reported that in 1997 the latest trend was "angelic" music, while Narada Media predicted that the genre would develop in the direction of world music (with Celtic, Irish and African influences). In 1995 some "new-age" composers like Kitarō, Suzanne Ciani and Patrick O'Hearn moved from major to independent record labels due to lack of promotion, diminishing sales or limited freedom of creativity.

In 2001, Windham Hill celebrated its 25th anniversary, Narada and Higher Octave Music continued to move into world and ethno-techno music, and Hearts of Space Records were bought by Valley Entertainment. Enya's "Only Time" peaked at #10 on the Billboard Hot 100 chart, and the album A Day Without Rain at #2 on the Billboard 200, making Enya the number one new-age artist of the year.

== Related genres ==
=== Nu-new age ===
Nu-new age
- Other names: New Wave of New Age; New Millennium Exotica
- Stylistic origins: Kosmische musik; post-noise; new age; ambient
- Cultural origins: 2000s, United States

Other topics
- Neo-kosmische; Blogspot scene

Nu-new age (also known as New Wave of New Age or New Millennium Exotica) is a style of music that emerged in the 2000s to describe a revival of new age music. It originated through "converts of the post-noise scene" with artists such as Emeralds, Stellar Om Source and Oneohtrix Point Never. Other artists who have been associated with the style include James Ferraro and Dolphins Into the Future. Independent record label Leaving Records was labelled a "bastion" of the movement.

== See also ==
- Adult contemporary music
- Biomusic (natural soundscapes and animal songs)
- List of new-age music artists
- Lounge music
- Music and sleep
- Pure Moods, a popular 1990s new-age music compilation album
- Sentimental ballad
- Progressive music
