= Peter Michael Hamel =

German contemporary composer

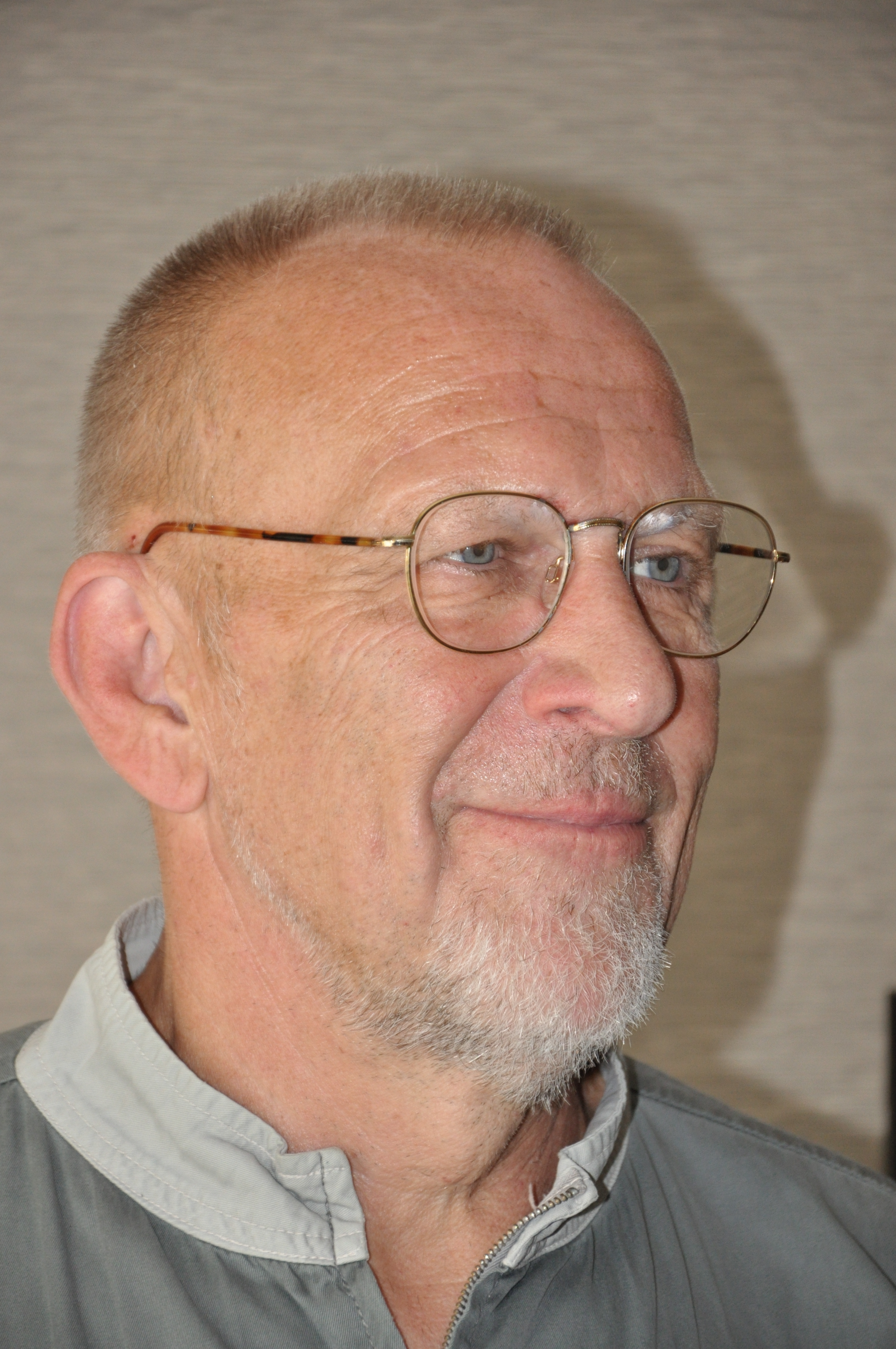

Peter Michael Hamel (born 15 July 1947 in Munich) is a German contemporary composer. Over the course of his work, he has been associated with minimalism and the New Simplicity movement. He is the son of the film director Peter Hamel. Hamel studied musical composition, psychology and sociology in Munich and Berlin with teachers including Günter Bialas and Carl Dahlhaus. He then continued his education abroad, spending several extensive periods in Asia.

In 1970, he founded "Between", an international group dedicated to improvisational music with whom he made 6 records on the intuition/WERGO label and in 1978 in Munich, he founded the Freies Musikzentrum, an institute for musical education and therapy. In 1978, his book Through Music to the Self was published in English translation, obtaining wide circulation in Europe and the U.S.

Between 1997 and 2012, he held an academic post as professor for composition at the Hochschule für Musik und Theater in Hamburg. His orchestral and chamber music is published by Schott, Bärenreiter and E.R.P./Celestial Harmonies. He has composed four operas, many orchestral works (e.g., Gestalt), violin and piano concertos, sacred works for soprano, choirs and orchestra (e.g., Missa); Shoah (a radio composition about the Holocaust), chamber-music compositions (including four string quartets). His First Symphony was premiered by Sergiu Celibidache in 1988; his Second Symphony had its first performance in Munich on April 29, 2008 with the Munich Philharmonic. In 2007 Hamel's Of the Sound of Life for pianist Roger Woodward was published by Celestial Harmonies. In 2009, parts of his work "last minute", about near-death experiences, were premiered on musica viva.

American minimalist composer Terry Riley has said that

Peter's heart did not seem to be aligned alone with the post Webern traditions that had emerged so prevalently in Germany. His sensibilities were attracted more to American minimalism and Indian music and to some degree Rock and Jazz. In this sense he stands apart in the field of modern music of Germany. He has recognized the vast importance of improvisation and being "in the moment" in music performance. He realizes the importance of experimentation and of finding new ways to notate his ideas. However, his music is at the same time rooted in the great German tradition and today he is recognized as a major figure whose compositions have greatly enriched the development of 20th and 21st century repertoire[.]

== Discography ==
- Aura (1972)
- Hamel (1972)
- The Voice of Silence (1972)
- Buddhist Meditation East-West (1975)
- Nada (1977)
- Colours of Time (1980)
- Bardo (1981)
- Transition (1983)
- Organum (1986)
- Let It Play: Selected Pieces 1979-1983 (1987)
- Arrow of Time / The Cycle of Time (1991)
- Violinkonzert Diaphainon Gralbilder (1993)
- De Visione Dei (2001)
- Hamel: String Quartet No. 3, String Quartet No. 4, String Trio (2007)

== See also ==
- List of ambient music artists
