= Irv Teibel =

American field recordist and record producer

- Irv Teibel recording a stream in the mid-1970s

Background information
- Born: Irving Solomon Teibel; 9 October 1938; Buffalo, New York
- Died: 28 October 2010 (aged 72) Austin, Texas
- Genre: Field recording
- Occupations: Sound recordist, graphic designer, photographer
- Labels: Syntonic Research, Inc.; Atlantic
- Website: www.irvteibel.com

Irving Solomon Teibel (October 9, 1938 – October 28, 2010) was an American field recordist, graphic designer, and photographer. His company, Syntonic Research, Inc., is best known for its influential environments psychoacoustic recording series (1969–1979) and The Altered Nixon Speech (1973). Teibel was also an accomplished photographer who worked as an editor for Ziff Davis and photographed for Popular Photography and Car and Driver.

== Biography and work ==
Teibel was born in Buffalo, New York, in 1938. He attended the Rochester Institute of Technology and the Art Center College of Design in Pasadena, California, before serving in the army as a public information specialist in Stuttgart, Germany. During this time he became interested in electronic music and musique concrète and began experimenting with tape at a local radio station. While in Germany he also claimed to have studied briefly with Karlheinz Stockhausen.

Teibel returned from Europe in 1966 and settled in New York City where he worked a number of jobs including associate editor at Ziff Davis. He also took night classes in electronic music at The New School during this time and was a founding resident of the famous Westbeth Artists Community. In 1969, he worked with Tony Conrad on Conrad's film Coming Attractions which involved recording the ocean at Coney Island. After this experience, Teibel became interested in using natural white noise for psychological purposes. Working with neuropsychologist Lou Gerstman at Bell Labs, he processed a short ocean loop recorded at Brighton Beach through an IBM 360 computer to create one continuous thirty-minute soundscape. This became the first environments recording, "The Psychologically Ultimate Seashore". The record was unique for its extremely long playback times—30 minutes per side at 33 1/3 rpm—and could be played at any speed from 16 2/3 up to 45 rpm. "The Psychologically Ultimate Seashore" was one of the first commercially available releases edited with a mainframe computer and one of the earlier examples of commercial quadraphonic sound.

In 1970, Teibel created an environmental sound installation for the Museum of Contemporary Crafts, and in 1971, he began teaching a class in experimental recording techniques at The New School.

In 1973, to demonstrate how magnetic tape could be manipulated, Teibel edited Richard Nixon's August 15 speech to reveal that the president, in fact, had "prior knowledge" of the Watergate break-in. In the subsequent years, Teibel performed as an expert witness for magnetic tape technology.

In 1981, Teibel moved to Austin, Texas, with his then-wife Rosanne. They had two daughters, Jennifer and Dara. In Austin, Teibel was involved in the local Jewish community. He lived there for 29 years until his death on October 28, 2010 at age 72.

His brother Phil was a violinist with the Buffalo Philharmonic.

== Influence ==
Over the years, Teibel's recordings attracted significant national and international attention from publications like The New York Times. Teibel claimed environments 6 was excerpted in the "Sounds of Earth" audio collage aboard the Voyager Spacecraft's Golden Record (this is still unverified). His work also appears in Terrence Malick's Days of Heaven, credited as "special environmental sound recording", and in Errol Morris' Gates of Heaven as "environmental sound". In 2013, his work appeared in Lise Raven's film Kinderwald.

Music critic Robert Christgau described Lou Reed's Metal Machine Music as "Lou's answer to environments" and Lester Bangs included environments 2 on his list of the "Ten Most Ridiculous Records of the Seventies." Musicians Dominick Fernow and Mica Levi have also listed environments LPs as among their favorite recordings. Outside magazine included environments 1 on their list of "The Top 10 Field Recordings". The album cover for the drone metal group Earth's album Earth 2 is an homage to the environments 2 CD with its "special low frequency version" message.

Atlas Obscura has described Teibel as "a forgotten 1970s-era hippie polymath". They go on to explain his lasting influence: "If you flip on a waterfall to fall asleep, if you keep rainymood.com in your bookmarks, if you associate well-being with the sound of streams and crickets or wonder why the beach never quite sounds as tranquil as you imagine, it's because of Teibel."

Pitchfork elaborates on the novelty of Teibel's work: "Now, Teibel's concept—the soothing sounds of nature, or at least a synthesized facsimile of it—is quaint, the wallpaper of therapy waiting rooms and spa foyers. At the time, it was entirely new." They go on to explain the complicated place Teibel's work inhabits in the history of field recording and music: "Here was nature not as it is, but as we hope it'll be, the lullaby of waves without the sand in our trunks."

In February 2018, the Chicago reissue label Numero Group re-released Teibel's original recordings as an ambient sound app for iOS devices.

== Discography ==
=== environments series ===
- environments 1 (SD 66001, 1969)
- environments 2 (SD 66002, 1970)
- environments 3 (SD 66003, 1971)
- environments 4 (SD 66004, 1974)
- environments 5 (SD 66005, 1974)
- environments 6 (SD 66006, 1974)
- environments 7 (SD 66007, 1976)
- environments 8 (SD 66008, 1974)
- environments 9 (SD 66009, 1979)
- environments 10 (SD 66010, 1979)
- environments 11 (SD 66011, 1979)

=== Other recordings ===
- The Altered Nixon Speech (SRI 7004, 1973)
- The Erickson Tapes (SD 66100, 1974) with harpsichordist Raymond Erickson

=== Published books ===
- The Complete Compendium of Universal Knowledge by William Ralston Balch (facsimile of 1895 original, Simulacrum Press, 1973)
