= Time's Arrow =

Time's Arrow may refer to:

- "Time's Arrow" (short story), a 1950 short story by Arthur C. Clarke
- Time's Arrow (novel), a 1991 novel by Martin Amis
- "Time's Arrow" (Star Trek: The Next Generation), a 1992 two-part episode of Star Trek: The Next Generation
- Time's Arrow (EP), a 2011 release by the American artist Prurient
- "Time's Arrow", a 2012 orchestral work by English composer Anthony Payne
- "Time's Arrow" (BoJack Horseman), a 2017 episode of BoJack Horseman
- Time's Arrow (album), a 2023 album by the English electronic music band Ladytron

== See also ==
- Arrow of time, a direction of time on a four-dimensional relativistic map of the world (as per Arthur Eddington)
- Time's Arrow, Time's Cycle, a 1987 book by Stephen Jay Gould
