= Deuter =

- Born: Chaitanya Georg Deuter; February 1, 1945 (age 81); Falkenhagen, Germany
- Genre: New Age
- Occupation: Musician
- Instruments: Sitar; Flute; Piano; Guitar; Keyboard
- Labels: Kuckuck/Celestial Harmonies; New Earth
- Website: cgdeuter.com

Chaitanya Georg Deuter (born February 1, 1945), known simply as Deuter, is a German new-age musician known for his meditative style that blends Eastern and Western musical elements.

He was born Georg Deuter in 1945 in Falkenhagen, and taught himself flute and guitar. His debut recording D was released in 1971 by Kuckuck Schallplatten. It combines elements of krautrock and New Age music through its combination of acoustic, electronic and ethnic musical elements with natural sounds. Over the next two decades the Kuckuck label released nearly 20 Deuter albums.

Deuter later traveled to Pune, India, changing his name to Chaitanya Hari and studying with the spiritual teacher Rajneesh. In the 1990s Deuter moved to Santa Fe and began recording with New Earth Records. He has released over 60 albums, many of them intended for meditation, relaxing and healing.

== Discography ==
- 1971 - D
- 1972 - Aum
- 1972 - Princess of Dawn: Soundtracks
- 1974 - Maschine Nr. 9 (Headmovie)
- 1975 - Kundalini Meditation Music
- 1975 - Nadabrahma Meditation Music
- 1975 - Nataraj Meditation Music
- 1975 - Mandala Meditation Music
- 1975 - Whirling Meditation Music
- 1975 - Devavani Meditation Music
- 1975 - Tea from an empty Cup
- 1976 - Riding the Bull
- 1976 - Celebration
- 1976 - Dynamic Meditation Music
- 1978 - Haleakala
- 1978 - Ecstasy
- 1978 - Sea and Silence (first edition)
- 1978 - Flowers of Silence (first edition)
- 1979 - Orange Tree (first edition)
- 1980 - Like the Wind in the Trees (first edition)
- 1981 - Silence Is the Answer
- 1982 - Cicada
- 1984 - Nirvana Road
- 1984 - Phantasiereisen
- 1984 - San
- 1986 - Bashos Pond
- 1986 - Call of the Unknown: Selected Pieces 1972-1986
- 1987 - Phantasiereisen
- 1988 - Land of Enchantment
- 1990 - Healing Hypno Trances
- 1990 - Petrified Forest
- 1991 - Sands of Time
- 1992 - Henon
- 1992 - Tao Te King Music & Words
- 1993 - Relax
- 1994 - Inside Hypno Relaxation
- 1994 - Terra magica: Planet of Light
- 1995 - Klänge der Liebe Relaxation
- 1995 - Wind & Mountain
- 1995 - In Trance Hypno
- 1995 - Chakras
- 1996 - Tu dir gut
- 1997 - Nada Himalaya Tibetan Bells
- 1998 - Reiki Hands of Light
- 1998 - Die Blaue Blume
- 1998 - Chakra
- 1999 - Garden of the Gods
- 2000 - Männerrituale Music & Words
- 2000 - Frauenrituale Music & Words
- 2000 - Sun Spirit
- 2000 - Reiki: Music For The Harmonious Spirit
- 2001 - Buddha Nature
- 2001 - Wind & Mountain
- 2002 - Like the Wind in the Trees
- 2003 - Sea & Silence
- 2004 - Earth Blue
- 2005 - Tibet: Nada Himalaya, Vol. 2
- 2005 - East of the Full Moon
- 2007 - Koyasan: Reiki Sound Healing
- 2008 - Spiritual Healing
- 2009 - Atmospheres
- 2009 - Notes From a Planet
- 2009 - Eternity
- 2009 - Celebration of Light: Music for Winter and the Christmas Season
- 2010 - Mystery of Light
- 2011 - Empty Sky
- 2012 - Flowers of Silence
- 2012 - Ocean Waves
- 2013 - Dream Time
- 2015 - Mystic Voyage
- 2015 - Reiki Hands of Love
- 2015 - Illumination of the Heart
- 2016 - Immortelle
- 2017 - Space
- 2017 - Bamboo Forest
- 2018 - Sattva Temple Trance
- 2019 - Mirage
- 2021 - Song of the Last Tree
- 2024 - Komorebi - sunlight through trees
- 2025 - Mångata
- 2026 - What the Elephant Told

== See also ==
- List of ambient music artists
