= Environments (album series) =

Series of albums of natural sounds

Environments 1 (1969)

Environments (stylized in all lowercase) is a series of LPs, cassettes, 8-track cartridges and CDs created by producer and sound recordist Irv Teibel (1938–2010) for Syntonic Research Inc. between 1969 and 1979. The series consists of recordings of natural sounds such as a seashore with crashing waves or a thunderstorm with falling rain, without musical accompaniment. The series helped ignite a worldwide interest in field recordings which resulted in many imitations being released throughout the 1970s, 1980s and 1990s both with, and without, music.

== Environments LPs ==
The original series, distributed by Atlantic Records, comprised 11 long-playing records with a different environment on each side, for 22 total Environments.

=== Environments 1 (1969) ===
- Side 1: The Psychologically Ultimate Seashore (30:00)

The initial recording in the series goes back to 1968. Working under the direction of Tony Conrad and Beverly Grant Conrad, Teibel recorded ocean waves at Coney Island for use in their feature film Coming Attractions (1970). Teibel immediately sensed the marketability of this material, noting its effect on improving concentration, enhancing sleep and sex, and imparting a sense of calm to the listener. Conrad, who wished to credit Walter De Maria for his prior usage of ocean recordings, was not willing to become a partner in the Syntonic Research enterprise as envisioned by Teibel, so Teibel parted ways with the "Coming Attractions" project. Subsequently, Teibel himself felt unsatisfied with his results — though his Uher stereo reel-to-reel tape recorder had faithfully captured the sounds of the surf, he felt that they were less convincing on playback. A friend of Teibel's, Louis Gerstman, had access to an IBM 360 computer, and he and Teibel played around with processing the recordings until eventually the two of them hit upon a series of manipulations (basically some rolling filtering and overdubbing) which sounded 'more real than real.'

- Side 2: Optimum Aviary (30:00)

For the second side of the LP, Teibel recorded an enclosure of birds at the Bronx Zoo aviary.

=== Environments 2 (1970) ===
- Side One: Tintinnabulation (30:00)

Alone among the Environments series, Tintinnabulation is not natural sounds at all but a series of computer-generated bell sounds playable at any speed from 16 2/3 to 78 rpm. The CD reissue opted for the 16 2/3 rpm speed.

- Side Two: Dawn at New Hope, PA (30:00)

Field recording with owls, crows, doves, insects, dogs and geese recorded early one morning in June 1969.

A 1987 Special Low Frequency Version was released in 1987.

=== Environments 3 (1971) ===
- Side One: Be-In (34:00)

The sounds of a spontaneous gathering in Central Park, April 6, 1969, with strolling musicians, dancers, anti-war protesters, and fragments of conversations. Most of the Environments recordings have been imitated, but this one—a distinct time & place now gone—remains unique.

- Side Two: Dusk at New Hope, PA (37:00)

A warm summer night (recorded August 1970) deep in the backwoods of Eastern Pennsylvania, surrounded by insects and the occasional distant hound.

=== Environments 4 (1974) ===
- Side One: Ultimate Thunderstorm (32:00)

Recorded from a balcony in the city.

- Side Two: Gentle Rain in a Pine Forest (34:00)

Note: Announced inside Environments 4 but never released: Children at Play/Cocktail Party (was to be Environments 9) and Spanish Train/Cable Car (S.F.) (was to be Environments 10).

=== Environments 5 (1974) ===
- Side One: Ultimate Heartbeat (20:00)

A stethoscope heartbeat recording which can be used to calm infants, aid meditation or enhance sex.

- Side Two: Wind in the Trees (34:00)

The soft rush of wind rustling the leaves of a grove in late autumn.

=== Environments 6 (1974) ===
- Side One: Dawn in the Okefenokee Swamp (34:00)
- Side Two: Dusk in the Okefenokee Swamp (34:00)

Accessible only by airboat, Georgia's verdant wetlands are home to thousands of species both large and small, including growling alligators. Both recordings were taken at the same location, but ten hours apart.

=== Environments 7 (1976) ===
- Side One: Intonation (30:00)

A blended chorus of male and female singers intoning an "Om" chant.

- Side Two: Summer Cornfield (35:00)

The cicadas, grasshoppers and katydids of a Vermont field provide a blanket of pulsating sound, subtly enhanced by further bug sounds from an EML synthesizer.

=== Environments 8 (1974) ===
- Side One: Wood-Masted Sailboat (34:00)

Creaking boards, straining lines, and a taut canvas recorded aboard a 42-foot sloop under full sail.

- Side Two: A Country Stream (34:00)

A small meandering stream near Stockbridge, Massachusetts, with insects, birds and the sound of water flowing over rocks.

=== Environments 9 (1979) ===
- Side One: Pacific Ocean (30:00)

Seashore sounds including seagulls.

- Side Two: Caribbean Lagoon (30:00)

Gently lapping waves on a white sand beach.

Test Pressing: The jacket and the pressing label for Environments 9 list SRI 4434, Caribbean Lagoon, as side A. The jacket for side B of the pressing lists SRI 4433, Slow Ocean, but the actual pressing label lists Pacific Ocean.

=== Environments 10 (1979) ===
- Side One: English Meadow (30:00)

Songbirds recorded in the Sussex countryside, near the Long Man of Wilmington chalk drawing.

- Side Two: Night in the Country (30:00)

The sound of a vast sea of insects, primarily cicadas.

Test Pressing: The jacket and the pressing label for Environments 10 list SRI 4435, English Meadow for side A. The jacket and the pressing label for side B list SRI 4432, Night in the Forest.

=== Environments 11 (1979) ===
- Side One: Alpine Blizzard (30:00)

Howling wind and banging shutters in a ski chateau.

- Side Two: Country Thunderstorm (30:00)

A quiet afternoon of insects and birds gradually gives way to distant thunder, approaching rain squalls, and then a full-on rainstorm.

Test Pressing: The jacket and the pressing label for Environments 11 list SRI 4436, Wind/Hail Storm, for side A. The jacket and the pressing label for side B list SRI 4437, Country Thunderstorm.

== Environments cassettes ==
The cassettes, marketed by Syntonic Research, consist of two half-hour sides with the same program on each side (except #14). These are the same recordings as on the LP series.

1. Slow Ocean
2. Ultimate Thunderstorm
3. Wood-Masted Sailboat
4. English Meadow
5. Night in the Country
6. Caribbean Lagoon
7. Country Stream
8. Wind in the Trees
9. Heartbeat
10. Gentle Rain in a Pine Forest
11. English Meadow
12. Intonation
13. Summer Cornfield
14. Okefenokee Swamp (Dawn & Dusk)
15. Country Thunderstorm
16. Alpine Blizzard

== Environments CDs ==
The compact discs, released by Atlantic Records in 1987, provide 60 minutes of material.

1. Psychologically Ultimate Seashore - (The original Environments 1 (side 1) recording remixed and extended)
2. Tintinnabulation - (The original Environments 2 (side 1) recording, slowed to half-speed to make a full hour)
3. Dawn & Dusk at New Hope, PA - (The original Environments 2 (side 2) and Environments 3 (side 2) recordings)

== Environments downloads ==
In 2017, all 22 Environments were made available by the Numero Group on iTunes in extended edits, up to an hour long.

== Environments app ==
In February 2018, an iOS app was released featuring all 22 released Environments albums. Released by The Numero Group and Syntonic Research. The app would be issued for Android in April 2019 and updated on both platforms with an edit of the CD version of "Tintinnabulation" added.
