= The Complete Compendium of Universal Knowledge =

1891 encyclopedia by William Ralston Balch

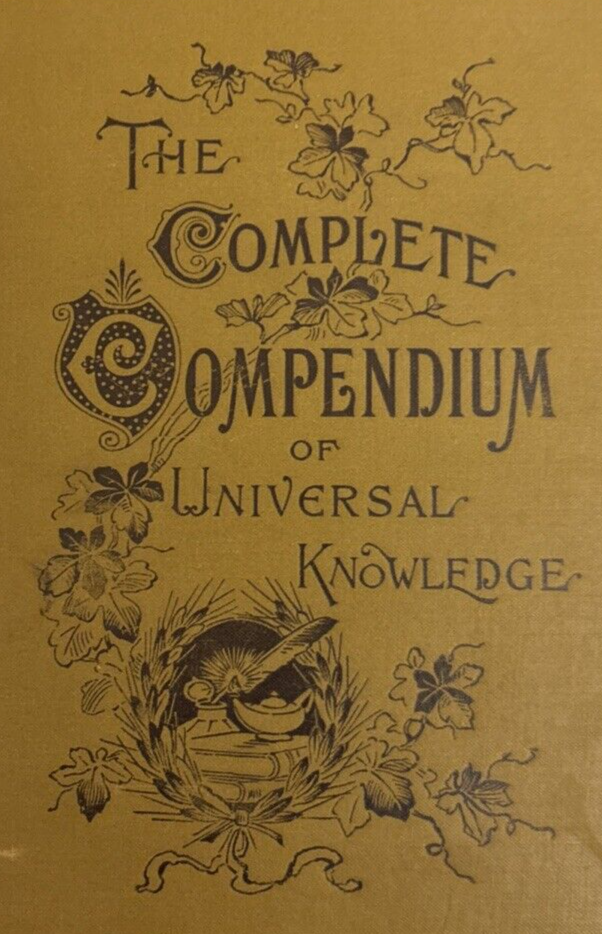
- First edition cover, 1891
- Author: William Ralston Balch
- Language: English
- Genre: Encyclopedia
- Published: 1891
- Publisher: Franklin Square Bible House (Philadelphia)
- Publication place: United States
- Pages: 813
- OCLC: 41926892

The Complete Compendium of Universal Knowledge, Containing All You Want to Know of Language, History, Government, Business and Social Forms, and a Thousand and One Other Useful Subjects is an 1891 encyclopedia by William Ralston Balch. As its title suggests, it "sought to compile all knowledge of the universe into one digestible read". Topics covered were a smorgasbord of subjects including "how to cure stammering, how to clean and brighten our Brussels carpets, how to change our name and, of course, how to get rich... recipes ... and the fate of the apostles, how many Union Army troops died in the Civil War, and the cost of constructing a mile of railroad". It was republished in 1895 (OCLC 1387790) and in the 20th century by Irv Teibel (OCLC 905560405, Simulacrum Press), and in the 21st century (ISBN 1340654598, Palala Press and others).

Balch wrote other encyclopedias around the same time including The People's Dictionary and Every-day Encyclopedia in 1883 and Ready Reference: The Universal Cyclopaedia Containing Everything that Everybody Wants to Know in 1901.
