= Kuckuck Schallplatten =

German record label

- Parent company: Celestial Harmonies
- Founded: 1969
- Founder: Eckart Rahn
- Status: Moved to Berlin, Germany, in 2005
- Distributor: Celestial Harmonies
- Genre: Progressive rock
- Country of origin: Germany
- Location: Munich
- Official website: Celestial Harmonies

Kuckuck Schallplatten (engl.: Cuckoo Records) is a German record label founded in August 1969 by Eckart Rahn, Mal Sondock and the advertising agency ConceptData in Munich, growing out of his music-publishing company E.R.P. Musikverlag, which was founded on April 1, 1968. It was distributed by Deutsche Grammophon (Polydor). It is the first German progressive rock label. After being purchased by Celestial Harmonies, it is now the longest-surviving independent label in Germany. Most of its recordings have been reissued on CD, and all are now available as downloads.

== Artists ==
- Antiteater (Peer Raben and filmmaker Rainer Werner Fassbinder)
- Armageddon
- Murphy Blend
- CWT
- Deuter
- Out of Focus
- Jack Grunsky
- Jon Mark
- Peter Michael Hamel
- Hanuman
- Sonny Hennig
- Ihre Kinder
- Hans Otte
- Terry Riley
- Eberhard Schoener
- Ernst Schultz
- Lied des Teufels
- Keith West
- Sam Spence

Some early releases by Kitaro were licensed to the label through Pony Canyon Inc. of Tokyo, Japan.

== See also ==
- List of record labels
