= Cusco discography =

New age band Cusco released twenty-two studio albums and five compilation albums between 1980 and 2012.

== Studio albums ==
- Desert Island (1980)
- Cusco II (1981)
- Cool Islands (1982)
- Planet Voyage (1982)
- Virgin Islands (1983)
- Island Cruise (1984)
- Apurimac (1985; worldwide 1988) *
- Concierto de Aranjuez (1986)
- Tales from a Distant Land (1987)
- Mystic Island (1989) *
- Ring der Delphine (1989)
- Water Stories (1990) *
- Sielmann 2000 Soundtrack (1991)
- Cusco 2000 (1992) *
- Cusco 2002 (1993) *
- Australia (1993)
- Apurimac II: Return to Ancient America (1994) *
- A Choral Christmas (1995) *
- Ring of the Dolphin (1996) *
- Apurimac III: Nature - Spirit - Pride (1997) *
- Ancient Journeys: A Vision of the New World (2000) *
- Inner Journeys: Myth + Legends (2003) *

== Compilations ==
- The Magic Sound of Cusco (1988)
- The Best of Cusco (1997) *
- Best of Cusco: Dreams & Fantasies (1998)
- The Early Best of Cusco (1999)
- Essential Cusco: The Journey (2005) *
- The Best of Cusco (Ales) (2008)
- The Ultimate Cusco Retrospective (2012)

== Footnotes ==
- indicates a Higher Octave Music release.
