= The Best of Cusco =

Compilation album by Cusco
- Released: 1997
- Recorded: 1984–1996
- Genre: Cross-cultural new-age
- Label: Higher Octave

Cusco chronology
The Magic Sound of Cusco (1988)	The Best of Cusco (1997)	Dreams & Fantasies (1998)

The Best of Cusco is a compilation album by German cross-cultural new-age band Cusco. It was released in early 1997 and includes tracks from the Higher Octave albums Apurimac (released 1988) through Ring of the Dolphin (1996), with the exception that A Choral Christmas (1995) is not represented. Some online retailers also show this item as a release by the label Kitty under the title "History".

== Track listing ==
CD
No.	Title	Writer(s)	Original album	Length
1.	"Montezuma"	Michael Holm; Ralph Stemmann	Apurímac II: Return to Ancient America	5:18
2.	"North Easter"	Andy Marx; Kristian Schultze	Cusco 2000	3:49
3.	"Waters of Cesme"	Michael Holm	Ring of the Dolphin	4:29
4.	"Flying Condor"	Kristian Schultze	Cusco 2000	5:23
5.	"Bur Said"	Kristian Schultze	Water Stories	5:17
6.	"Tupac Amaru"	Kristian Schultze	Apurimac	3:03
7.	"Didjeridoo"	Michael Holm	Cusco 2002	3:37
8.	"Lonely Rose"	Michael Holm; Steve Singer	Mystic Island	5:02
9.	"Flute Battle"	Michael Holm; Kristian Schultze	Apurimac	2:34
10.	"Ring of the Dolphin"	Michael Holm; Kristian Schultze	Ring of the Dolphin	8:11
11.	"Quetzal's Feather"	Michael Holm; Kristian Schultze	Apurímac II: Return to Ancient America	5:02
Total length:				51:45

== Charts ==
The Best of Cusco reached #11 on the Billboard Top New Age Albums chart in 1997.
