= Inner Journeys =

Inner Journeys: Myth + Legends

Studio album by Cusco
- Released: 25 March 2003
- Genre: New-age
- Label: Higher Octave

Cusco chronology
Ancient Journeys (2000)	Inner Journeys: Myth + Legends (2003)

Professional ratings
Review scores
Source	Rating
Allmusic	3/5 stars

Inner Journeys: Myth + Legends is an album by German cross-cultural new-age band Cusco, released in 2003. The album peaked at number 6 on the Billboard Top New Age albums chart. In 2004, it was nominated for the Grammy award for Best New Age, Ambient, or Chant Album.

With this album, the band simultaneously explores new territory by covering Greek Mythology with its musical concepts, and also revisits a more classic Cusco sound by reintroducing the flute sounds of the early years (Water Stories) and the strings, guitars, and atmospheres of their mid-career commercial high points of Cusco 2000 and Apurimac II.

== Track listing ==
1. "Oracle Of Delphi"
2. "Eros And Psyche"
3. "Ariadne"
4. "The Nine Muses"
5. "Odysseus And The Sirens"
6. "Aphrodite"
7. "Janus"
8. "Orpheus And Eurydice"
9. "Pan And The Nymph"
10. "Poseidon"

== Album credits ==
- Kristian Schultze - Arranger, keyboard, programming
- Michael Holm – Arranger, keyboard, producer
- Johan Daansen – Acoustic guitar
- Ernst Stroehr - Percussion
- Jane Bogaert - Vocals
- Matt Marshall – Executive producer
- Dan Selene – Executive producer
- Ron McMaster – Digital mastering
- William Aura – Mastering
- Frank Von Dem Bottlenberg - Mixing
- Murry Whiteman – Cover art
- Gina Grimes – Director of creative services
- Debra Holland – Liner notes
- Cusco – Main performer
