= Apurímac =

Apurímac is the name of:

- Apurímac River, a river in the south-eastern parts of central Peru
- Department of Apurímac, a region in the south-eastern parts of central Peru
- Three albums by the German new-age band Cusco:
  - Apurimac (album)
  - Apurimac II
  - Apurimac III
