= Virgin Islands (album) =

Virgin Island

Studio album by Cusco
- Released: 1983
- Genre: Andean new age
- Label: Prudence

Cusco chronology
| Planet Voyage (1982) | Virgin Island (1983) | Island Cruise (1984) |

Virgin Islands is an album by the German andean new age band Cusco. It was released originally in 1983 and is currently available from the Prudence label under the title Virgin Island.

This album contains three tracks which later appeared on the 1990 release Water Stories on Higher Octave Music (Sun of Jamaica, Seychelles and Java). The album also contains a track called Alcatraz, but the music is completely different from the track of the same name on Desert Island and Water Stories, and is actually the original mix of the track Bermudas on the following Island Cruise album. Many discographies show this as a 1984 release, but early LP pressings verify the 1983 release year.

== Track listing ==
1. "Virgin Islands"
2. "Santo Domingo"
3. "Easter Islands"
4. "Bali"
5. "Philippines"
6. "Sun of Jamaica"
7. "Alcatraz" (Virgin Islands track)
8. "Seychelles"
9. "Samoa"
10. "Fiji Islands"
11. "Java"
12. "Saipan Islands"

== Album credits ==
- Rainer Pietsch – Keyboard
- Todd Canedy – drums, percussion
- Kristian Schultze – Arranger, keyboard
- Gunther Gebauer – Bass guitar
- Paul Vincent – Guitar
- Munich Philharmonic – Orchestra
- Jochen Scheffter – Engineer
- Cusco – Main performer
- Michael Holm – Arranger, producer, keyboard
