= Ancient Journeys =

Ancient Journeys: A Vision of the New World

Studio album by Cusco
- Released: 2000
- Genre: Cross-cultural new-age
- Label: Higher Octave

Cusco chronology
Apurimac III (1997)	Ancient Journeys: A Vision of the New World (2000)	Inner Journeys (2003)

Ancient Journeys: A Vision of the New World is an album by German cross-cultural new-age band Cusco, released in 2000. Released three years after the previous album, this one peaked at #2 on the Billboard Top New Age Albums chart.

This album continues somewhat in the flavor of Apurimac III, but is dedicated to ancient journeys of adventure and discovery. The musical concepts reflect on ancient rhythms and melodies, and depict ancient kingdoms, sea voyages, conquests and land explorations that cross continents.

== Track listing ==
1. "Da Gama" (featuring Ottmar Liebert)
2. "Conquistadores"
3. "Land of the Midnight Sun"
4. "Tigris & Euphrates"
5. "Byzantium"
6. "The Journeys of Marco Polo"
7. "The Horsemen of Bulgar"
8. "Kublai Khan"
9. "The Crusades"

== Album credits ==
- Kristian Schultze – Arranger, keyboard, percussion,
- Manuel Lopez – Acoustic guitar
- Dan Selene – Executive producer
- Michael Holm – Arranger, producer, percussion, keyboard
- Johan Daansen – Guitar
- David Donnelly – Digital mixing
- Debra Holland – Percussion
- Ottmar Liebert – Guitar
- Klaus Strazicky – Mixing
- Cusco – Main performer
- Matt Marshall – Executive producer
- Biboul Darouiche – Percussion
