= Apurimac II =

Apurímac II

Studio album by Cusco
- Released: 1994
- Genre: Andean new age

Cusco chronology
Australia (1993)	Apurímac II (1994)	A Choral Christmas (1995)

Professional ratings
Review scores
Source	Rating
Allmusic	3 /5 stars

Apurímac II: Return to Ancient America is an album by German andean new age band Cusco, released in 1994 on the Higher Octave music label. The album peaked at #8 on the Billboard Top New Age albums chart.

It is second in the Apurímac series, and contains native Central American and South American sounds reincarnated with a very modern European musical touch, and has a much more lush, contemporary sound than the first Apurimac album, or other Cusco albums in general. Sounds of the ancient Mesoamerican civilizations Maya, Inca and Aztec are represented, and its orchestral touches remind of the then recent Cusco 2000 and Cusco 2002 albums, though on this album they are used more sparingly. This album is also a commercial high-water mark in the band's career, selling more copies overall than any other Cusco album. The track "Montezuma" was featured as bumper music on Coast to Coast AM, and was also used for a Bud Ice television commercial. Some versions of this album have the final track titled as "Temple of the Forgotten".

== Track listing ==
All songs written by Kristian Schultze and Michael Holm except as indicated.

1. "Montezuma" (Michael Holm/Ralph Stemman)
2. "Quetzal's Feather"
3. "Dance of the Sun Priest"
4. "Tula"
5. "Yucatán"
6. "Xul-Kan, King of Palenque"
7. "Maya Temple"
8. "Mexica"
9. "Goddess of the Moon" (Michael Holm/Ralph Stemman)
10. "Temple of Remembrance"

== Album credits ==
- Matt Marshall – Executive producer
- Kristian Schultze – Arranger, programming
- Dan Selene – Executive producer
- Joseph L. Steiner III – Digital remastering
- Murry Whiteman – Design
- Dee Westlund – Art direction
- Frank Von Dem – Bottlenburg mixing
- Michael Holm – Producer, mixing
- Cusco – Main performer
