= Water Stories (Cusco album) =

Compilation album by Cusco
- Released: 1990
- Recorded: 1980–1990
- Genre: Andean new age
- Label: Higher Octave

Cusco chronology
Ring der Delphine (1989)	Water Stories (1990)	Sielmann 2000 Soundtrack (1991)

Water Stories is an album by German andean new age band Cusco. It was released in 1990 as their third album for the Higher Octave music label. The album peaked at #11 on the Billboard Top New Age albums chart in 1991.

The album celebrates some of the world's major water bodies and surrounding areas. Although presented as a proper album, it contains tracks from throughout the early career of the band, and was designed as a sort of "best of" collection. Compared to Mystic Island, this album's tracks mostly come from the albums Cusco II, Virgin Islands and Ring der Delphine, but has selected tracks from other albums as well, as well as the brand new track "Chorus", an alternate version of "Flying Condor" from the Apurimac album. Each track has been remastered for this release. Additionally, some of the tracks have been edited to shorten them, most noticeably "Bur Said", "Jebel at Tarik", and "Bodensee".

== Track listing ==
1. "Waters of Cesme"
2. "Java"
3. "Seychelles"
4. "Lake Erie"
5. "Bur Said"
6. "Jebel at Tarik"
7. "Sun of Jamaica"
8. "Lake of the Ozarks"
9. "Alcatraz"
10. "Bodensee"
11. "Aurora"
12. "Chorus"

== Album credits ==
- Michael Holm – Arranger, producer, vocals, keyboard
- Kristian Schultze – Arranger, keyboard
- Billy Lang – Guitar
- Johan Daansen - Guitar
- Todd Canedy - Drums
- Gunther Gebauer Bass
