= Apurimac III =

Apurimac III: Nature – Spirit – Pride

Studio album by Cusco
- Released: 1997
- Genre: Cross-cultural new-age
- Label: Higher Octave

Cusco chronology
Ring of the Dolphin (1996)	Apurimac III: Nature – Spirit – Pride (1997)	Ancient Journeys (2000)

Apurimac III: Nature – Spirit – Pride is an album by the German cross-cultural new-age band Cusco, released in 1997. The album peaked at #7 on the Billboard Top New Age Albums chart.

All tracks on this album are related to the Native American cultures of North America. The beats, chants, and flute works depict a Native American musical style, though are made more accessible to modern ears through the use of overtly synthesized instrumentation and percussive rhythms.

== Track listing ==
All songs written by Michael Holm and Kristian Schultze except where indicated.

1. "Ghost Dance" (traditional)
2. "Kokopelli's Dream" (featuring Craig Chaquico)
3. "Geronimo's Laughter"
4. "Medicine Man"
5. "Little Pigeon and Crazy Horse"
6. "Pahrump — Big Water" (Holm)
7. "Dream Catcher"
8. "Legend in the Redwoods" (Schultze)
9. "The Hunt"
10. "White Buffalo" (Holm)

== Album credits ==
- Kristian Schultze — Arranger, programming
- Maria Ehrenreich — Director, production director
- Dan Selene — Executive producer
- Michael Holm — Arranger, producer, mixing
- Frank Von Dem Bottlenburg — Engineer, mixing
- Giuseppe Solera — Flute
- Murry Whiteman — Paintings, photography
- Johan Daansen — Acoustic guitar
- Debra Holland — Liner notes
- Craig Chaquico — Guitar, performer
- William Aura — Digital assembly, digital mastering
- Matt Marshall — Executive producer
