= 46th Annual Grammy Awards =

2004 US music awards ceremony

- Date: February 8, 2004
- Location: Staples Center, Los Angeles, California
- Most awards: Beyoncé (5)
- Most nominations: Beyoncé, Jay-Z, Outkast, Pharrell Williams (6 each)
- Website: https://www.grammy.com/awards/46th-annual-grammy-awards

Television/radio coverage
- Network: CBS

The 46th Annual Grammy Awards honored the best recordings, compositions, and artists from October 1, 2002, through September 30, 2003, as chosen by the members of the Recording Academy, on February 8, 2004. In its 4th year at the Staples Center in Los Angeles, California, the ceremony was broadcast on tape delay by CBS.

Tied for the most nominations, with six each, were Beyoncé, Jay-Z, Outkast and Pharrell Williams. With five awards for her debut album Dangerously in Love and the lead single Crazy in Love, Beyoncé was the most awarded artist, becoming also the fourth female artist to achieve five Grammys in one ceremony. Outkast was the most awarded group with three awards, including Album of the Year for Speakerboxxx/The Love Below. American rock band Evanescence was recognized as Best New Artist.

== Background ==
=== Effects of the Super Bowl XXXVIII controversy ===
Janet Jackson was originally scheduled to perform during the tribute to Luther Vandross during the ceremony. However, due to an incident involving Jackson during the Super Bowl XXXVIII halftime show the previous week, where her breast was briefly revealed by Justin Timberlake, Jackson was blacklisted by CBS's parent company Viacom and her invitation to the ceremony was rescinded. Despite his involvement in the "wardrobe malfunction", Timberlake was still invited, and used one of his acceptance speeches to apologize for the incident. CBS also broadcast the ceremony on a five-minute tape delay.

== Performances ==
Performers
| Artist(s) | Song |
|---|---|
| Prince; Beyoncé | "Purple Rain" "Baby I’m a Star" "Crazy in Love" "Let’s Go Crazy" |
| Sting; Vince Gill; Dave Matthews; Pharell | Tribute to The Beatles "I Saw Her Standing There" |
| Christina Aguilera | "Beautiful" |
| The White Stripes | "Seven Nation Army" "Death Letter" |
| Martina McBride | "Concrete Angel" |
| Alicia Keys; Celine Dion; Richard Marx | Tribute to Luther Vandross "A House is Not a Home" "Dance with My Father" |
| Sting; Sean Paul | "Roxanne" |
| Justin Timberlake; Arturo Sandoval | "Señorita" |
| The Black Eyed Peas; Justin Timberlake | "Where is the Love" |
| Beyoncé | "Dangerously in Love 2" |
| “Minister” Samuel L. Jackson; Earth, Wind & Fire; OutKast; Robert Randolph and the Family Band; George Clinton; Parliament-Funkadelic | Tribute to Funk Music "Shining Star" "The Way You Move" "I Need More Love" "Give Up the Funk"/ "Get Low" |
| Foo Fighters; Chick Corea | "Times Like These" |
| Sarah McLaughlan; Allison Kraus | "Fallen" |
| Emmylou Harris; Billy Bob Thornton; Dwight Yoakam; Jackson Browne; Jorge Calderon; Timothy B. Schmit | Tribute to Warren Zevon "Keep Me in Your Heart" |
| OutKast | "Hey Ya!" |

== Presenters ==
- Gwen Stefani & Quentin Tarantino - presented Best Contemporary R&B Album
- Ellen DeGeneres - talks about the 40th anniversary of The Beatles landing in America and introduced Dave Matthews, Vince Gill, Sting, and Pharrell Williams.
- Queen Latifah - introduced Christina Aguilera
- John Mayer & Matthew Perry - presented Best Pop Performance by a Duo or Group with Vocals
- Beck - introduced the White Stripes
- B.B. King & Aerosmith - paid tribute to The Funk Brothers, a Lifetime Achievement Award recipient and presented Best Rap Album
- Marg Helgenberger - introduced Martina McBride
- Amy Lee, Amber Tamblyn & Jakob Dylan - paid tribute to Carole King and Gerry Goffin, Trustees Award recipients and presented Best Male Pop Vocal Performance
- Patti LaBelle - introduced Alicia Keys, Celine Dion & Richard Marx: A Tribute to Luther Vandross
- Madonna - introduced Sting & Sean Paul
- Paulina Rubio, Hilary Duff & Brian McKnight - presented Best Female Pop Vocal Performance
- Sarah Jessica Parker - introduced Justin Timberlake and Arturo Sandoval
- Ellen Degeneres - presented the Presidents Award to The Beatles
- Queen Latifah - introduced the Black Eyed Peas
- Joshua Bell & Keith Urban - paid tribute to Van Cliburn and Doc Watson, Lifetime Achievement Award recipients and presented Best Female Country Vocal Performance
- Cuba Gooding Jr. - paid tribute to Ella Jenkins, a recipient of the Lifetime Achievement Award and introduced Beyoncé
- Sean Astin & Norah Jones - paid tribute to Artie Shaw and Marian McPartland, Lifetime Achievement and Trustee Award recipients and presented Best New Artist
- Samuel L Jackson - introduced the Funk Music Tribute
- Snoop Dogg & Jason Alexander - introduced the Foo Fighters and Chick Corea
- Michael McDonald & Mary J. Blige - paid tribute to The Neptunes as the Producer of the Year (Non Classical) and presented Record of the Year
- Missy Elliott & Tony Bennett - introduced Sarah McLachlan and Alison Krauss
- Sharon Osbourne & Ozzy Osbourne - presented Best Rock Performance by a Duo or Group with Vocals
- Mort Sahl (first Grammys host) - paid tribute to Pierre Cossette (first Grammy telecast producer)
- Babyface, Carole King & Kurt Elling - paid tribute to Orrin Keepnews, a Trustees Award recipient and presented Song of the Year
- Carlos Santana & Faith Hill - paid tribute to Sonny Rollins, a Lifetime Achievement recipient Award and presented Album of the Year

== Winners and nominees ==
Bold type indicates the winner out of the list of nominees.

Reference for the nominations:

=== General ===
Record of the Year

- **"Clocks" – Coldplay**
  - **Coldplay & Ken Nelson, producers; Coldplay, Ken Nelson & Mark Phythian, engineers/mixers**
- "Crazy In Love" – Beyoncé featuring Jay-Z
  - Rich Harrison & Beyoncé Knowles, producers; Jim Caruana & Tony Maserati, engineers/mixers
- "Where Is the Love?" – The Black Eyed Peas & Justin Timberlake
  - Ron Fair & will.i.am, producers; Dylan Dresdow & Tony Maserati, engineers/mixers
- "Lose Yourself" – Eminem
  - Eminem, producer; Eminem, Steve King & Micheal Strange, Jr., engineers/mixers
- "Hey Ya!" – OutKast
  - André 3000, producer; Kevin "KD" Davis, John Frye, Robert Hannon, Pete Novak & Neal Pogue, engineers/mixers

Album of the Year

- **Speakerboxxx/The Love Below – OutKast**
  - **André "3000" Benjamin, Antwon "Big Boi" Patton & Carl Mo, producers; Vincent Alexander, Chris Carmouche, Kevin "KD" Davis, Reggie Dozier, John Frye, Robert Hannon, Padraic Kernin, Moka Nagatani, Pete Novak, Brian Paturalski, Neal Pogue, Dexter Simmons, Matt Still & Darrell Thorp, engineers/mixers; Brian Gardner & Bernie Grundman, mastering engineers**
- Under Construction – Missy Elliott
  - Craig Brockman, Missy "Misdemeanor" Elliott, Erroll "Poppi" McCalla, Nisan & Timbaland, producers; Jeff Allen, Carlos "El Loco" Bedoya, Josh Butler, Senator Jimmy D, Guru, Timbaland & Mike Wilson, engineers/mixers; Herb Powers, mastering engineer
- Fallen – Evanescence
  - Dave Fortman & Ben Moody, producers; Jay Baumgardner, Dave Fortman & Jeremy Parker, engineers/mixers; Ted Jensen, mastering engineer
- Justified – Justin Timberlake
  - Brian McKnight, The Neptunes, Scott Storch, Timbaland & The Underdogs, producers; Andrew Coleman, Jimmy Douglass, Serban Ghenea, Dabling Harward, Steve Penny, Dave "Hard Drive" Pensado, Dave "Natural Love" Russell, Timbaland & Chris Wood, engineers/mixers; Herb Powers Jr., mastering engineer
- Elephant – The White Stripes
  - Jack White, producer; Liam Watson & Jack White, engineers/mixers; Noel Summerville, mastering engineer

Song of the Year

- **"Dance With My Father"**
  - **Richard Marx & Luther Vandross, songwriters (Luther Vandross)**
- "Beautiful"
  - Linda Perry, songwriter (Christina Aguilera)
- "I'm With You"
  - Avril Lavigne & The Matrix, songwriters (Avril Lavigne)
- "Keep Me In Your Heart"
  - Jorge Calderón & Warren Zevon, songwriters (Warren Zevon)
- "Lose Yourself"
  - J. Bass, M. Mathers & L. Resto, songwriters (Eminem)

Best New Artist

- **Evanescence**
- 50 Cent
- Fountains of Wayne
- Heather Headley
- Sean Paul

=== Alternative ===
Best Alternative Music Album

- **Elephant – The White Stripes**
- Fight Test – The Flaming Lips
- Hail to the Thief – Radiohead
- Untitled – Sigur Rós
- Fever to Tell – Yeah Yeah Yeahs

=== Blues ===
Best Traditional Blues Album

- Jacquire King (engineer), Ed Cherney (engineer/mixer), Dennis Herring (producer) & Buddy Guy for Blues Singer

Best Contemporary Blues Album

- Donto James (engineer/producer), Josh Sklair (producer), Sametto James (producer) & Etta James for Let's Roll

=== Children's ===
- Best Musical Album for Children
  - Cathy Fink & Marcy Marxer for Bon Appétit!
- Best Spoken Word Album for Children
  - Bill Clinton, Mikhail Gorbachev & Sophia Loren for Wolf Tracks and Peter and the Wolf, music performed by the Russian National Orchestra conducted by Kent Nagano

=== Classical ===
- Best Orchestral Performance
  - Pierre Boulez (conductor) & the Vienna Philharmonic for Mahler: Symphony No. 3 performed by Anne Sofie von Otter, Johannes Prinz, Gerald Wirth, the Vienna Boys' Choir & the Women's Chorus of the Vienna Singverein
- Best Classical Vocal Performance
  - Thomas Quasthoff & Anne Sofie von Otter for Schubert: Lieder with Orchestra performed by Thomas Quasthoff, Anne Sofie von Otter & the Chamber Orchestra of Europe conducted by Claudio Abbado
- Best Opera Recording
  - Wolfram Graul (producer), Bernard Haitink (conductor), Jerry Hadley, Karita Mattila, Eva Randová, Anja Silja, Jorma Silvasti for Janáček's: Jenůfa performed by the Orchestra of the Royal Opera House & Chorus & various artists
- Best Choral Performance
  - Paavo Järvi (conductor), Tiia-Ester Loitme & Ants Soots (chorus masters) for Sibelius: Cantatas performed by the Ellerhein Girls' Choir, the Estonian National Male Choir & the Estonian National Symphony Orchestra
- Best Instrumental Soloist(s) Performance (with orchestra)
  - Mstislav Rostropovich (conductor) & Maxim Vengerov for Britten: Violin Concerto/Walton: Viola Concerto performed by Maxim Vengerov & the London Symphony Orchestra
- Best Instrumental Soloist Performance (without orchestra)
  - Emanuel Ax for Haydn: Piano Sonatas Nos. 29, 31, 34, 35 & 49
- Best Small Ensemble Performance (with or without conductor)
  - Jeff von der Schmidt (conductor) & Southwest Chamber Music for "Chávez: Suite for Double Quartet"
- Best Chamber Music Performance
  - The Kronos Quartet & Dawn Upshaw for Berg: Lyric Suite
- Best Classical Contemporary Composition
  - Dominick Argento (composer) for "Argento: Casa Guidi" performed by Frederica von Stade, Eiji Oue & the Minnesota Orchestra
- Best Classical Album
  - Andreas Neubronner (producer), Michael Tilson Thomas (conductor) & Michelle DeYoung for Mahler: Symphony No. 3; Kindertotenlieder performed by Michelle DeYoung, Vance George, the Pacific Boychoir, the San Francisco Girls Chorus & the San Francisco Symphony & Chorus
- Best Classical Crossover Album
  - Jorge Calandrelli (conductor) & Yo-Yo Ma for Obrigado Brazil performed by various artists

=== Comedy ===
Best Comedy Album

- "Weird Al" Yankovic for Poodle Hat

=== Composing and arranging ===
Best Instrumental Composition

- Wayne Shorter (composer) for "Sacajawea"

Best Instrumental Arrangement

- Michael Brecker & Gil Goldstein (arrangers) for "Timbuktu" performed by the Michael Brecker Quindectet

Best Instrumental Arrangement Accompanying Vocalist(s)

- Vince Mendoza (arranger) for "Woodstock" (Joni Mitchell)

=== Country ===
Best Female Country Vocal Performance

- June Carter Cash for "Keep on the Sunny Side"

Best Male Country Vocal Performance

- Vince Gill for "Next Big Thing"

Best Country Performance by a Duo or Group with Vocal

- Ricky Skaggs & Kentucky Thunder for "A Simple Life"

Best Country Collaboration with Vocals

- James Taylor & Alison Krauss for "How's the World Treating You"

Best Country Instrumental Performance

- Alison Krauss & Union Station for "Cluck Old Hen"

Best Country Song

- Jim Moose Brown & Don Rollins (songwriters) for "It's Five O'Clock Somewhere" performed by Alan Jackson & Jimmy Buffett

Best Country Album

- Carl Jackson (producer) for Livin', Lovin', Losin' – Songs of the Louvin Brothers performed by various artists

Best Bluegrass Album

- Alison Krauss & Union Station for Live

=== Dance ===
Best Dance Recording

- Rob Davis, Cathy Dennis (producers), Rob Davis, Cathy Dennis, Bruce Elliott-Smith, Phil Larsen (mixers) & Kylie Minogue for "Come Into My World"

=== Film/TV/media ===
Best Compilation Soundtrack Album for a Motion Picture, Television or Other Visual Media

- Randy Spendlove & Ric Wake (compilation producers) & Various Artists for Chicago: Music from the Miramax Motion Picture

Best Score Soundtrack Album for a Motion Picture, Television or Other Visual Media

- John J. Kurlander (engineer), Peter Cobbin (engineer/mixer) & Howard Shore (composer) for The Lord of the Rings: The Two Towers: Original Motion Picture Soundtrack

Best Song Written for a Motion Picture, Television or Other Visual Media

- Christopher Guest, Eugene Levy & Michael McKean (songwriters) for "A Mighty Wind" performed by The Folksmen, Mitch & Mickey & The New Main Street Singers

=== Folk ===
Best Traditional Folk Album

- Wildwood Flower – June Carter Cash

Best Contemporary Folk Album

- The Wind – Warren Zevon

Best Native American Music Album

- Flying Free – Black Eagle

=== Gospel ===
Best Pop/Contemporary Gospel Album

- Michael W. Smith for Worship Again

Best Rock Gospel Album

- Audio Adrenaline for Worldwide

Best Traditional Soul Gospel Album

- The Blind Boys of Alabama for Go Tell It on the Mountain

Best Contemporary Soul Gospel Album

- Donnie McClurkin for ...Again

Best Southern, Country or Bluegrass Gospel Album

- Rise and Shine – Randy Travis

Best Gospel Choir or Chorus Album

- Bishop T.D. Jakes (choir director) & the Potter's House Mass Choir for A Wing and a Prayer

=== Historical ===
Best Historical Album

- Steve Berkowitz, Alex Gibney, Andy McKaie, Jerry Rappaport (producers), Gavin Lurssen & Joseph M. Palmaccio (engineers) for Martin Scorsese Presents the Blues: A Musical Journey performed by various artists

=== Jazz ===
Best Jazz Instrumental Solo

- "Matrix" – Chick Corea in Rendezvous in New York

Best Jazz Instrumental Album, Individual or Group

- Clark Germain (engineer), Dave Darlington (engineer/mixer), Robert Sadin (engineer/mixer & producer) & Wayne Shorter for Alegría

Best Large Jazz Ensemble Album

- Jay Newland (engineer/mixer), Gil Goldstein, Michael Brecker (producers) & the Michael Brecker Quindectet for Wide Angles

Best Jazz Vocal Album

- Michael O'Reilly (engineer), Arif Mardin (producer) & Dianne Reeves for A Little Moonlight

Best Contemporary Jazz Album

- George Whitty (engineer/mixer & producer) & Randy Brecker (producers & artist) for 34th N Lex

Best Latin Jazz Album

- Robert J. Friedrich (engineer/mixer), Michel Camilo (producer & artist), Charles Flores & Horacio "El Negro" Hernandez for Live at the Blue Note

=== Latin ===
Best Latin Pop Album

- Mick Guzauski (engineer/mixer), Lulo Perez (producer) & Alejandro Sanz (producer & artist) for No Es Lo Mismo

Best Traditional Tropical Latin Album

- Jerry Boys (engineer/mixer), Ry Cooder (producer) & Ibrahim Ferrer for Buenos Hermanos

Best Mexican/Mexican-American Album

- Jose Angel Cabrera & Dennis Parker (engineers), Daniel Estevez T. (engineer/mixer) & Joan Sebastian (producer & artist) for Afortunado

Best Latin Rock/Alternative Album

- Anibal Kerpel, Joseph Chiccarelli (engineers), Elfego Buendia, Emmanuel Del Real, Gustavo Santaolalla, Jose "Joselo" Rangel, Quique Rangel (producers) & Café Tacuba for Cuatro Caminos

Best Tejano Album

- Edward Perez, Ramiro Serna (engineers), Jimmy Gonzalez producer & Jimmy Gonzalez y El Grupo Mazz for Si Me Faltas Tu

Best Salsa/Merengue Album

- Jon Fausty, Luca Germini, Jorge G. Gómez, Carlos Laurenz, Jose Lopez, Olga Santos, Jake Tanner, (engineers), Jorge G. Garcia (engineer/mixer), Oscar Gómez (engineer/mixer & producer), Sergio George (producer) & Celia Cruz for Regalo Del Alma

=== Musical show ===
Best Musical Show Album

- Todd Whitelock, Tom Lazarus (engineers), Ken Hahn (engineer/mixer) & Jay David Saks (engineer/mixer & producer) for Gypsy performed by the New Broadway cast with Bernadette Peters, Tammy Blanchard, John Dossett & others

=== Music video ===
Best Short Form Music Video

- Aris McGarry (video producer), Mark Romanek (video director) & Johnny Cash for "Hurt"

Best Long Form Music Video

- Michael Gochanour, Robin Klein & Mary Wharton (video producers) for "Legend" performed by Sam Cooke

=== New Age ===
Best New Age Album

- **One Quiet Night – Pat Metheny**
- Inner Journeys: Myths & Legends – Cusco
- Solace – Michael Hoppé
- Red Moon – Peter Kater
- Sacred Journey of Ku-Kai – Kitarō

=== Packaging and notes ===
Best Recording Package

- Ani DiFranco & Brian Grunert (art directors) for Evolve performed by Ani DiFranco

Best Boxed or Special Limited Edition Package

- Julian Alexander, Howard Fritzson & Seth Rothstein (art directors) for The Complete Jack Johnson Sessions performed by Miles Davis

Best Album Notes

- Tom Piazza (notes writer) for Martin Scorsese Presents the Blues: A Musical Journey performed by Various Artists

=== Polka ===
Best Polka Album

- Let's Polka 'Round – Jimmy Sturr

=== Pop ===
Best Female Pop Vocal Performance

- **"Beautiful" – Christina Aguilera**
- "Miss Independent" – Kelly Clarkson
- "White Flag" – Dido
- "I'm with You" – Avril Lavigne
- "Fallen" – Sarah McLachlan

Best Male Pop Vocal Performance

- **"Cry Me a River" – Justin Timberlake**
- "Any Road" – George Harrison
- "Ain't No Mountain High Enough" – Michael McDonald
- "Send Your Love" – Sting
- "Keep Me in Your Heart" – Warren Zevon

Best Pop Performance by a Duo or Group with Vocal

- **"Underneath It All" – No Doubt**
- "Misunderstood" – Bon Jovi
- "Hole in the World" – The Eagles
- "Stacy's Mom" – Fountains of Wayne
- "Unwell" – Matchbox 20

Best Pop Collaboration with Vocals

- **"Whenever I Say Your Name" – Sting & Mary J. Blige**
- "Can't Hold Us Down" – Christina Aguilera & Lil' Kim
- "La Vie En Rose" – Tony Bennett & k.d. lang
- "Gonna Change My Way Of Thinking" – Bob Dylan & Mavis Staples
- "Feel Good Time" – Pink & William Orbit

Best Pop Instrumental Performance

- **"Marwa Blues" – George Harrison**
- "Patricia" – Ry Cooder & Manuel Galbán
- "Honey-Dipped" – Dave Koz
- "Seabiscuit" – Randy Newman
- "The Nutcracker Suite" – The Brian Setzer Orchestra

Best Pop Vocal Album

- **Justified – Justin Timberlake**
- Stripped – Christina Aguilera
- Brainwashed – George Harrison
- Bare – Annie Lennox
- Motown – Michael McDonald

Best Pop Instrumental Album

- Mambo Sinuendo – Ry Cooder & Manuel Galbán

=== Production and engineering ===
Best Engineered Album, Non-Classical

- Nigel Godrich & Darrell Thorp (engineers) for Hail to the Thief performed by Radiohead

Best Engineered Album, Classical

- Richard King & Todd Whitelock (engineers) for Obrigado Brazil performed by Yo-Yo Ma

Best Remixed Recording, Non-Classical

- Maurice Joshua (remixer) for Crazy In Love (Maurice's Soul Mix) performed by Beyoncé & Jay-Z

Producer of the Year, Non-Classical

- The Neptunes

Producer of the Year, Classical

- Steven Epstein

=== R&B ===
Best Female R&B Vocal Performance

- Beyoncé for "Dangerously In Love 2"

Best Male R&B Vocal Performance

- Luther Vandross for "Dance with My Father"

Best R&B Performance by a Duo or Group with Vocals

- Luther Vandross & Beyoncé for "The Closer I Get to You"

Best Traditional R&B Vocal Performance

- "Wonderful" – Aretha Franklin

Best Urban/Alternative Performance

- "Hey Ya!" – OutKast

Best R&B Song

- Shawn Carter, Rich Harrison, Beyoncé Knowles & Eugene Record for "Crazy in Love" performed by Beyoncé featuring Jay-Z

Best R&B Album

- Ray Bardani (engineer/mixer) & Luther Vandross (producer & artist) for Dance with My Father

Best Contemporary R&B Album

- Tony Maserati (engineer/mixer) & Beyoncé (producer & artist) for Dangerously in Love

=== Rap ===
Best Female Rap Solo Performance

- **"Work It" – Missy Elliott**
- "Got It Poppin" – Da Brat
- "Came Back For You" – Lil' Kim
- "Ride Wit' Me" – MC Lyte
- "Go Head" – Queen Latifah

Best Male Rap Solo Performance

- **"Lose Yourself" – Eminem**
- "Pump It Up" – Joe Budden
- "In Da Club" – 50 Cent
- "Stand Up" – Ludacris
- "Get Busy" – Sean Paul

Best Rap Performance by a Duo or Group

- **"Shake Ya Tailfeather" – Nelly, P. Diddy & Murphy Lee**
- "Gossip Folks" – Missy Elliott featuring Ludacris
- "Magic Stick" – Lil' Kim featuring 50 Cent
- "Dipset (Santana's Town)" – Juelz Santana featuring Cam'ron
- "Can't Stop, Won't Stop" – Young Gunz

Best Rap/Sung Collaboration

- **"Crazy in Love" – Beyoncé featuring Jay-Z**
- "Where Is The Love?" – The Black Eyed Peas with Justin Timberlake
- "Luv U Better" – LL Cool J featuring Marc Dorsey
- "Frontin' – The Neptunes featuring Pharrell Williams & Jay-Z
- "Beautiful" – Snoop Dogg featuring Pharrell & Uncle Charlie Wilson

Best Rap Song

- **"Lose Yourself"**
  - **J. Bass, M. Mathers & L. Resto, songwriters (Eminem)**
- "Beautiful"
  - Calvin Broadus, Chad Hugo & Pharrell Williams, songwriters (Snoop Dogg featuring Pharrell & Uncle Charlie Wilson)
- "Excuse Me Miss"
  - Shawn Carter, Chad Hugo & Pharrell Williams, songwriters (Jay-Z featuring Pharrell Williams)
- "In Da Club"
  - M. Elizondo, C. Jackson & A. Young, songwriters (50 Cent)
- "Work It"
  - Missy Elliott & Tim Mosley, songwriters (Missy Elliott)

Best Rap Album

- **Speakerboxxx/The Love Below – OutKast**
- Under Construction – Missy Elliott
- Get Rich Or Die Tryin' – 50 Cent
- The Blueprint²: The Gift & The Curse – Jay-Z
- Phrenology – The Roots

=== Reggae ===
Best Reggae Album

- **Dutty Rock – Sean Paul**
- Friends for Life – Buju Banton
- Free Man – Burning Spear
- Ain't Givin' Up – Third World
- No Holding Back – Wayne Wonder

=== Rock ===
Best Female Rock Vocal Performance

- **"Trouble" – P!nk**
- "Are You Happy Now?" – Michelle Branch
- "Losing Grip" – Avril Lavigne
- "Time of Our Lives" – Bonnie Raitt
- "Righteously" – Lucinda Williams

Best Male Rock Vocal Performance

- **"Gravedigger" – Dave Matthews**
- "New Killer Star" – David Bowie
- "Down in the Flood" – Bob Dylan
- "If I Could Fall in Love" – Lenny Kravitz
- "Return of Jackie and Judy" – Tom Waits

Best Rock Performance by a Duo or Group with Vocal

- **"Disorder in the House" – Bruce Springsteen & Warren Zevon**
- "Times Like These" – Foo Fighters
- "There There" – Radiohead
- "Seven Nation Army" – The White Stripes
- "Calling All Angels" – Train

Best Rock Instrumental Performance

- Plan B – Jeff Beck

Best Hard Rock Performance

- "Bring Me to Life" – Evanescence featuring Paul McCoy

Best Metal Performance

- **"St. Anger" – Metallica**
- "Did My Time" – Korn
- "Mobscene" – Marilyn Manson
- "Smothered" – Spineshank
- "Inhale" – Stone Sour

Best Rock Song

- Jack White (songwriter) for "Seven Nation Army" performed by The White Stripes

Best Rock Album

- Jim Scott (engineer/mixer), David Grohl, Taylor Hawkins, Nate Mendel, Chris Shiflett, Nick Raskulinecz (producers) & Foo Fighters for One by One

=== Spoken ===
Best Spoken Word Album

- Paul Ruben (producer) & Al Franken for Lies and the Lying Liars Who Tell Them: A Fair and Balanced Look at the Right

=== Traditional pop ===
Best Traditional Pop Vocal Album

- **A Wonderful World – Tony Bennett & k.d lang**
  - Dae Bennett (engineer/mixer), T Bone Burnett (producer),

=== World ===
Best Traditional World Music Album

- Jon Mark (engineer & producer) & the monks of Sherab Ling Monastery for Sacred Tibetan Chant

Best Contemporary World Music Album

- Stéphane Caisson (engineer), José da Silva (producer) & Cesária Évora for Voz d'Amor

== In Memoriam ==
- Bobby Hatfield
- Michael Kamen
- Little Eva
- Hank Ballard
- Edwin Starr
- Nina Simone
- Barry White
- Tony Thompson
- Herbie Mann
- Benny Carter
- Luther Henderson
- Billy May
- John Guerin
- Buddy Arnold
- Bebu Silvetti
- Babatunde Olatunji
- Bob Keane
- Johnny Cash
- June Carter Cash
- Don Gibson
- Johnny Paycheck
- Sam Phillips
- Felice and Boudleaux Bryant
- Max D. Barnes
- Sheb Wooley
- Eugene Istomin
- Rosalyn Tureck
- Luciano Berio
- Lou Harrison
- Celia Cruz
- Rubén González
- Compay Segundo
- Mickie Most
- Elliott Smith
- Noel Redding
- Robert Palmer
- Warren Zevon

== Special merit awards ==
=== Grammy Hall of Fame Award ===
- "All I Have to Do Is Dream" (Cadence, 1958) performed by The Everly Brothers
- "Aquarius/Let The Sunshine In (The Flesh Failures)" (Soul City, 1969) performed by The 5th Dimension
- "Bohemian Rhapsody" (Elektra, 1976) performed by Queen
- "By the Time I Get to Phoenix" (Capitol, 1967) performed by Glen Campbell
- Chopin: The Complete Nocturnes (RCA Red Seal, 1965) performed by Arthur Rubinstein
- Come Fly With Me (Capitol, 1958) performed by Frank Sinatra
- Court and Spark (Asylum, 1974) performed by Joni Mitchell
- Ellington at Newport (Columbia, 1957) performed by Duke Ellington & His Orchestra
- "Every Day I Have the Blues" (RPM, 1955) performed by B.B. King
- Funny Girl (Capitol, 1964) performed by the original Broadway cast with Barbra Streisand & Sydney Chaplin
- Golden Jubilee Concert: Rachmaninoff Concerto no. 3 (RCA Red Seal, 1978) performed by Vladimir Horowitz with Eugene Ormandy conducting the New York Philharmonic Orchestra
- "He's a Rebel" (Philles, 1962) performed by The Crystals
- "Holiday for Strings" (RCA Victor, 1943) David Rose & His Orchestra
- "I've Got the World on a String" (Capitol, 1953) performed by Frank Sinatra
- Johnny Cash at San Quentin (Columbia, 1969) performed by Johnny Cash
- "Just the Way You Are" (Columbia, 1978) performed by Billy Joel
- "Last Date" (RCA, 1960) performed by Floyd Cramer
- Led Zeppelin (Atlantic, 1969) performed by Led Zeppelin
- "Let It Be" (Apple, 1970) performed by The Beatles
- Let's Get It On (Tamla, 1973) performed by Marvin Gaye
- "Love Is Strange" (Groove/ RCA, 1957) performed by Mickey & Sylvia
- Milestones (Columbia, 1958) performed by the Miles Davis Sextet
- "Night and Day" (RCA Victor, 1932) performed by Leo Reisman & His Orchestra with Fred Astaire
- "A Night In Tunisia" (Victor, 1946) performed by Dizzy Gillespie & His Sextet
- "Pennies From Heaven" (Decca, 1936) performed by Bing Crosby
- "Rock-A-Bye Your Baby With a Dixie Melody" (Columbia, 1918) performed by Al Jolson
- Saturday Night Fever (RSO, 1977) performed by the motion picture cast
- "See See Rider Blues" (Paramount, 1925) performed by Ma Rainey
- "The Sound of Silence" (Columbia, 1965) performed by Simon & Garfunkel
- That's the Way of the World (Columbia, 1975) performed by Earth, Wind & Fire
- Walt Disney's Fantasia (Buena Vista, 1956) performed by the Philadelphia Orchestra conducted by Leopold Stokowski
- West Side Story (Columbia, 1961) performed by the motion picture cast
- "You're So Vain" (Elektra, 1973) performed by Carly Simon

=== MusiCares Person of the Year ===
- Sting

=== Technical Grammy Award ===
- Douglas Sax
- Solid State Logic

=== Grammy Trustees Award ===
- Gerry Goffin and Carole King
- Orrin Keepnews
- Marian McPartland

=== Lifetime Achievement Award ===
- Van Cliburn
- The Funk Brothers
- Ella Jenkins
- Sonny Rollins
- Artie Shaw
- Doc Watson

== Trivia ==
- OutKast's Speakerboxxx/The Love Below became the first and only rap album to date to win Album of the Year. It was also the second hip-hop album to win Album of the Year, following Lauryn Hill's R&B album, The Miseducation of Lauryn Hill (1998).
- Beyoncé became the fourth female artist to win a record five awards in one night. Prior to Beyoncé, Norah Jones, Alicia Keys and Lauryn Hill had won five in one night. Since 2004 Amy Winehouse and Alison Krauss became the fifth and sixth artists respectively to tie this record. Beyoncé was the only one of these six artists to not win a general field award out of her five wins. In the 2010 ceremony, Beyoncé broke both of these records, earning six awards and winning Song of the Year, a general field award, for her song ”Single Ladies (Put A Ring On It)”. This record was later tied by British singer Adele in 2012.
- Justin Timberlake apologized for the Super Bowl halftime show the past week in his acceptance speech that night. However, Janet Jackson does not appear at the event.
- As Evanescence were presented with the award for Best New Artist, rapper 50 Cent went up to the stage. 50 Cent was nominated for Best New Artist, losing to Evanescence.
- Luther Vandross won four awards however he was unable to attend due to a stroke he suffered several months earlier. Celine Dion sang his song "Dance With My Father" with Richard Marx playing piano in tribute to Vandross. The song was awarded the award for Song of the Year later that night. During the show they showed a videotaped clip that was pre-taped of him saying "Whenever I say goodbye it's never for long because I believe in the power of love". Vandross died the following year in 2005.
- Warren Zevon who died in September 2003 was awarded two posthumous awards: Best Contemporary Folk Album for The Wind and Best Rock Performance by a Duo or Group with Vocal for his duet with Bruce Springsteen, "Disorder in the House".
- The show also featured a tribute to The Beatles in honor of the 40th anniversary of their arrival in America and their appearance on The Ed Sullivan Show. During the show, both widows of deceased members – Yoko Ono and Olivia Harrison – made an on-stage appearance.
