= Ottmar Liebert =

German guitarist

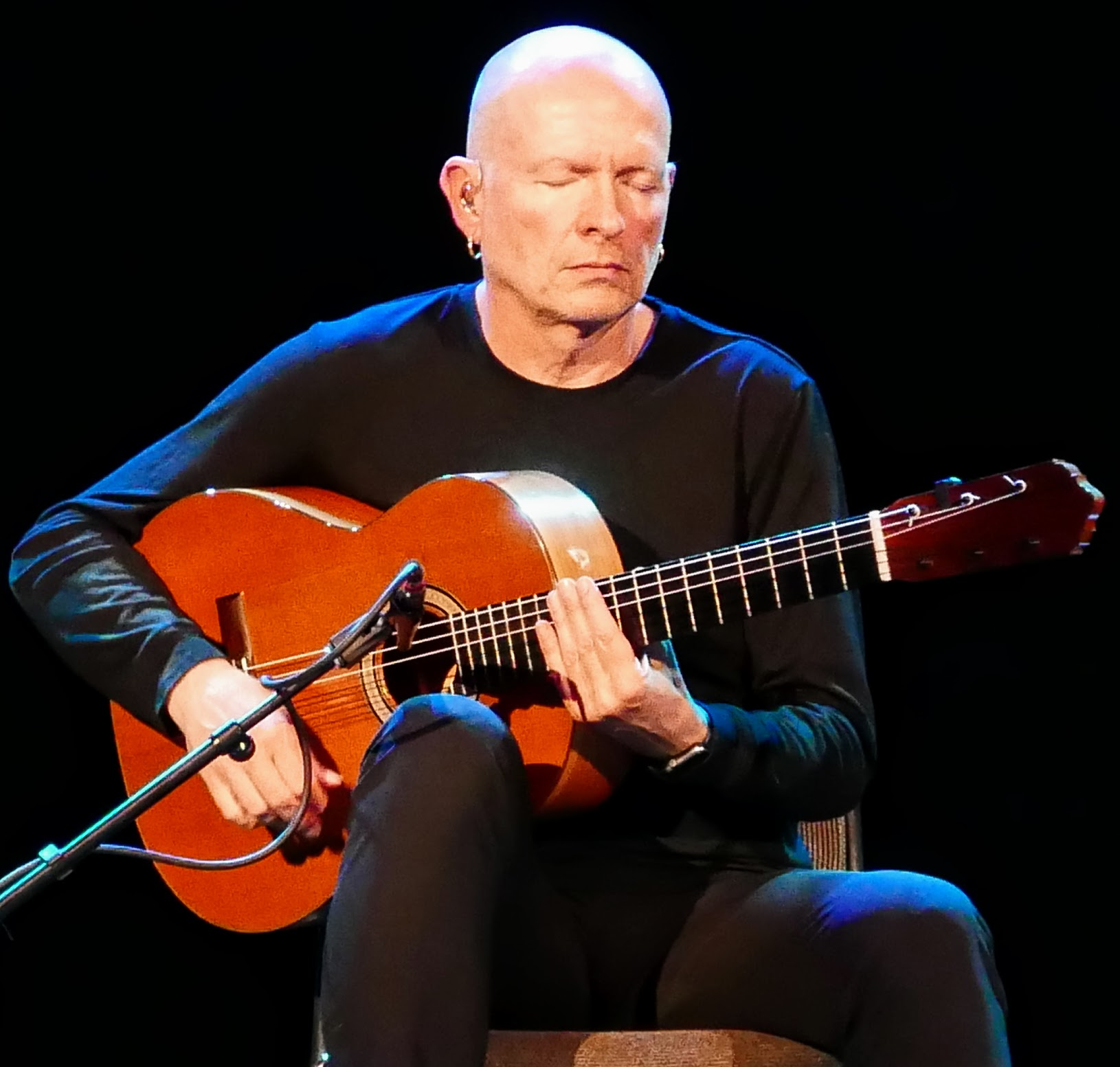
- Liebert in 2018

Background information
- Born: 1 February 1959 (age 67); Cologne, West Germany
- Genres: New-age; smooth jazz; classical; flamenco
- Occupation: Musician
- Instrument: Guitar
- Years active: 1989–present
- Labels: Higher Octave; Epic; Sony; 33rd Street
- Website: www.ottmarliebert.com

Ottmar Liebert (born 1 February 1959) is a German guitarist, songwriter and producer best known for his Spanish-influenced music. A five-time Grammy Award nominee, Liebert has received 38 Gold and Platinum certifications in the United States, as well as certifications in Canada, Australia and New Zealand. His debut album Nouveau Flamenco (1990) was certified Platinum in the United States.

== Early life ==
Ottmar Liebert was born 1 February 1959 in Cologne, West Germany, to a Chinese-German father and a Hungarian mother. As a child, he spent most of his time travelling throughout Europe and Asia with his family. He began playing classical guitar at 11, and studying flamenco guitar at 14, after he "found a Flamenco LP in the bargain bin at a local supermarket." After performing rock music in his native Germany, he moved to the United States and settled in Boston for a few years, performing in various rock clubs. In 1986 Liebert settled in Santa Fe, New Mexico, where he began looking to create a new musical sound.

Liebert cites musical influences such as "Carlos Santana, Paco de Lucía, John McLaughlin, Robert Fripp and Jeff Beck, others were horn players like Miles Davis," although he cites "others yet were fine artists who taught me about space and brush strokes and dynamics and contrast."

== Music career ==
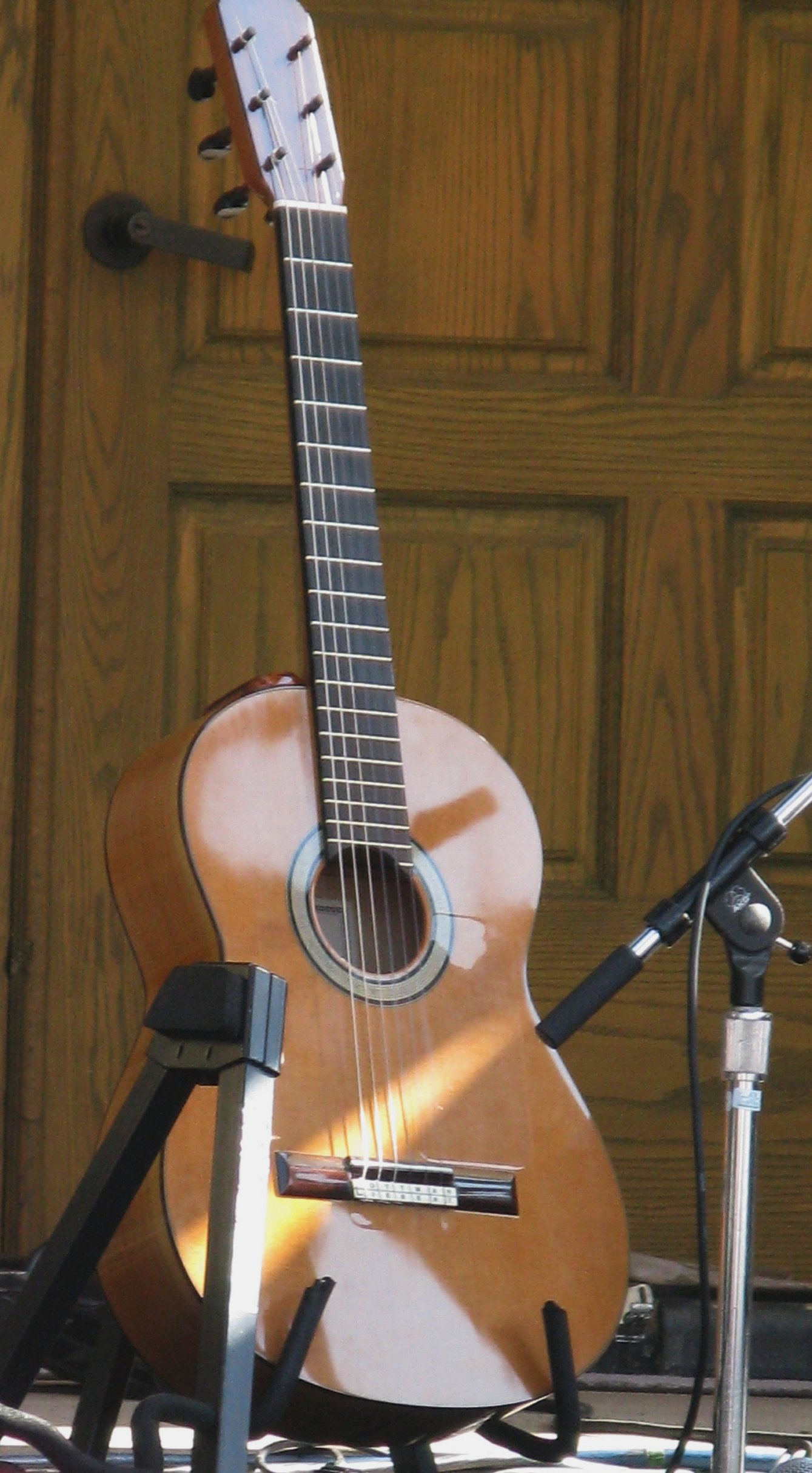
A Lester DeVoe owned by Ottmar Liebert

In 1988, Liebert founded the first incarnation of his band Luna Negra (black moon). That year he recorded a self-produced album titled Marita: Shadows and Storms. The initial thousand copies were sold in the gallery of Santa Fe artist Frank Howell. When the record found its way to radio stations and began generating a response among listeners, Higher Octave Music picked it up and released a remastered version titled Nouveau Flamenco (1990). The album eventually sold double-platinum in the United States.

Liebert followed up his debut with several successful albums that continued and expanded his sound, including Borrasca (1991), Solo Para Ti (1992) and The Hours Between Night + Day (1993), all three earning Gold certification. Liebert's international success continued with ¡Viva! (1995) and Opium (1996), both of which earned Platinum status in the United States and Latin America.

Liebert has recorded with Luna Negra since 1989. Personnel in the band have changed regularly since then, with the only constant being bassist Jon Gagan.

Since 1990, Ottmar Liebert has released a total of 25 albums including live releases, Christmas CDs, 15 CDs of original music, a DVD, and various remixes. He has received 38 Gold and Platinum certifications in the US as well as certifications in Canada, Australia, and New Zealand.

In 2006, Liebert contributed his song "This Spring Release 10,000 Butterflies" to the album project Artists for Charity - Guitarists 4 the Kids, produced by Slang Productions, to assist World Vision Canada in helping underprivileged kids in need.

== Nouveau Flamenco ==
Liebert describes his musical style as "Nouveau Flamenco." In a 2004 interview, Liebert explained that once he was signed to a record label, he was required to come up with a name for what he was doing. Although there are flamenco elements to his music, it's nothing like traditional flamenco, being based on melody and using much simpler forms. As this music couldn't be considered jazz, rock, or classical, he felt that flamenco was the closest word to use that people could identify with.

Liebert drew some criticism with his adoption of the term, especially since according to critics, none of his works to date followed traditional flamenco palo forms. It was also perceived by some as a marketing ploy and an attempt to associate his music with the then burgeoning school of "Flamenco Nuevo", where acknowledged flamenco artists had started to rejuvenate and reinvent flamenco through the introduction of influences from Latin America (e.g. the Rumba rhythm) and even jazz music. Paco de Lucia was one such critic. Despite Liebert's citing Paco as an influence, Paco described Liebert's music as "una degeneración, una caricatura del flamenco" (literally, "a degeneration, a caricature"). However, Paco later seemed to appreciate Liebert's music, with Paco's record company even mentioning him in promotional materials.

== Personal life ==
Since 1986 Liebert has lived in Santa Fe, New Mexico. In May 2006 Liebert was ordained as a Zen monk by Dennis Genpo Merzel at the Kanzeon Zen Center in Salt Lake City, Utah.

== Awards ==
- Nouveau Flamenco (1990) Certified: Platinum – US, 14 x Platinum – US/Latin, Platinum – Australia, Platinum – New Zealand, Gold – Canada, Gold – Mexico
- Poets & Angels: Music 4 the Holidays (1990) Certified: 2 x Platinum – US/Latin
- Borrasca (1991) Certified: Gold – US, 4 x Platinum – US/Latin
- Solo Para Ti (1992) Certified: Gold – US, 2 x Platinum – US/Latin, Gold – Canada
- The Hours Between Night + Day (1993) Certified: Gold – US, 2 x Platinum – US/Latin, Gold – Canada, Gold – New Zealand
- Euphoria (1995) Certified: Gold – US/Latin
- ¡Viva! (1995) Certified: Platinum – US/Latin
- Opium (1996) Certified: Platinum – US/Latin
- Leaning Into the Night (Inclinado en la Noche) (1997) Certified: Gold – US/Latin
- Innamorare: Summer Flamenco (1999) Certified: Gold – US/Latin
- Nouveau Flamenco: 1990–2000 Special Tenth Anniversary Edition (2000) Certified: Platinum – US/Latin

== Discography ==
=== Studio albums ===
Year	Album	Certification	Charts, awards and nominations
1989	Marita: Shadows & Storms		
1990	Nouveau Flamenco	Platinum - US; 14× Platinum - US Latin; Platinum - New Zealand; Gold - Canada; Gold - Mexico	AUS No. 74
1990	Poets & Angels: Music 4 the Holidays: No. / Title / Length; 1. / "Deck the Halls" / 3:09; 2. / "Angels We Have Heard On High/High on Hope" / 4:05; 3. / "Poets & Angels" / 3:13; 4. / "Little Drummer Boy/Luna Negra Beat" / 4:30; 5. / "1st Nowell" / 5:04; 6. / "Shepherd's Nite Watch" / 3:04; 7. / "Away in a Manger/Island X'mas (4 Bok Yun)" / 3:40; 8. / "Festival (Of 7 Lights)" / 2:52; 9. / "Jingle Bells" / 3:41; 10. / "O X'mas Tree (4 Anna + Barthelomaus)" / 2:07; 11. / "Starry Nite (March Of Kings)" / 4:52; 12. / "Morning Glory" / 2:29; 13. / "Silent Nite" / 3:08; 14. / "We 3 Kings (Of Orient R)/Santa Fe X'mas" / 3:19; 15. / "O Holy Nite" / 4:57	2× Platinum - US Latin	
1991	Borrasca: No. / Title / Length; 1. / "Isla Del Sol" / 3:44; 2. / "August Moon" / 4:11; 3. / "In The Hands Of Love" / 4:43; 4. / "Dancing Under The Moon" / 4:38; 5. / "Twilight In Galisteo" / 5:03; 6. / "La Rosa Negra" / 4:25; 7. / "Borrasca" / 3:34; 8. / "Bullfighter's Dream" / 3:43; 9. / "Thru The Trees/Cloudless Sky" / 3:57; 10. / "La Aurora" / 4:08; 11. / "Driving 2 Madrid (B4 The Storm)" / 4:08; 12. / "The Storm Sings" / 3:59; 13. / "Night In Granada" / 3:52; 14. / "1st Rain/Cry Of Faith" / 4:32; 15. / "Bajo La Luna Mix" / 6:19	Gold - US; 4× Platinum - US Latin	nominated for a Grammy Award for Best New Age Album
1992	Solo Para Ti	Gold - US; 2× Platinum - US Latin; Gold - Canada	AUS No. 61
1993	The Hours Between Night + Day	Gold - US; 2× Platinum - US Latin; Gold - Canada; Gold - New Zealand	nominated for a Grammy Award for Best New Age Album: AUS No. 26
1995	Euphoria: No. / Title / Length; 1. / "Lush (La Calypso Mix/Edit)" / 4:53; 2. / "Havana Club (The Latin Mix)" / 5:19; 3. / "Lone Rider A" / 6:45; 4. / "Slip" / 4:36; 5. / "Havana Club (The Suspended Mix)" / 6:59; 6. / "Lone Rider B" / 6:04; 7. / "Lush (La Calypso Mix)" / 9:35	Gold - US Latin	
1995	¡Viva!	Platinum - US Latin	
1996	Opium	Platinum - US Latin	nominated for a Grammy Award for Best New Age Album: AUS No. 22
1997	Leaning Into the Night (Inclinado en la Noche)	Gold - US Latin	
1999	Innamorare: Summer Flamenco	Gold - US Latin	
2000	Nouveau Flamenco: 1990-2000 Special Tenth Anniversary Edition	Platinum - US Latin	
2000	Christmas + Santa Fe		
2001	Little Wing		
2002	In the Arms of Love: Lullabies 4 Children + Adults		
2003	The Santa Fe Sessions		
2003	3 is 4 Good Luck (Note: This limited edition mini-disc was only sold at 2003 shows and with Trilogy online (In the Arms of Love, The Santa Fe Sessions, Nouveaumatic).)		
2003	Euphoria: Nouveaumatic		
2004	La Semana		
2005	Winter Rose: Music Inspired by the Holidays		
2005	Tears in the Rain		
2006	One Guitar		nominated for a Grammy Award for Best New Age Album
2008	Up Close		
2008	The Scent of Light: No. / Title / Length; 1. / "Up Close: Beginning" / 6:40; 2. / "Streetlight (Marseille, August 1999)" / 7:41; 3. / "Silence: No More Longing (Utah, May 2005)" / 11:04; 4. / "Firelight (Granada, February 1992)" / 8:37; 5. / "Morning Light (Kham, October 2006)" / 5:12; 6. / "The River: Writing in Water (India, November 1978)" / 7:59; 7. / "Candlelight (Xiao Rem, February 2008)" / 9:37; 8. / "Three Days Without You" / 6:49; 9. / "Moonlight (Köln, April 2007)" / 5:11; 10. / "Up Close: Embrace" / 5:37		nominated for a Grammy Award for Best New Age Album
2010	Petals on the Path		
2011	Santa Fe		
2012	Dune		
2014	three-oh-five		
2015	Waiting n Swan		
2016	slow		
2018	The Complete Santa Fe Sessions: No. / Title / Length; 1. / "Borrasca" / 1:37; 2. / "Isla del Sol" / 3:57; 3. / "Barcelona Nights" / 4:37; 4. / "Reaching Out 2 U" / 5:42; 5. / "Havana Club" / 4:21; 6. / "Dancing Under the Moon" / 4:56; 7. / "Snakecharmer" / 7:17; 8. / "Sao Paulo" / 5:55; 9. / "Song 4 Pablo" / 4:07; 10. / "Turkish Night" / 5:50; 11. / "2 the Night" / 3:43; 12. / "La Rosa Negra" / 3:32; 13. / "Heart Still/Beating" / 5:12; 14. / "Santa Fe" / 3:32; 15. / "Morning Arrival in Goa" / 6:27		
2019	Fete		

=== Compilations ===
- Rumba Collection 1992–1997 (1998)
- Barcelona Nights: The Best of Ottmar Liebert Volume One (2001)
- Surrender 2 Love: The Best of Ottmar Liebert Volume Two (2001)
- The Best Of Ottmar Liebert (2002)
- Spanish Sun (2009)
- Bare Wood 2002-2012 (2014)

=== Singles ===
- "Havana Club" 12" 45-rpm (1995); Vinyl
- "Havana Club" (1997)
- "Spanish Steps" 12" 45-rpm (1999); Vinyl
- "Little Wing" - Radio Sampler (2001)

=== Featured performances ===
- Leap of Faith by Kenny Loggins (1991)
- Lonely Chaplin by Goody's (1992)
- Edith Piaf Tribute: My Legionaire (1993)
- Monsoon by Asiabeat (1994)
- Hemispheres by Dan Siegel (1995)
- Burning Whispers by Nestor Torres (1995)
- Take Me Higher by Diana Ross (1995)
- Falling into You by Celine Dion (1996)
- Voci e Chitarre by Lavezzimogol (1997)
- Leda Battisti by Leda Battisti (1998)
- Sundance Flamenco by James Bobchak (1999)
- Azul by Alan (1999)
- Soul Encounters/Encuentros del Alma by Chuscales (1999)
- Ancient Journeys by Cusco (2000)
- Transit by Jon Gagan (2004)
- Transit 2 by Jon Gagan (2006)
- Thira by Stephen Duros (2006)
- Tu, l'amore e il sesso by Leda Battisti (2007)
- The Art of Live Looping by Matthew Schoening (2008)
- Split Decision by Roy Rogers (2009)

=== Produced albums ===
- Soul Encounters/Encuentros Del Alma by Chuscales (1999)

=== Videos ===
- Wide-eyed + Dreaming – Live (1996), VHS and DVD

=== Other compilation appearances ===
- Guitar Music For Small Rooms (1997) (WEA)
- Gypsy Passion: New Flamenco (1997) (Narada)
- Obsession: New Flamenco Romance (1999) (Narada)
- Gypsy Fire (2000) (Narada)
- Guitar Music For Small Rooms 2 (2001) (WEA)
- Gypsy Spice: Best of New Flamenco (2009) (Baja Records)
- The World Of The Spanish Guitar Vol. 1 (2011) (Higher Octave Music)

== See also ==
- Johannes Linstead
- List of ambient music artists
