= Nouveau Flamenco (album) =

Studio album by Ottmar Liebert
- Released: May 7, 1990
- Recorded: 1989
- Genre: Flamenco; new-age
- Length: 50:05
- Label: Higher Octave
- Producer: Ottmar Liebert

Alternative covers
- 1990-2000 Special Tenth Anniversary Edition cover

Nouveau Flamenco is Ottmar Liebert's first album, released in May 1990, written in a subgenre of flamenco known as new flamenco, fusing pop music forms and call-response structure together with flamenco elements.

A digitally remastered edition entitled Nouveau Flamenco: 1990-2000 Special Tenth Anniversary Edition was released in 2000.

== Track listing ==
Original release
No.	Title	Length
1.	"Barcelona Nights"	4:02
2.	"Heart Still / Beating (4 Berlin)"	4:06
3.	"3 Women Walking"	4:21
4.	"2 the Night (Fast Cars / 4 Frank)"	4:19
5.	"Passing Storm"	3:54
6.	"Santa Fé"	4:17
7.	"Surrender 2 Love"	4:29
8.	"Waiting 4 Stars 2 Fall"	4:54
9.	"Road 2 Her / Home (Bulerías)"	4:14
10.	"After the Rain"	3:16
11.	"Flowers of Romance (4 Bok Yun)"	3:13
12.	"Moon Over Trees"	1:46
13.	"Shadows"	3:14

1990-2000 Special Tenth Anniversary Edition
No.	Title	Length
1.	"Surrender 2 Love"	4:41
2.	"Santa Fe"	4:18
3.	"Barcelona Nights"	4:03
4.	"Flowers of Romance"	3:25
5.	"3 Women Walking"	4:23
6.	"2 the Night"	4:29
7.	"Lonely Hours"	4:59
8.	"Road 2 Her / Home"	4:22
9.	"Passing Storm"	4:04
10.	"Surrender II"	2:04
11.	"After the Rain"	3:28
12.	"Heart Still / Beating"	4:09
13.	"Morning Sky"	3:33
14.	"Moon Over Trees"	2:12
15.	"Waiting 4 Stars 2 Fall"	4:54
16.	"La Memoria / Shadows"	3:30
17.	"Sudden Shadows"	4:21
18.	"Under Blue Moon"	2:45

== Production ==
- Produced By Ottmar Liebert & Randy Rand
- Engineered By Randy Rand & Tim Stroh
- Mastered By William Aura
- Executive Producer: Matt Marshall

== Personnel ==
- Ottmar Liebert: Guitars
- Stefan Liebert: Keyboards
- Jon Gagan: Bass
- Jeff Sussmann: Drums, Percussion

== Sales and certifications ==
Region	Certification	Certified units/sales
Canada (Music Canada)	Platinum	100,000^{^}
Singapore	—	50,000
United States (RIAA)	14× Platinum (Latin)	1,400,000^{^}
^{^} Shipments figures based on certification alone.

== See also ==
- List of best-selling Latin albums
