= A Choral Christmas =

Studio album by Cusco
- Released: 1995
- Genre: Cross-cultural new-age

Cusco chronology
Apurimac II (1994)	A Choral Christmas (1995)	Ring of the Dolphin (1996)

Professional ratings
Review scores
Source	Rating
Allmusic	3/5 stars

A Choral Christmas is an album by German cross-cultural new-age band Cusco. It was released in 1995.

The album was produced in collaboration with the Munich Opera Choir. The tracks feature a fusion of slow vocal melodies with music of the late Middle Ages and Renaissance, and instrumentally recall elements of their earlier album Concierto de Aranjuez(1986). Unlike any other Cusco album, the choirs are predominant in most tracks. The exceptions being the instrumental "Canon" and "Swan Lake / The Nutcracker". This album was also released on the Prudence label under the title A Cusco Christmas.

== Track listing ==
1. "There Comes A Vessel Laden / In Dulci Jubilo"
2. "Silent Night"
3. "Jesus Stays My Joy"
4. "Lo, How A Rose"
5. "Canon"
6. "From Heaven Above"
7. "Christ The Lord Is Born Today"
8. "Swan Lake / The Nutcracker"
9. "Soon It Will Be Night"
10. "Shepherd's Christmas Symphonia"

== Album credits ==
- Matt Marshall – Executive producer
- Kristian Schultze – Arranger, programming, choir master
- Dan Selene – Executive producer
- Joseph L. Steiner III – Digital mastering
- Murry Whiteman – Art direction, design
- Maria Ehrenreich – Project coordinator
- Koji Yamashita – Photography
- Johannes Walter – Photography
- Michael Holm – Arranger, voices, producer, mixing
- William Aura – Digital mastering
- Cusco – Main performer
