= Water Stories =

Water Stories may refer to:

- Water Stories (Cusco album), 1990
- Water Stories (Ketil Bjørnstad album), 1993
