= Lester DeVoe =

American luthier

- Born: 1951 (age 74–75)
- Occupation: Luthier
- Years active: 1975-present

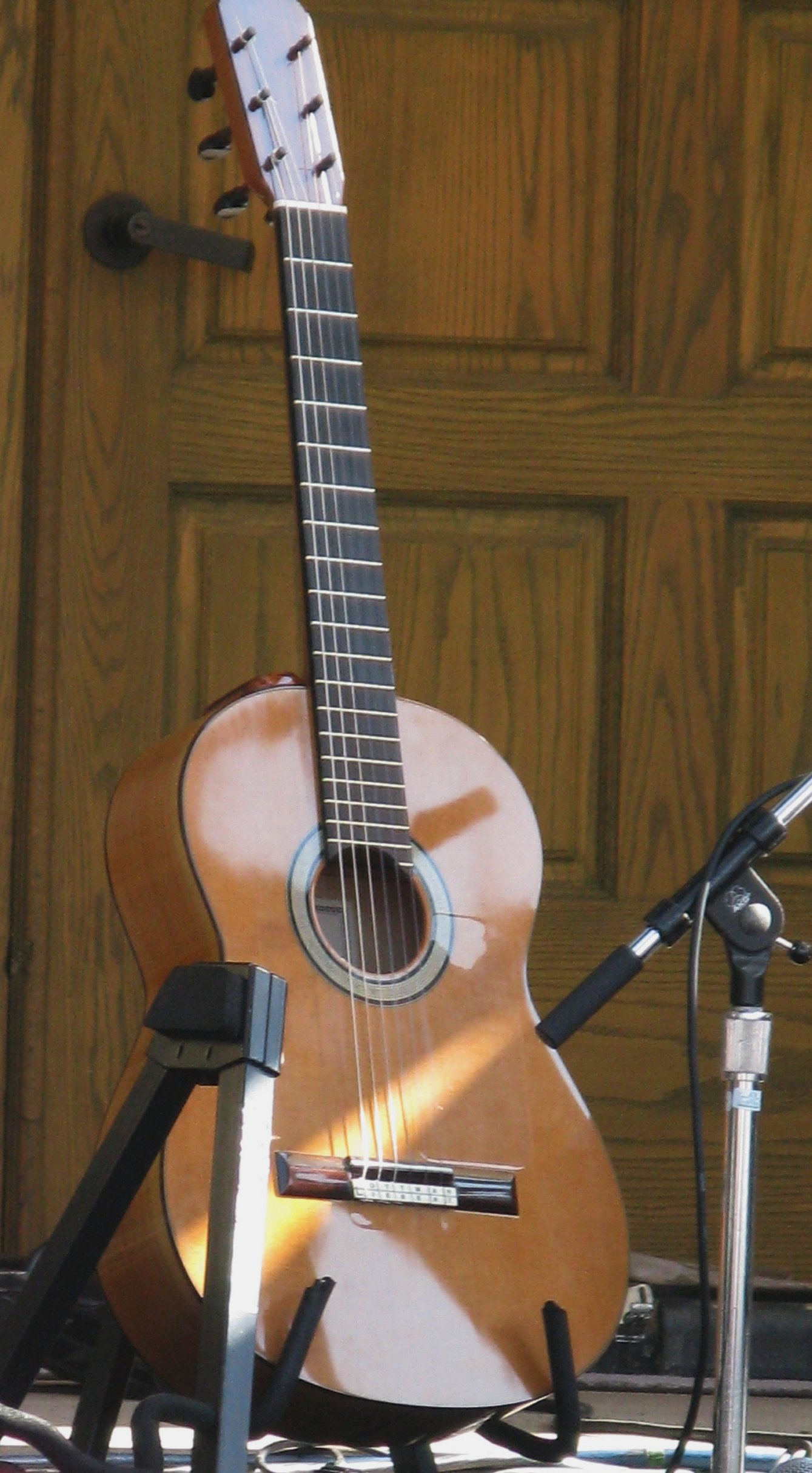
A Lester DeVoe owned by Ottmar Liebert

Lester DeVoe (born 1951) is an American elite flamenco and classical guitar luthier who designs guitars for Latin music. He has been cited as "among the most in-demand flamenco guitar makers alive today".

== Company ==
DeVoe originally had aspirations of becoming a professional player as he took up playing in the San Francisco Bay Area, but ventured into building guitars instead, influenced by his teacher's 1924 Santos Hernández guitar. His first guitar was made using an instruction book. Lester DeVoe has been a luthier since 1975. His workshop is in Nipomo, California.

DeVoe guitars have been used by many musicians, including the late Paco de Lucía and Sabicas, Vicente Amigo, El Viejín, Ottmar Liebert, Amir John Haddad and David Cordoba. Pavel Steidl and Pepe Romero have both played DeVoe classical guitars. Many of the guitars are made from Brazilian Rosewood.
