= Opium (Ottmar Liebert album) =

Studio album by Ottmar Liebert
- Released: March 12, 1996
- Studio: Spiral Subwave in Santa Fe, NM
- Genre: New-age
- Length: 2:05:36
- Label: Epic Records
- Producer: Ottmar Liebert, Stefan Liebert

Ottmar Liebert chronology
¡Viva! (1995)	Opium (1996)	Leaning Into the Night (1997)

Opium is a studio double album by German-born guitarist Ottmar Liebert and his band Luna Negra. The album's first disc is called "Wide-Eyed" and features an upbeat, nuevo flamenco sound, reflective of Liebert's previous work. The second disc is called "Dreaming" which features a mellower, ethereal sound. Opium was nominated for a Grammy Award in 1997 for Best New Age Album. The album was inspired by a postcard that Liebert received from his paternal grandfather, who had worked on the South Manchuria Railway. Opium was produced by Ottmar Liebert, along with his brother, Stefan Liebert.

== Track listing ==
Disc 1: Wide-Eyed
No.	Title	Length
1.	"Nuevo México"	4:32
2.	"Alegria Árabe" (version 1.1)	4:15
3.	"Turkish Night"	4:28
4.	"Ocean Blvd./Miami"	4:06
5.	"Santa Fe 2 Chama"	4:44
6.	"Trémulo (De Mi Corazón)"	5:01
7.	"Bed of Nails (Wide-Eyed Trance)"	4:51
8.	"Montana Walking"	4:32
9.	"Tangos de Tesuque"	5:00
10.	"Snakeoilsurfer"	4:33
11.	"Serenity on Ultracloud" (tribal mix)	4:09
12.	"Butterfly + Juniper" (4 Kelly)	4:53
13.	"Vudu (Technicolor Eyes Burn Thru)"	3:49
14.	"Bulería de Rojo" (4 MC)	3:37
Total length:		62:30

Disc 2: Dreaming
No.	Title	Length
1.	"Serenity on Ultracloud" (mellow mix)	4:09
2.	"Yasmeen"	5:06
3.	"Ayer - El Último Dia de Palabra"	1:09
4.	"Old Man On the Citadel"	4:17
5.	"Anyong / Grandfather Smiling" (walkie-talkie mix)	2:57
6.	"Te Siento"	3:34
7.	"Freedom" (4 Lobsang Samten)	1:40
8.	"Buleria de las Golondrinas"	4:43
9.	"La Acequia Madre"	2:24
10.	"Chama 2 Santa Fe"	4:55
11.	"Chi-Wahwah Beauty"	4:43
12.	"Drop of Water On a Dry Stone"	2:04
13.	"Slow Burn / Pain + Pleasure"	4:35
14.	"Bluedreamdrops"	2:03
15.	"Ripple / Wind Over Water" (4 Darryl Reanney)	3:48
16.	"The Blink Of an I Contains Eternity" (4 Mother)	4:58
17.	"Anyong / Grandfather Singing" (Gibson mix / 4 Bok Yun)	3:07
18.	"Opium"	2:54
Total length:		63:06

== Personnel ==
=== Ottmar Liebert + Luna Negra ===
- Ottmar Liebert – Flamenco Guitar, Fretless Lute, electric guitar, Synthesizer
- Jon Gagan – Electric Bass Guitars, Synthesizer
- Stefan Liebert – Drum Programming, Samples
- Mark Clark – Percussion
- Eric Schermerhorn – Electric guitar
- Woody Thompson – Percussion
- Carl Coletti – Drum Kit

=== Additional personnel ===
- Magali Amadei – voices
- Ashkan Sahihi – voices
- Bok Yun Chon – voices
- Lobsang Samten – voices
- Olga Kammerer – voices
- Charles Rook – engineering
- Gary Lyons – engineering, mixing
- Doug Sax – mastering
- Gavin Lurssen – mastering

== Sales and certifications ==
Region	Certification	Certified units/sales
United States (RIAA)	2× Platinum (Latin)	200,000^{^}
^{^} Shipments figures based on certification alone.

== Notes ==
1. All music written by Ottmar Liebert + published by Sony ATV Songs/Luna Negra Music/BMI.
2. Mastering: Analog – at The Mastering Lab in Los Angeles, CA
