= Thomas Otten =

- Genres: New-age, classical crossover
- Years active: 1999–present
- Labels: Higher Octave; Strathan Music
- Website: strathan.com

Thomas Otten is a French countertenor singer in the Classical Crossover style.

Otten was classically trained as a child, learning piano and singing in chamber choirs. His voice did not break as thoroughly as usual upon reaching adolescence, retaining a high contralto range. Abandoning a career as a biologist, Otten studied for a diploma in lyrical song at the Conservatoire National de Région (CNR) in Lille followed by further studies in early music at the CNR in Paris. Signed to EMI subsidiary, Virgin Music, and released his first album, Close to Silence, in 1999, which was composed by Frédéric Momont. A second album, Portraits, followed in 2003 also released by Virgin Music (both albums were released in USA on Higher Octave label). A compilation disc was released by Strathan Media Productions in 2007, followed by a duo album with Stéphanie Arcadias released by Strathan Music in 2011. The album, Transcend to Void, with Kyle Kamal Helou on Shakuhachi, released on Magnatune.com (August 2014).

On 2 December 2022, Otten released the EP Espiritu (25th Anniversary - New Release), a 6 track compilation of remixes of the ground breaking crossover classical track originally released back in 1999 from the album Close to Silence.

In late December 2022, after a lengthy break from releasing new material, Otten released the album Voices of the Odyssey, a collection of previously released tracks and newly produced ones. Showcasing the album release, the track Offelini(Symphonic Orchestra a new recording)was also released.

In April 2023, Offralina The Black Opera album was released. Soon after, the single track Dominei was also released.

In August 2023 original producer Frederic Momont working in conjunction with Cattafesta Phillipe and Simon Arduin, released the 4 version remixed track Dulciate(The Remix Collection)from Close to Silence on digital platforms.

On 25 August 2023 ‘Odyssey’ featuring both Thomas Otten and vocalist Stephanie Arcadias was released. A ‘new’ re-recorded version of the classical crossover 2011 album ‘Two Voices’ with just the reprise of Beautiful Memories omitted and in a different track running order.

== Discography ==
- 1999 - Close to Silence (Virgin Music)
- 2003 - Portraits (Virgin Music)
- 2007 - Open Wings (Strathan Media Productions) (compilation of tracks on Close to Silence and Portraits)
- 2011 - Two Voices with Stéphanie Arcadias (Strathan Music)
- 2014 - Transcend to Void with Kyle Kamal Helou (Magnatune.com)
- 2022 - Espiritu (25th Anniversary new recording EP of remixes
- 2022 - Offelini (Symphonic Orchestra new recording) single track
- 2022 - Voices of the Odyssey (compilation of previously released songs and new ones)
- 2023 - Offralina The Black Opera
- 2023 - Dulciate (The Remix Collection EP) Frédéric Mormont
- 2023 - Odyssey Thomas Otten & Stephanie Arcadias (Re-recorded version of Two Voices)
