= The Soto Koto Band =

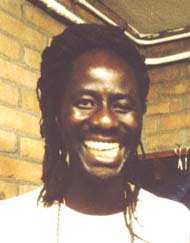

Background information
- Origin: Gambia
- Genres: Jazz

The Soto Koto Band is an African jazz band. Their music is primarily influenced by the music of Gambia. A large ensemble, the band performs on wind instruments, string instruments, and percussion. It was formed by Oko Drammeh, a US-based Gambian world music DJ and festival promoter.

An album, Gumbay Dance!, was released in 1991 by Abdel Kabirr & The Soto Koto Band. It was issued on the Higher Octave's World sublabel, as were two following albums. Kabirr is a West African vocalist. A self-titled album, The Soto Koto Band, was released in 1993. One of the album's tracks, "Korajulo", was included on a compilation album issued by The Nature Company around the same time. In 1994, a third album, Mandingo Beat, was released. It features Gambian vocalist Paps Touray.

Their song, "Kelefa", was a Recommended Track in CMJ New Music Report in 1999.
