= Mystic Island =

Studio album by Cusco
- Released: 1989
- Genre: Andean new age
- Label: Higher Octave

Cusco chronology
Tales from a Distant Land (1987)	Mystic Island (1989)	Ring der Delphine (1989)

Mystic Island is an album by the German Andean new age band Cusco. It was released in 1989, and was the band's second worldwide album release through Higher Octave Music.

Unlike its Higher Octave predecessor, Apurimac, Mystic Island has less to do with Andean music and flute and more with a mixture of global melodies. The album overall is a compilation of previous tracks released by the band under the Prudence label, but the tracks on this album are re-mixed and contain a smoother, more modern quality than the originals. Most of the tracks on this album originally came from the albums Planet Voyage and Tales from a Distant Land, while North Easter (Cool Islands) and Catalina (Desert Island) are exceptions. While Catalina and The Fox and the Lady sound practically identical to the original album versions, the other tracks have very noticeable differences. For instance, Milky Way, where traditional rock beats have been replaced by more "natural" percussions, and Lonely Rose, which now features the signature pan flutes in the chorus.

== Track listing ==
1. "North Easter"
2. "Lucky Jack"
3. "Catalina"
4. "Fireshoes"
5. "Solitude"
6. "Leo"
7. "The Fox and the Lady"
8. "Milky Way"
9. "Lonely Rose"
10. "Pisces"
