= Desert Island (album) =

Studio album by Cusco
- Released: 1980
- Genre: New age
- Label: Autobahn
- Producer: Michael Holm

Cusco chronology
Desert Island (1980)	Cusco II (1981)

Desert Island is the 1980 debut album of German cross-cultural new-age band Cusco. The album attained high popularity in the form of sales in Japan and Korea.

== Track listing ==
No.	Title	Length
1.	"Desert Island"	3:33
2.	"Lampedusa"	4:41
3.	"Helgoland"	3:46
4.	"Catalina"	4:15
5.	"Straits of Hormuz"	4:51
6.	"Galapagos"	3:51
7.	"Alcatraz"	4:30
8.	"Hokkaido"	4:03
9.	"Herrenchiemsee"	4:52
10.	"Ireland"	3:48
