= Apurimac (album) =

Studio album by Cusco
- Released: 1985
- Recorded: 1984
- Genre: Andean new age
- Label: Higher Octave

Cusco chronology
Island Cruise (1984)	Apurimac (1985)	Concierto de Aranjuez (1986)

Apurimac is an album by the German Andean new age band Cusco. Though their sound has certainly matured over the years, this was the breakout album by the band, garnering their first major international success with its release on the Higher Octave music label.

The album was originally written in 1984 and released in select markets in 1985, but it was not until 1988 that the project was finally released worldwide via the new signing with Higher Octave. This album would become the first in a trilogy, with the second and third installments released in 1994 and 1997. Despite the band's name implying an ancient South American sound, this was the first album that specifically focused on blending native Incan instrumentation with traditional European rock music structures (synthesized pan flute sounds, which previously were used only sporadically, are brought to the forefront here).

Inca Dance is used as the closing theme of the radio show Coast to Coast AM, and other tracks have been used as bumper music for the same show. Several songs from the album, including Inca Dance and Flute Battle, have been used as background music at the Epcot theme park at Walt Disney World Resort. The opening theme of the aforementioned song is also copied note-for-note from a pan flute player in Werner Herzog's 1972 film, Aguirre, The Wrath of God. In addition, Tupac Amaru still receives radio play in certain markets today.

== Track listing ==
1. "Apurimac" (Michael Holm/Majo Rolyat) – 3:43
2. "Flute Battle" (Holm/Kristian Schultze) – 2:35
3. "Tupac Amaru" (Schultze) – 3:03
4. "Flying Condor" (Schultze) – 5:02
5. "Inca Dance" (Schultze) – 2:43
6. "Pastorale" (Holm/Schultze) – 2:22
7. "Amazonas" (Holm) – 3:47
8. "Inca Bridges" (Holm/Wolff-Ekkehard Stein/Wolfgang Jass) – 3:21
9. "Andes" (Schultze) – 3:51
10. "Atahualpa - The Last Inca" (Schultze/Michael Ruff) – 3:51
11. "Fighting Inca" (Schultze) – 3:22
12. "Apurimac II" (Holm/Rolyat) – 1:29

== Album credits ==
- Kristian Schultze – Keyboards
- Michael Holm – Keyboards, producer, photography
- Todd Canedy – drums
- Hansi Strohr – Bass
- Billy Lang - Guitar
- Johannes Walter – Photography
- Dee Westlund – Art direction
- Murry Whiteman – Design
- Tom Baker – Mastering
- Jochen Scheffter – Engineer
- Cusco – Performer
