= Bumper music =

Short clips of signature songs or theme music

Bumper music, also known as a bump, is a radio broadcasting term for short clips of signature songs or theme music used to transition between different elements of a program. These clips typically last no longer than fifteen seconds. Bumper music is also played at music venues, such as concerts, before the show begins. Its purpose is to create, and fill the air with, a musical atmosphere.

In radio, bumper music is commonly used when a syndicated program takes a break for local station identification or when it goes to a radio advertisement. In today's radio landscape, it is often referred to as a "bump," and NPR uses the term "button" as well. When the bumper music marks the end of a local break on a radio network, it is sometimes called "rejoiner music."

== See also ==
- Continuity (broadcasting)
- Bumper (broadcasting)
- Sting (musical phrase)
- Theme music
- Voice-over
