= Michael Holm =

German singer, musician, songwriter and record producer (born 1943)

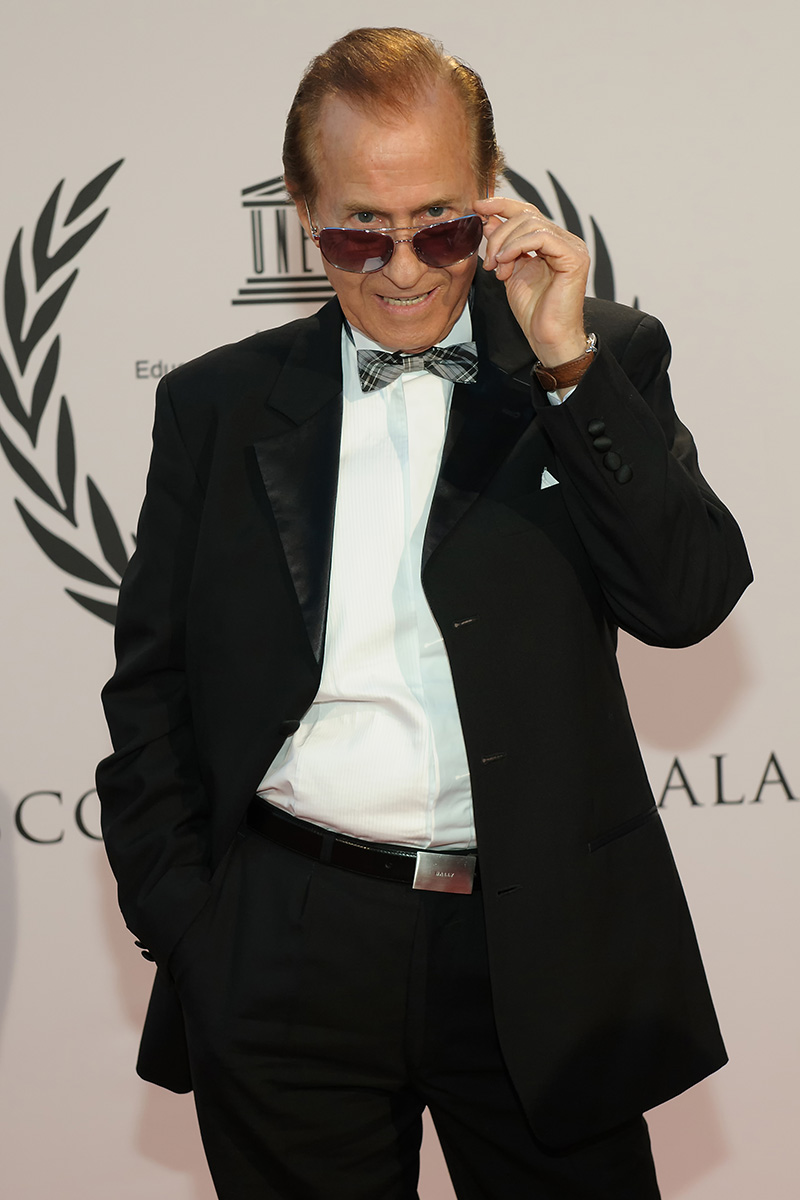
- Holm at the 2012 UNESCO Gala

Background information
- Born: Lothar Bernhard Walter; 29 July 1943 (age 83); Stettin, Germany
- Genre: Pop
- Occupations: Singer, musician, songwriter, record producer
- Instrument: Vocals
- Formerly of: Cusco

Michael Holm (born Lothar Walter; on 29 July 1943) is a German singer, musician, songwriter and record producer. He is primarily known as a singer of Schlager music. Although his first appearance in the hit parade was in 1962 ("Lauter schöne Worte"), he had his first big hit in 1969. "Mendocino", the German adaptation of a song by the Sir Douglas Quintet, was the biggest selling single that year in (Germany). The record was released in September 1969, reached number three for five weeks, selling over a million copies. Ariola presented him with a gold record in October 1970.

Further hits such as "Barfuß im Regen" (1970), "Tränen lügen nicht" (literally, "Tears Don't Lie", recorded in English as "When A Child Is Born") (1974) and "Musst Du jetzt gerade gehen, Lucille" (1977) followed. He also composed the music for the popular international horror movie Mark of the Devil (1970). Outside of Germany, he is best known for his work as a member of the new age band Cusco, along with Kristian Schultze.

A year-long artistic collaboration and private friendship connects him with the musician and producer Giorgio Moroder. As a duo, they released several singles and an album.

== Albums ==
- 1970: Auf der Straße nach Mendocino
- 1970: Mendocino
- 1970: Mademoiselle Ninette
- 1971: Michael Holm
- 1972: Meine Songs
- 1972: I Will Return
- 1973: Stories
- 1973: Spinach 1 (as Spinach)
- 1975: Tränen lügen nicht – Lieder zum Träumen
- 1975: Wenn ein Mann ein Mädchen liebt
- 1975: I'll Return
- 1976: Greatest Hits
- 1976: Zwei Gesichter
- 1977: Poet der Straße
- 1978: Labyrinth
- 1979: El Lute
- 1980: Halt mich fest
- 1981: Im Jahr der Liebe
- 2004: Liebt Euch!
- 2007: Mal die Welt
- 2010: Holm 2011
- 2013: 1000 Wege
- 2017: Als die alten Zeiten jung war'n

== Singles ==
- 1961: Ich Will Dich Immer Wieder Küssen / Nur Für Verliebte (as Die Missouris)
- 1961: Sage Mir Nie Goodbye / Bin So Allein (as Die Missouris)
- 1961: Texas Jimmy / Heute Abend (Da Bin Ich Ein Glücklicher Mann) (as Die Missouris)
- 1962: Golden Hill (...Und Die Sonne Brannte Heiß) / Grüß Mir Meine Texasbraut (as Die Missouris)
- 1962: Der King / Wer Hält Das Aus / (as Die Missouris)
- 1962: Bald Wirst Du Wieder Glücklich Sein / Darum Bleib' Ich Bei Dir
- 1962: Das Lied Von Der Liebe (Wild In The Country) / Denk Nicht Mehr Daran, O Cowboy
- 1962: Lauter Schöne Worte / Leider, Leider (Die Sunnies & das Cornel Trio)
- 1962: Die junge Liebe Ist Süß / Ja, Das Wird Schön Sein (Die Sunnies & das Cornel Trio)
- 1962: Kannst Du Tanzen / Küss Mich Mal (With Susie Becker)
- 1962: Gitarren Spielt Auf! / Zwei Gitarren am Meer (Gitarren-Serenade) (as Die Missouris)
- 1962: Happy Birthday, Josefin / Einmal Werden Wir Uns Wiedersehen
- 1963: Alles Geld Dieser Welt / So Jung Und Verliebt (and Die Moonlights)
- 1963: Baby Doll / Liebe Mich Und Geh Mit Mir
- 1963: Das Muß Die Liebe Sein / Es Kommt Der Tag (and Die Moonlights)
- 1963: Hello Boys (Er Ist Arm, Sie Ist Reich) / Bossa Nova Baby (as Die Missouris)
- 1963: Komm In Das Tal Am Colorado / Die Trude Mit Dem Treuen Blick (as Die Missouris)
- 1964: Komm, Wir Schaun Noch Mal Zu Johnny Rein / Sandy, Sandy (as Die Missouris)
- 1964: Ciribiribin / Du Gehst Vorbei An Mir (With Cornehlsen Chor)
- 1964: Alle Wünsche Kann Man Nicht Erfüllen / Es Liegt Nur An Dir (With Alexander Gordan Chor)
- 1964: Das Kannst Du Mir Nicht Verbieten / Crazy Daisy (& Die Sunnies)
- 1964: Blue Beat Baby / Hallo Du, Hör Mal Zu! (as Mike & Joe)
- 1964: Wie Geht's / Ich Möchte Wissen, Was Du Denkst (as Mike & Joe & Die Rebel Guys)
- 1965: Clap Hands Polka (Sing Tra-La-La) / Das Kann Nicht Sein (as Mike & Joe)
- 1965: Summer In Hawaii / Die Sonne Grüßt Am Horizont (as Blue Brothers)
- 1965: Alle Wensen Kan Men Niet Vervullen / Zeg Nimmer Of Nooit
- 1965: Das Kann Doch Nicht Das Ende Sein / Laß Mich Gehn
- 1965: Ain't Got No Money / Hokey-Pokey (as The Rebel Guys)
- 1965: Let's Get Together / I Cry For Cindy (as The Rebel Guys)
- 1966: So-la-la / Moolah Man (as The Rebel Guys)
- 1966: S.O.S. - Herz In Not / Der Anfang Vom Ende
- 1966: Es Kam Wie Der Blitz / Kein Alibi (She Rides With Me)
- 1966: Wolly Bully / Boys And Girls (as The Hippies)
- 1967: Heimweh / Ich Kann Dich Nicht Vergessen
- 1967: 1000 Volt / Flower Power Time
- 1967: Das Sag Ich Dir, Wenn Wir Allein Sind / Vertrau Auf Mich (as Gary & The Gamblers)
- 1968: Hippy-Hippy / Love In (as The Hippies)
- 1968: Muny, Muny, Muny / Friends (as The Daisy Clan)
- 1968: Mr. Walkie Talkie / Lions In The Tree (as The Daisy Clan)
- 1968: Billy Vanilly / Hound Dog Bob & Lena (as The Daisy Clan)
- 1968: Top Secret! / Ich Halt' Zu Dir
- 1968: Regenprinzessin / Eine Sommernacht
- 1969: Eine Sommernacht / Days Of Pearly Spencer
- 1969: Mendocino / Es Könnte Möglich Sein
- 1969: Mendocino (English Version) / Cutey Girl
- 1969: Bonnie Bonnie Bonnie / Friends (as The Daisy Clan)
- 1970: Love Needs Love / Glory Be (as The Daisy Clan)
- 1970: Madmoiselle Ninette / Sandy
- 1970: Madmoiselle Ninette (English Version) / Sandy (English Version) (as Mike Holm)
- 1970: Wie Der Sonnenschein (Shalala Oh Oh) / Sandy
- 1970: Barfuß Im Regen / Es Tut Weh
- 1970: America, America / Rhythm Of Love (as Spinach)
- 1971: San Francisco China Town / Ridin' A Rainbow (as The Daisy Clan)
- 1971: Action Man (part 1) / Action Man (part 2) (as Spinach)
- 1971: Ein Verrückter Tag / Mon Amour Diane
- 1971: That's Right / Mon Amour Diane (English Version)
- 1971: Dancing In The Sun / Nachts Scheint Die Sonne
- 1971: Nachts Scheint Die Sonne (Son Of My Father) / Smog In Frankfurt
- 1972: Let It Happen Tonight / Love Be Good To Me (as The Daisy Clan)
- 1972: Das Geht Vorüber / Kama Baby (as The Daisy Clan)
- 1972: (Sweet Sixteen) You Know What I Mean / Knockin' On Your Door (as Spinach)
- 1972: Du Weinst Um Mich (I Will Return) / Bitte Bleib Ein Bißchen Länger, Mary Ann
- 1972: I Will Return / You Left One Rainy Evening, Caroline
- 1972: Es Ist Schön, Bei Dir Zu Sein / Santiago
- 1972: Gimme, Gimme Your Love / Oh, Oh July
- 1972: Gimme, Gimme Your Love (English Version) / If You Go (as Mike Holm)
- 1973: Halte Fest, Den Der Dich Liebt / Leg' Dein Herz Nicht In Den Eisschrank
- 1973: My Lady Of Spain / Halte Fest, Den Der Dich Liebt
- 1973: Other Way Round / I'd Love You to Want Me
- 1973: Baby, Du Bist Nicht Alleine / Giorgio Und Ich
- 1974: Soleado / Georgio And Me
- 1974: Nur Ein Kuss, Maddalena / Doch Sie Schaut Immer Vorbei
- 1974: Mi Dama De España / Other Way Round
- 1974: Tränen Lügen Nicht / Es Regnet Schon Die Ganze Nacht
- 1974: When A Child Is Born / The Other Way Round
- 1975: Kiss Me Kiss Your Baby / Der Sommer Auf Dem Land (as Peppermint)
- 1975: El Matador / Hello Mama, Hello Papa
- 1975: Gardenia Blue / Eine Reise Ohne Wiederkehr
- 1975: I'll Return (Tornero) / A Man Who Loves A Woman
- 1975: Wart' Auf Mich (Du, Wenn Ich Dich Verlier') (Tornero) / Geh' Doch Heim, Little Girl
- 1976: Lady Love / Hey Music
- 1976: Lady Love (English Version) / Hey Music (English Version)
- 1976: Lass Dein Herz Doch Frei / Ein Großer Garten Ist Diese Welt
- 1976: Wenn Dein Herz Spricht / Manhattan
- 1976: Manhattan / Bring Mich Heim, Du Weite Straße
- 1976: When A Child Is Born / Merry Christmas
- 1976: Havin´ A Party / Splish Splash
- 1977: Ask Your Heart / Manhattan (English Version)
- 1977: Tränen Lügen Nicht / Mendocino
- 1977: Desperado / Do Ya Love
- 1977: Colorado (Desperado) / Manhattan
- 1977: Musst Du Jetzt Grade Gehen, Lucille / Bring Mich Heim, Du Weite Straße
- 1978: Allein Mit Dir / Zuviel Rauch In Diesem Raum
- 1978: Traum-Hotel / Liebe Geht Nie Verlor'n
- 1978: Wer Ist Dein Freund / San Antonio Highway
- 1978: Saudade / Einer Von Vielen
- 1979: Ich Weiß, Du Denkst, Ich Bin Ein Schlechter Mensch / Sprich Mit Mir Nicht Über Liebe
- 1979: El Lute / Wer Lügt, Gewinnt
- 1979: Wenn Die Zukunft Beginnt / Ohne Pass Keine Arbeit
- 1980: Kind (Anak) / Samstagabendträumer
- 1980: Leb Wohl (Vive) / Menschen Ohne Ziel
- 1981: Ein Junggeselle / Halt Mich Fest
- 1981: Mit 17 Fängt Das Leben Erst An / Einer Denkt Immer An Dich
- 1981: So Weit Die Füsse Tragen / Wir
- 1981: Liebe Braucht Nähe / Die Nacht Hat 1000 Augen
- 1982: Fällt Der Vorhang Für Uns Zwei / Schlaf Nicht Ein
- 1984: Einsamkeit Danach / Die Nacht Hat 1000 Augen
- 1986: Insel Im Strom / Wir
- 1991: Elektrisiert / Reit Auf Den Wolken
- 2001: Maddalena 2001 (con Olaf Henning)
- 2005: Liebt Euch!
- 2008: Shy Boy (Mestengo) (as Michael Holm And Monty Robert)
- 2010: Schwarz-Rot-Gold
- 2011: Märchenprinzen
- 2011: Sie Ist Eine Kriegerin
- 2012: Wie Viele Sommer Noch

== Collections ==
- 1970: Mendocino
- 1973: Schlager-Rendezvous mit Michael Holm
- 1974: Alle Wünsche kann man nicht erfüllen
- 1974: Die großen Erfolge
- 1974: Seine großen Erfolge
- 1977: Die goldenen Super 20
- 1977: Portrait eines Stars
- 1978: Star Discothek
- 1980: Seine großen Erfolge [1980]
- 1982: Das Star Album
- 1990: Das große deutsche Schlager-Archiv (con Heintje)
- 1991: Star Collection
- 1991: Star Portrait
- 1992: So weit die Füße tragen
- 1993: Golden Stars
- 1994: Mendocino [1994]
- 1994: Große Erfolge
- 1994: Meine größten Erfolge
- 1995: Die Singles 1961 bis 1965
- 1995: Alle Wünsche kann man nicht erfüllen [1995]
- 1995: Mein Gefühl für Dich
- 1995: Meine schönsten Erfolge
- 1995: Szene Star
- 1997: Tränen lügen Nicht – Seine schönsten Lieder
- 1999: Das Beste – Die Telefunken-Singles 1961–1965
- 2000: Golden Stars – The Best Of
- 2000: Seine großen Erfolge [2000]
- 2000: Alle Wünsche kann man nicht erfüllen [2000]
- 2002: Wie der Sonnenschein
- 2005: Tränen lügen Nicht
- 2007: Hautnah – Die Geschichten meiner Stars
- 2007: Seine großen Erfolge [2007]
- 2009: Dieter Thomas Heck präsentiert: 40 Jahre ZDF Hitparade
- 2009: Die Schlager Parade
- 2012: Best Of Michael Holm – Tränen lügen Nicht
- 2012: Balladen
- 2013: Bild Schlager Stars
- 2013: Best Of Michael Holm
