= Kristian Schultze =

German musician (1945–2011)

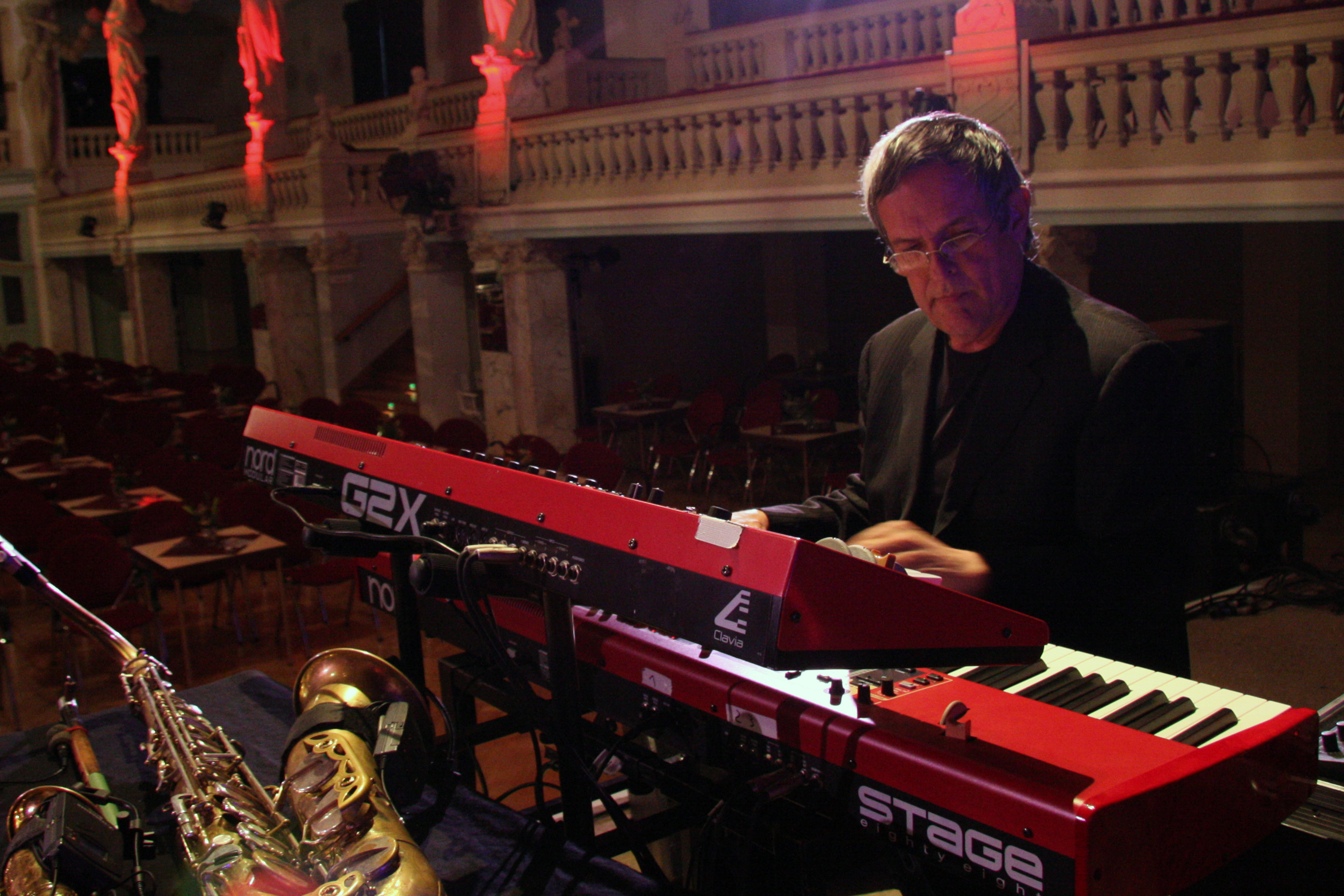

Kristian Schultze (21 January 1945 – 22 November 2011) was one-half of the German new-age band Cusco. Schultze partnered with Michael Holm and the two produced numerous new-age albums. The two met in late 1970s, when they discovered that they shared a similar interest in pre-colonial America. Schultze also released a number of solo albums.

== Biography ==
Kristian Schultze was the son of Norbert Schultze, the composer of "Lili Marleen", and Iwa Wanja, a Bulgarian actress and singer. He grew up in Hamburg, Rio de Janeiro and Berlin, and got his musical education at Konservatorium and Musikhochschule Berlin, Wiener Akademie and Jazzschool Graz. He moved to Munich in 1968 where he worked as composer, arranger, producer and musician for various artists, for movies, television and theater.

As a keyboard player, he joined the group Passport of Klaus Doldinger in 1973 and recorded the albums "Looking Thru", "Cross Collateral", "Infinity Machine" and "Iguacu" with them. They undertook tours of Asia, United States, Australia, Brazil and Germany. In 1977, he left the band and played in the group "Snowball" with Curt Cress (drums), Dave King (bass guitar) and Roy Albrighton, the former lead singer with NEKTAR.

In 1979, Kristian and Michael Holm started the studio project "Cusco". They produced 22 albums and semi-albums, and consistently charted near the top of the New Age charts.

In 1985, he and his wife Birgid moved to the Bavarian countryside, where they rented a house in Bad Tölz, a small village facing the Bavarian Alps. He built his second D.I. studio in that house and continued to work as composer, arranger, sound designer and keyboard-soloist for dozens of national and international artists. From 1986, Kristian studied computer theory, learned some computer languages, and became a beta tester for software companies in Germany. Some of his ideas made their way into major studio programs like Notator. From 1988, Kristian practiced meditation techniques, and from 1990 until 1993 he was a student in breath therapy (HAKOMI method). Through the inspiration of his wife, who during the years has become a healing specialist, Kristian tried to integrate his experiences into his compositions.

His last two solo albums, Colours of Inner Peace and Born to Breathe, both released 1996 under the GIB label, give examples of this new way of music writing, and his constant work with Michael Holm and Cusco also reflect some of these compositional developments.

Kristian died of a heart attack in Bad Tölz, Bavaria, aged 66.
