= Higher Octave Music =

- Founded: 1983
- Headquarters: Los Angeles, California, United States
- Area served: Worldwide
- Parent: Universal Music Group

Higher Octave Music is a sub-label imprint of Narada Productions. Since 2013, it is part of Universal Music Group's Capitol Music Group, which is located in Los Angeles.

== History ==
Higher Octave was acquired by Virgin Records on behalf of EMI in 1997. In 2004, Higher Octave's offices in Malibu, California, were closed and the label was folded into Narada Productions at a reduced level of staffing and activity while retaining its imprint as a sub-label of Narada.

Two years later, Higher Octave moved to New York along with Narada and all of its related sub-labels to become part of EMI's merging all of its adult-focused music into The Blue Note Label Group.

High Octave has had several sub-labels, such as OmTown and CyberOctave.

== Roster ==
- 3rd Force
- Acoustic Alchemy
- Adiemus
- Jon Anderson
- William Aura
- B-Tribe
- Buckethead
- Craig Chaquico
- Cusco
- Deuter
- Four80East
- Robin Frederick
- Himekami
- Brian Hughes
- Ottmar Liebert
- Jim McCarty
- Moroccan Spirit
- Mythos
- Les Nubians
- John O'Connor
- Opafire
- Thomas Otten
- Kate Price
- Sacred Spirit
- Bryan Savage
- Neal Schon
- Shahin & Sepehr
- The Soto Koto Band
- Chris Spheeris
- Claus Zundel

== See also ==
- List of record labels
