= Cusco (band) =

German musical group

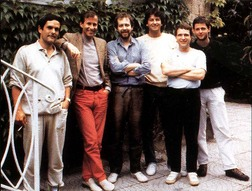

Background information
- Origin: Weilheim in Oberbayern, Germany
- Genres: New age; world music; instrumental
- Works: Cusco discography
- Years active: 1979–2011
- Labels: Higher Octave; Arista Records; BSC Music; Philips; Sony Music; Virgin Records; Prudence; Yupiteru Records
- Past members: Michael Holm; Kristian Schultze
- Website: lucille.de/cusco

Cusco was a German cross-cultural new-age music band named after the Peruvian city of Cusco, which was once the capital of the Inca Empire. The band's music contains influences from music around the world, with an emphasis on South American flute sounds and melodies. Cusco's melodic and energetic music is a fusion of modern and ethnic styles with influences from classical music and rock music sensibilities. Most of the ethnic instruments were keyboard-generated.

The band was led by founders Michael Holm (Lothar Bernhard Walter; 1943–) and Kristian Schultze (1945–2011). Michael Holm, already a successful vocal artist, sought to make a musical tribute to ancient cultures. He and Kristian Schultze, formerly a member of the jazz band Passport, shared musical and historical interests. In 1979, they formed Cusco, and released their first album in 1980. They eventually signed with Higher Octave Music, releasing their first album on that label in 1988. Their albums consistently reached very high peaks on the instrumental/new-age music sales charts. They were nominated for a Grammy award three times.

Cusco's music was frequently used as pre-show background music in Epcot prior to IllumiNations: Reflections of Earth, and has been used as bumper music for the popular American syndicated radio program Coast to Coast AM, as well as several television advertisements, including a Bud Ice beer commercial. Additionally, Cusco composed and performed symphonic new age music for the German television special Sielmann 2000. Until his death in 2011, Schultze resided in Weilheim in Oberbayern, Germany; Holm still lives there.

== See also ==
- Cusco discography
