= Lara & Reyes =

- Origin: San Antonio, Texas, United States
- Genres: New flamenco, Latin, jazz, instrumental, World
- Years active: 1992–2006
- Labels: Talking Taco Records, Higher Octave Music, Fusion Acustica Music
- Members: Sergio Lara; Joe Reyes

Lara & Reyes is an instrumental group founded by Sergio Lara and Joe Reyes in 1989. It performed flamenco-influenced Latin guitar instrumental pieces. Their first album Two Guitars - One Passion released in 1992 under Talking Taco Records Record Label, the album was available only at the duo's concerts and in a limited number of record stores around their home of San Antonio, Texas, later the album was released in 1996 under Higher Octave Music Record Label. By the time Two Guitars - One Passion was released in San Antonio, both Joe Reyes and Sergio Lara were receiving top honors in the San Antonio News's annual media awards. Both have won the acoustic guitar category, for instance, and Sergio's mandolin playing won him a first place award in the miscellaneous instrument category. The two have won the San Antonio Current award as "Best Latin Band" for two years running.

During their time period, they released seven albums and earned a Latin Grammy Award nomination in 2001 for "Best Instrumental Pop Album" for their 6th album World Jazz.

Their last album Lara & Reyes was released on September 6, 2006, under Fusion Acustica Music Record Label and won "Best Latin Album" on the 2007 Indie Acoustic Project Awards.

== Discography ==
=== Studio albums ===
- Guitarras Hermanas (1995)
- Two Guitars - One Passion (1996)
- Exotico (1996)
- Riverwalk (1998)
- Navidad (2000)
- World Jazz (2000) Nominated for a Latin Grammy Award for Best Instrumental Pop Album
- Lara & Reyes (2006) Won an Indie Acoustic Project Award for Best Latin Album

== Other Compilation Appearances ==
- Higher Octave Collection 2: Music from Around the World, For Around The Clock (1995) (Higher Octave Music)
- KKSF 103.7 FM Sampler For AIDS Relief 6 (1995)
- Higher Octave Music Evolution: 1986-1996: 'As in Music, So in Life' (1996) (Higher Octave Music)
- Panorama: An Expansive Collection of Music from Around the World That Inspires the Heart, Mind and Soul (1996) (Higher Octave Music)
- Gypsy Passion: New Flamenco (1997) (Narada)
- Guitarisma: The Charisma, Passion & Romance of the Guitar (1997) (Higher Octave Music)
- Guitarisma 2: The Charisma, Mystique and Pure Expression of the Guitar (1998) (Higher Octave Music)
- Night + Day: Music to Soothe the Soul and Enliven the Spirit (1998) (Higher Octave Music)
- Au Carrefour De La New Age (1998) (Virgin)
- Higher Octave Is ... World Fusion (1999) (Higher Octave Music)
- Music For The Next Age: Higher Octave Music, Sampler (2000) (Higher Octave Music)
- Guitar Greats: The Best of New Flamenco - Volume I (2000) (Baja/TSR Records)
- Esoterotica: An Innerplay Of Love & Music: Celebrating Higher Octave's 15th Anniversary (2001) (Higher Octave Music)
- Williams-Sonoma Presents Música del Sol (2001) (Williams Sonoma/EMI-Capitol Music)
- The Metropolitan Museum of Art: A Latin Christmas (2005) (EMI Music/Metropolitan Museum of Art)
- The World Of The Spanish Guitar Vol. 1 (2011) (Higher Octave Music)

== See also ==
- New Flamenco
- Flamenco rumba
- Shahin & Sepehr
- Strunz & Farah
- Young & Rollins
- Willie & Lobo
- Johannes Linstead
