= Young & Rollins =

Background information
- Genres: World
- Occupations: composers, guitarists
- Instrument: nylon string Guitar
- Labels: TSR Records, Bolero Records
- Members: Daniel Young; Lawson Rollins
- Website: YoungandRollins.com

Young & Rollins is a guitar duo, consisting of Daniel Young and Lawson Rollins, that performs and records original music which draws upon an eclectic mixture of salsa music, Latin jazz, blues, samba, bossa nova, flamenco, and classical styles. Their music can be broadly described as a melding of Nuevo Flamenco, World Music, and Latin Music genres. Daniel Young and Lawson Rollins began collaborating after meeting in Washington, D.C. in 1998. They came from different musical backgrounds - Rollins started out as a classically trained guitarist before moving into Latin American and flamenco guitar styles, while Young holds a degree in jazz from The New School in New York City.

== Music ==
Their debut recording, Salsa Flamenca, on TSR Records, entered the Billboard top 25 new age chart shortly after its release in 2000. Their follow-up album, Sevilla, was released in 2001.

A half-hour concert of music from Salsa Flamenca was recorded by MHz Networks and broadcast on national television in 2001 and 2005.

In 2005, Young & Rollins joined with Bolero Records and released Esperanza. Their follow-up, Mosaic, was released in 2006.

The music of Young & Rollins appears on a growing list of compilation albums, including Guitar Greats: The Best of New Flamenco, featuring music by Young & Rollins, Ottmar Liebert, Strunz & Farah, Armik, Oscar Lopez, Govi, Shahin & Sepehr, Lara & Reyes, and Jesse Cook. Other compilation titles include: Tabu: Mondo Flamenco, Bolero Gypsies: New Flamenco, Volume 1, and Caravan.

The Young & Rollins Quintet has performed at several international venues and festivals since the group's inception, including the Perth International Arts Festival in Australia, the New Zealand International Arts Festival, the Kennedy Center in Washington D.C., the Utah Arts Festival, the Salisbury Festival in England, and the Sydney Opera House.

== Discography ==
=== Albums ===
- Salsa Flamenca (2000)
- Sevilla (2001)
- Esperanza (2005)
- Mosaic (2006)

=== Compilations ===
- Musica del Sol (2001) (Williams-Sonoma/EMI-Capitol Music)
- Tabu: Mondo Flamenco (2001) (Narada)
- Guitar Greats: The Best of New Flamenco, Volume 1 (2000) (Baja Records)
- Guitar Greats: The Best of New Flamenco, Volume 2 (2002) (Baja Records)
- Bolero Gypsies: New Flamenco, Volume 1 (2005) (Bolero Records)
- Bolero Gypsies: New Flamenco, Volume 2 (2006) (Bolero Records)
- Gypsy Spice: Best Of New Flamenco (2009) (Baja Records)
- The World Of The Spanish Guitar Vol. 1 (2011) (Higher Octave Music)
- Guitar Greats: The Best of New Flamenco, Volume 3 (2013) (Baja Records)

== See also ==
- New Flamenco
- Flamenco rumba
- Lawson Rollins
- Lara & Reyes
- Shahin & Sepehr
- Strunz & Farah
- Johannes Linstead
