= Exotico (album) =

Studio album by Lara & Reyes
- Released: September 17, 1996
- Genre: New Flamenco, Latin jazz, world music
- Length: 57:48
- Label: Higher Octave Music

Lara & Reyes chronology
| Two Guitars One Passion (1996) | Exotico (1996) | Riverwalk (1998) |

Professional ratings
Review scores
| Source | Rating |
|---|---|
| AllMusic | 4/5 stars |

Exotico was the third album released by the flamenco-influenced Latin guitar instrumental duo Lara & Reyes.

== Track listing ==
1. "Exótico" – 5:32
2. "Cascabeles (Rattlers)" – 4:39
3. "Despertar (Awakening)" – 4:51
4. "Bahia del Palmar (Palmer Bay)" – 4:40
5. "Dulce Libertad (Sweet Freedom)" – 5:29
6. "Morning Rain" – 4:20
7. "Mi Ciudad (My City)" – 6:41
8. "Katia's Dance" – 5:47
9. "Falda de Jade (Jade Skirt)" – 4:04
10. "Brazil" – 5:45
11. "Guitarras Ardientes (Burning Guitars)" – 6:16
