= Lawson Rollins =

American guitarist

- Born: North Carolina, U.S.
- Genres: Latin jazz, world, new-age
- Occupations: Musician, composer
- Instrument: Guitar
- Label: Infinita
- Member of: Young & Rollins
- Website: lawsonrollins.com

Lawson Rollins is an American guitarist from North Carolina noted for his virtuoso fingerstyle technique and melodic compositional skills. Guitar Player magazine ranked him as one of the "50 Best Acoustic Guitarists of All Time". His music has risen to #1 on the Billboard charts and is generally classed as Latin jazz and world music, with elements of samba, bossa nova, Middle Eastern, classical guitar, flamenco, and shred guitar. He often employs fast minor scales and diminished scale solo runs to his compositions which are executed in the flamenco picado style.

== Career ==
He is best known for his compositions Free to Fly, World of Wonder, The Fire Cadenza, Santa Ana Wind, Flight, Daybreak, Infinita, and Moonlight Samba and his albums Rise, True North, Dark Matter, Airwaves: The Greatest Hits, Infinite Chill (the remix sessions), 3 Minutes To Midnight, Traveler, Infinita, Espirito, Elevation and Full Circle which were all critically acclaimed by the jazz and guitar communities. He has reached a wide audience on both radio and the internet. Video performances of Locomotion, The Fire Cadenza and Santa Ana Wind have been viewed millions of times on YouTube. His songs "After Twilight", "Free to Fly", "Bluewave Bossanova", "World of Wonder", "Island Time", "Flight", "Daybreak", "Moonlight Samba," and "Infinita" have proven popular on jazz radio stations and landed on the Billboard Top 30 contemporary jazz radio chart. His song "After Twilight" hit number 1 on the Billboard contemporary jazz radio chart. His album Full Circle landed on the Billboard Top 10 World Music album sales chart and he was a Top 100 Artist of the Year on radio as ranked by RadioWave. The song "Shifting Seasons" from Full Circle won the U.S. Songwriting Competition first place award for instrumental song of the year. Lawson was also awarded third place for Artist of the Year. In a separate year he received another first place award in the USA Songwriting Competition for the title track of his Traveler album. The Traveler album also won three gold medals in the Global Music Awards for Instrumentalist, Album, and Top 10 Albums of the Year.

Influenced by Andrés Segovia from his mid-teens, he developed an interest in jazz, flamenco, and improvisational Latin and Brazilian guitar styles in his early twenties. After graduating from Duke University he earned a graduate degree from the London School of Economics, then moved to Washington, D.C. in 1998 where he met guitarist Daniel Young (Dan Young) at a local flamenco shop and formed the Latin guitar fusion group Young & Rollins. They released several albums together, including Salsa Flamenca, which landed on the Billboard Chart in 2000, Sevilla (2001), Esperanza (2005) and Mosaic (2006) and played at venues such as the Kennedy Center and Sydney Opera House. Rollins was based in Washington until 2007 when he moved to San Francisco.

His solo albums are characterized by an eclectic mix of Middle Eastern, Brazilian, and Arabic music fused with Spanish guitar and backed by an all-star cast of musicians from around the world including Israeli singer and composer Idan Raichel, Brazilian singer Flora Purim, percussionist Airto Moreira, Cuban drummer Horacio Hernandez, Shahin Shahida of Shahin and Sepehr, Big Bad Voodoo Daddy, Iranian kamancheh player Kayhan Kalhor, Grammy-winning violinists Mads Tolling and Charlie Bisharat, and electric guitarist Buckethead, among others.

Lawson is a voting member of NARAS, a member of A2IM, and owner of the independent world music record label Infinita Records.

== Discography ==
=== Studio Albums ===
As part of Young & Rollins

- Salsa Flamenca (2000)
- Sevilla (2001)
- Esperanza (2005)
- Mosaic (2006)

Year	Album	Peak chart positions	Label
Year	Album	US World Albums	Label
2008	Infinita	—	Infinita
2010	Espirito	—	Infinita
2011	Elevation	—	Infinita
2013	Full Circle	8	Infinita
2015	Traveler	—	Infinita
2015	Infinite Chill: The Remix Sessions	—	Infinita
2017	3 Minutes to Midnight	—	Infinita
2019	Dark Matter: Music for Film	—	Infinita
2020	True North	—	Infinita
2021	Rise	—	Infinita
2023	Heartwood	—	Infinita
2024	Infinite Chill, Vol. 2	—	Infinita
2026	Next Steps	—	Infinita
"—" denotes a recording that did not chart.

=== Compilation albums ===
Year	Album	Peak chart positions	Label
Year	Album	US World Albums	Label
2018	Airwaves: The Greatest Hits	—	Infinita
"—" denotes a recording that did not chart.

=== Singles ===
Charted singles
Year	Title	Chart positions	Album
Year	Title	Smooth Jazz Airplay	Album
2008	"Infinita" (Lawson Rollins featuring Flora Purim)	30	Infinita
2010	"Moonlight Samba"	18	Espirito
2011	"Daybreak"	22	Elevation
2014	"Flight"	25	Full Circle
2017	"Island Time"	13	3 Minutes to Midnight
2018	"World of Wonder" (Lawson Rollins featuring 3rd Force)	8	Airwaves: The Greatest Hits
2020	"Bluewave Bossanova"	23	True North
2022	"Free to Fly"	14	Rise
2024	"After Twilight" (Lawson Rollins featuring Shahin Shahida)	1	Infinite Chill, Vol. 2
2026	"Sunset Glow"	3	Next Steps

Solo

- The Fire Cadenza (Infinita Records, 2009)
- Santa Ana Wind (Infinita Records, 2009)
- Locomotion (Infinita Records, 2012)
- Segovia Thru the Snow (Infinita Records, 2022)
- The Calling (Infinita Records, 2022)
- The Eternal Dance (Infinita Records, 2023)
- Sunlight Bossa Nova (Infinita Records, 2023)
- Spring Awakens (Infinita Records, 2025)
- Jubilation (Infinita Records, 2025)
- Speed of Life (Infinita Records, 2025)

Collaborations

- Idan Raichel & Lawson Rollins: And If You Will Come To Me (Cumbancha Records, 2018)
- Idan Raichel & Lawson Rollins: And If You Will Come To Me [Acoustic Version] (Cumbancha Records, 2018)

=== Compilation appearances ===
Solo

- Guitar Greats: The Best of New Flamenco – Volume I (2000) (Baja/TSR)
- Gypsy Spice: Best of New Flamenco (2009) (Baja/TSR)
- Guitar Greats: The Best of New Flamenco – Volume III (2013) (Baja/TSR)

As part of Young & Rollins

- Tabu: Mondo Flamenco (2001) (Narada)
- Musica del Sol (2001) (Williams Sonoma/EMI-Capitol)
- Guitar Greats: The Best of New Flamenco – Volume II (2002) (Baja/TSR)
- Caravan: Passion and Magic (2005) (Sugo)
- Bolero Gypsies: New Flamenco – Volume I (2005) (Bolero)
- Bolero Gypsies: New Flamenco – Volume II (2006) (Bolero)

== Awards ==
- USA Songwriting Competition – 2015, 1st Place Instrumental
- Global Music Awards – 2015, three gold medals: Instrumentalist, Album & Top 10 Albums of the Year
- USA Songwriting Competition – 2014, 1st Place Instrumental; 3rd Overall Best Artist
- International Songwriting Competition – 2015, Finalist Instrumental

== See also ==
- New Flamenco
- Flamenco rumba
- Young & Rollins
