= Sunshine, Joy & Happiness: A Tragic Tale of Death, Despair and Other Silly Nonsense =

Studio album by Get Set Go
- Released: January 22, 2008
- Studio: Stanley Recordings, Santa Monica
- Genre: Indie rock, alternative rock
- Length: 61:09
- Label: TSR Records
- Producer: John Would; Michael Torres

Get Set Go chronology
| Selling Out & Going Home (2007) | Sunshine, Joy & Happiness: A Tragic Tale of Death, Despair and Other Silly Nonsense (2008) | Fury of Your Lonely Heart (2011) |

Professional ratings
Review scores
| Source | Rating |
|---|---|
| AllMusic | 3/5 stars |

Sunshine, Joy, & Happiness: A Tragic Tale of Death, Despair, and Other Silly Nonsense (sometimes shortened to just Sunshine, Joy, & Happiness) is the fourth studio album by American indie rock group Get Set Go, released on January 22, 2008 through TSR Records. The album is the last by the group to feature guitarist Jim Daley, as well as the group's last recording released through TSR. After the release of this album, the group would continue to release music digitally through their own independently operated Square Tires Music label.

The CD edition of the album includes a DVD that contains a 25-minute compilation of tour footage and interviews of the band members explaining the tracks of the album.

== Track listing ==
| No. | Title | Length |
|---|---|---|
| 1. | "How Now" | 3:12 |
| 2. | "Gotta Getta Job" | 3:11 |
| 3. | "Hell On Earth" | 3:50 |
| 4. | "Please Destroy Me" | 3:27 |
| 5. | "Crazy Over You" | 3:28 |
| 6. | "You'll Look Beautiful As You Burn" | 3:02 |
| 7. | "I'll Come Around" | 4:03 |
| 8. | "Modern Age" | 3:05 |
| 9. | "Jesus Christ In Reverse" | 3:45 |
| 10. | "A Heat That Kills" | 2:49 |
| 11. | "The Trouble With Being Poor" | 4:10 |
| 12. | "Sunshine, Joy, and Happiness" | 4:11 |
| 13. | "This Song Is Not About You" | 3:43 |
| 14. | "Cannibalism Is the Cure" | 3:38 |
| 15. | "O'My Lord" | 3:09 |
| 16. | "Give Me Strength" | 3:15 |
| 17. | "The Great Indie Rock Swindle" | 5:31 |

== Personnel ==
Adapted from the Sunshine, Joy, & Happiness liner notes.

- Michael "Mike TV" Torres – guitar, vocals, production
- Jim Daley – guitar
- Colin Schlitte – bass
- Eric Summer – viola
- Mike Summer – fiddle
- Dave Palamaro – drums, video editing
- Ryan "Schmed" Mayen – keyboards, percussion
- John Would – slide guitar, production, mixing, recording
- David J. Hay Chapman – art direction, design
