= Ordinary World =

Ordinary World may refer to:

- Ordinary world, the situation of normality where the "hero's journey" starts and ends

== Music ==
- Ordinary World (album), by Get Set Go

=== Songs ===
- "Ordinary World" (song), by Duran Duran, from the album Duran Duran (The Wedding Album), covered by Joy Williams, Red, Aurora, and other artists
- "Ordinary World", by Green Day, from the album Revolution Radio

== Other uses ==
- Ordinary World (novel), 1986
- Ordinary World (film), 2016
