= Get Set Go =

US musical group

- Origin: Highland Park, Los Angeles, California
- Genres: Indie rock, pop-punk, alternative rock
- Years active: 2002–present
- Labels: Square Tire Music, TSR Records
- Members: Michael Torres
- Past members: Eric Summer; Dave Palamaro; Jeremy Keeler; Rick Vegas; Patrick Flores; Amy Wood; Sean Spillane; Jim Daley; Colin Schlitt; Shawn Malone; Nate Greeley
- Website: getsetgomusic.com

Get Set Go is a band formed in 2002 in Highland Park, Los Angeles, California. They are generally seen as indie rock. Their main songwriter is Michael "Mike TV" Torres. The band is known for their tendency to mix dark lyrics with upbeat or catchy melodies. Their songs have been featured on several episodes of Grey's Anatomy, appearing on the first two volumes of the series' soundtrack with the tracks "Wait" and an amended version of "I Hate Everyone."

Originally called Vermicious K, the band went through a few name changes and lineups before settling on Get Set Go. Currently, Get Set Go is the solo project of Michael Torres.

== History ==
Michael Torres initially started Get Set Go with high school friend Patrick Flores in 2002 in Highland Park, Los Angeles. The two originally recorded joke albums under the nicknames "Mike TV" and "Dr. Modo", respectively. The duo soon met drummer Amy Wood (later of The Dollyrots) and began producing music under the name Vermicious K, performing regularly at the Highland Park venue Mr. T's Bowl. They later changed to the band name to All Your Base Are Belong To Us (a reference to the internet joke). Later that same year the trio recorded a 3-track demo with the help of Ben Vaughn and, eventually, were signed to TSR Records, a small family-owned independent label that "thought [they] had a lot of commercial appeal". The group once again changed their name, this time to Get Set Go, and released their debut album So You've Ruined Your Life in 2003.

Although the group toured nationally to promote the album, they faced a lack of success, and both Wood and Flores left to pursue other careers. Torres fell into a state of depression afterwards, and by 2004, was addicted to heroin. By 2005, Torres was able to quit and gain new members for Get Set Go, including violist Eric Summer. During this time, crew members of the show Grey's Anatomy heard about the group, and tracks by the band were included on the shows soundtrack, most notably the track "Wait" from So You've Ruined Your Life. In 2006, Ordinary World was released. Later that year, the Ordinary World track "Die, Motherfucker Die" was featured in an episode of the show Weeds. The albums Selling Out & Going Home (2007) and Sunshine, Joy & Happiness: A Tragic Tale of Death, Despair and Other Silly Nonsense (2008) followed. Like with So You've Ruined Your Life, these albums faced a lack of commercial success despite constant touring.

The group left TSR Records in 2009 and subsequently established their own independent label, Square Tire Music, in 2011 in order to release their music, as well as music made by others. A Kickstarter campaign was launched to help fund the production of the band's fifth album, Fury of Your Lonely Heart, which was eventually released digitally on September 20, 2011. Two extended plays, Loose Tongues... and Wicked Hands followed in 2011 and 2012, respectively. Tumors, composed of material written during the Loose Tongues... era, was released as the band's sixth full-length in 2013. In May 2014, Get Set Go became the solo project of Michael Torres when he moved to Austin, Texas.

== Members ==
Current members

- Michael "Mike TV" Torres – vocals, guitar, piano, bass, percussion, samples (2002–present)

Former members

- Eric Summer – viola, vocals (2005-2014)
- Dave Palamaro – drums (2005-2014)
- Shawn Malone – guitar, vocals (2013-2014)
- Jeremy Keeler – bass, vocals (2010-2014)
- Colin Schlitt – bass, vocals (2006-2010)
- Jim Daley – guitar, vocals (2005-2009)
- Patrick "Dr. Modo" Flores – bass (2002-2004)
- Amy Wood – drums (2002-2004)

Session and live musicians

- Nate Greeley – guitar, vocals
- John Would – bass, guitar
- Ryan "Schmed" Maynes – keyboards, guitars, vocals
- Rick Vegas – drums
- Sean Spillane – guitar, vocals

Timeline

== Hesitation Cuts Podcast ==
In mid-2022, Torres launched the "Hesitation Cuts" podcast. Episodes feature storytelling from Torres' life and music, as well as exclusive, new recordings of previously published songs and unreleased music around the episode's theme. Episodes are released monthly.

== Discography ==
=== Studio albums ===
- So You've Ruined Your Life (2003)
- Ordinary World (2006)
- Selling Out & Going Home (2007)
- Sunshine, Joy & Happiness: A Tragic Tale of Death, Despair and Other Silly Nonsense (2008)
- Fury of Your Lonely Heart (2011)
- Tumors (2013)
- Television & Summer (2013)
- The Pleasure of Being Sad (2014)
- Here Be Dragons (2015)
- True Crime Television (2015)
- Death & Taxes. Mostly Taxes (2016)
- This Is Why We Can't Have Nice Things (2017)
- Hesitation Cuts (2019)
- #dinosore (2022)
- Juggernaut (2023)
- Outworlder (2023)
- Precious Mettle (2023)
- Dynamite! (2023)
- Tiny Songs for Tiny People (2024)
- This is the No School Sound (2024)
- Forgetting Things Done (2024)
- Fine (2024)
- Machine Empathy (2024)
- Pre-Shattered Glass (2025)
- Microdosing (2025)
- Hard Mode (2025)
- All I Got (Just Ain't Enough) (2025)
- Just Too Much (2026)

=== Extended plays ===
- Loose Tongues... (2011)
- Wicked Hands (2012)

=== Compilation albums ===
- Furthermore (2013-2014 Outtakes, Demos, and B-Sides) (2015)

=== Live albums ===
- MikeTVLive Volume 1 (2018)
- MikeTVLive Volume 2 (2018)
- MikeTVLive Volume 3 (2018)
- Get Set Go Does Get Set Go (2020)
