= Elevation (disambiguation) =

Elevation is the height of a geographic location above a fixed reference point.

Elevation may also refer to:

== Math and science ==
- Elevation (ballistics), the angle between a weapon barrel and the horizontal plane
- Elevation (astronomy), one component of the horizontal coordinate system
- Elevation (view), used in architectural drawing to represent a building facade
- Elevation (kinesiology), an anatomical term of motion
- Elevation (emotion)
- Elevation, a type of semantic change in linguistics

== Music ==
- "Elevation" (song), by U2
- "Elevation", a song by the American band Television from the album Marquee Moon
- "Elevation", a song by Zion I from the album Mind Over Matter
- "Elevation", a Dutch trance song composed by Jack Molenschot
- "Elevation", a jazz song written by Gerry Mulligan and recorded by Elliot Lawrence
- Elevation (Yonder Mountain String Band album), 1999
- Elevation (Anggun album), 2008
- Elevation (Black Eyed Peas album), 2022
- Elevation (Pharoah Sanders album), 1974
- Elevation (Lawson Rollins album), 2011
- "Elevation", a pop song by English band Erasure, 2014

== Other uses ==
- Elevation, New Zealand, a locality in the Marlborough District
- Elevation (liturgy), the lifting of consecrated bread and wine in Mass
- Elevation (novella), a 2018 novella by Stephen King
- Elevation, or privilege escalation, use of a computer security exploit to access protected information or functions
- AEW Dark: Elevation, professional wrestling web television program
- Elevation (emotion), an emotion elicited by witnessing acts of moral goodness
- Elevation (film), an American post-apocalyptic action thriller film
- Elevation to the peerage
- Help:Elevation, a guide to using wikitext to display elevation

== See also ==
- Elevated (disambiguation)
- Elevator (disambiguation)
