= Selling Out & Going Home =

Studio album by Get Set Go
- Released: January 23, 2007
- Recorded: June 2006
- Studio: Stanley Recordings, Los Angeles
- Genre: Indie rock, alternative rock
- Length: 58:17
- Label: TSR Records
- Producer: John Would; Michael Torres

Get Set Go chronology
Ordinary World (2006)	Selling Out & Going Home (2007)	Sunshine, Joy & Happiness: A Tragic Tale of Death, Despair and Other Silly Nonsense (2008)

Professional ratings
Review scores
Source	Rating
AllMusic	4/5 stars
PopMatters	7/10 stars
The Red Alert	(positive)

Selling Out & Going Home is the third studio album by American indie rock band Get Set Go, released on January 23, 2007, on TSR Records. The album, released only a year after its predecessor Ordinary World, was recorded, mixed, and mastered at Stanley Recordings in June 2006. It's also the first album by the group to feature guitarist Jim Daley, who joined the group soon after production for Ordinary World ended.

== Track listing ==
All tracks are written by Mike TV.

No.	Title	Length
1.	"It's Alright"	3:04
2.	"Sweet Little Kisses"	3:14
3.	"I'll Be Your Heroin"	4:00
4.	"I'm A Goner"	3:01
5.	"It Must Be Love"	3:15
6.	"The Law of Diminishing Returns"	4:05
7.	"Tighten the Verses"	4:04
8.	"Nothing Keeps Us Apart"	3:15
9.	"You're Gonna Die Alone"	3:09
10.	"Everybody Get Movin'"	3:16
11.	"Thirteen"	4:35
12.	"5th & Spring"	2:40
13.	"Get What's Coming To You"	2:13
14.	"Crime & Heresy"	3:22
15.	"Fuck You (I Want To)"	3:17
16.	"You're the Infection"	3:45
17.	"Nothing Turns Me On"	4:05
Total length:		58:17

== Personnel ==
Adapted from the Selling Out & Going Home liner notes.

- Michael "Mike TV" Torres – guitar, vocals, production
- Jim Daley – guitar
- Colin Schlitt – bass
- Eric Summer – viola
- Dava Palamaro – drums
- John Would – production, recording, mixing, mastering
- Dylan J. Hay Chapman – art direction, photography
