= Espirito =

Studio album by Lawson Rollins
- Released: 2010
- Genre: Flamenco, Latin jazz

Lawson Rollins chronology
Infinita (2008)	Espirito (2010)	Elevation (2011)

Espirito (Brazilian for "Spirit") is the second album by Lawson Rollins. Rollins composed all of the music and co-produced the album with Persian-American musician and producer Shahin Shahida (of Shahin & Sepehr) and multi-platinum producer Dominic Camardella (Flora Purim, 3rd Force, Ottmar Liebert). The cast of musicians includes the Grammy-nominated Brazilian singer Flora Purim, percussionist Airto Moreira, Iranian kamancheh player Kayhan Kalhor (of the Silk Road Ensemble), and Grammy winners Charlie Bisharat on violin as well as Cuban drummer Horacio Hernandez.

The songs "Moonlight Samba" and "Havana Heat" from "Espirito" landed on the Billboard jazz chart.

Espirito met with positive reviews from jazz and world music critics.

== Track listing ==
1. Rumba del Sol 4:33
2. Moonlight Samba 5:38
3. Havana Heat 4:16
4. Café La Martinique 6:09
5. Return to Rio 4:50
6. Blue Mountain Bolero 4:38
7. Santa Lucia Waltz 4:32
8. Espirito 5:45
9. Cape Town Sky 6:04
10. Footprints 2:28
11. Migration 6:46
12. Shadowland 6:35
13. Into the Light 4:20
- Total time: 66:40

== Web Sources ==
- The All Music Guide
