= Luis Villegas =

American guitarist (born 1969)

- Born: July 28, 1969 (age 55); East Los Angeles, California, U.S.
- Genres: Jazz, Latin, world, new-age
- Occupation(s): Musician, guitarist, songwriter
- Instrument(s): Guitar, Vocals
- Years active: 1996–present
- Labels: Domo Records, Baja/TSR Records, Tenure Records
- Website: www.luisvillegas.com

Luis Villegas (born July 28, 1969) is an American guitarist who released an album called Cafe Olé in 1996, which was nominated for the Best New Album award at the 41st Annual Grammy Awards in 1999. Villegas's style combines new-age music, flamenco, and jazz. He is known for using a technique of playing fast, intricate lines by using the fingernail of his right index finger in place of a guitar pick. He also had a small role as a member of a band in the film Collateral starring Tom Cruise and Jamie Foxx. He is currently a member of the group Heavy Mellow, along with founder Benjamin Woods and percussionist Mike Bennett.

== Early life ==
Luis Villegas is a first-generation Mexican-American born in East Los Angeles, California, U.S. He grew up listening to traditional Mexican Ranchero music and taught himself to play guitar in the flamenco, jazz, rock, blues and classical genres. As a boy, he met the Mexican Ranchero singer, Vicente Fernandez. However, it was rock music that attracted him (rather than traditional Mexican music), because the heavy metal explosion was in full swing in Los Angeles.

== Career ==
=== Early years ===
Villegas played in rock bands all through High School and into college, receiving some mild success with the band Slumlord in 1988 and 1989 (fronted by Scott Kidd who later went on to become a famous radio DJ known as Uncle Scotty). Luis quit Slumlord in 1990 when he found he needed a different musical stimulus.

=== Experimental years ===
After leaving Slumlord, Villegas began playing the acoustic guitar and experimenting with classical, jazz, and even flamenco music. Being self-taught, he emulated guitarists from the records he listened to like Wes Montgomery, Paco De Lucia, and Al Di Meola among others. Many of his current techniques are based on flamenco guitar techniques such as rasgueado, alzapua and picado. In 1991, he recorded a demo of original material in a style that was very new to American audiences. This new style was being made popular at the time by artists such as The Gipsy Kings, and Strunz and Farah.

Luis then formed a band to play some of this new material. The band, which originally consisted of friends from rock bands he had previously played with, formed a huge following in the Los Angeles area.

=== Café Ole ===
In 1996, Villegas recorded and released his first CD independently entitled Café Ole, produced by David Scheffler and Guillermo Guzman. Members of his band as well as studio musicians, Gregg Bissonette, Abraham Laboriel, and The Rippingtons' Steve Reid, among others lent their talents to the CD. Less than a year later, Luis signed his first recording contract with Domo Records, and affiliate of EMI records. In 1999, Café Ole was re-released by Domo/EMI records with a new cover and some newly recorded songs in 1998. The album earned a Grammy nomination for Best New Age Album in 1999.

Villegas released his second album, Spanish Kiss, through Baja/TSR records in 2000. He also appeared on various compilation CDs during the following two years. Guitarists worldwide took notice when Villegas' name appeared alongside guitar icons such as Al Di Meola, Steve Morse, Ottmar Liebert, Jesse Cook and Strunz & Farah.

Casa Villegas (Baja/TSR), his third CD, was released in 2003 and marked Luis' debut as a producer as well as performer. It stayed on the SmoothJazz.com charts for six weeks after its release on the strength of the single "Whittier Blvd.".

Villegas was asked by his label, Baja/TSR, to create a Christmas album. After working on it for some time, negotiations for producing the album fell through and Luis subsequently left the label to pursue his career as an independent artist. The Christmas album, Guitarras de Navidad found its way to his fans anyway. Then, in 2007, the album was updated with several additional songs and a new cover and licensed to the Tenure label, under the guidance of Juan Carlos Quintero. It was released in August for the 2007 holiday season.

In 2001, Villegas recorded a duet with classical guitarist Liona Boyd, which was nominated for a Juno Award (the Canadian Grammy). In 2003, he performed with Nuevo Flamenco guitarist Jesse Cook, and performed for Carmen Electra and Dave Navarro's much-publicized wedding on MTV in 2004. Villegas has also worked with Janet Jackson, Marc Anthony, and Plácido Domingo.

In December, 2004 the Luis Villegas Official Fan Club was formed, and the members continue to fully support Luis’ music.

On December 21, 2007, Luis was featured in an interview with Val Zavala and performed with several of his band members on the PBS television show "Life and Times."

=== Heavy Mellow ===
Luis is currently performing in a flamenco trio called Heavy Mellow, founded by Los Angeles flamenco guitarist Benjamin Woods. Heavy Mellow performs heavy metal songs by the likes of Iron Maiden, Judas Priest, Black Sabbath, Ozzy Osbourne and others, but in a style of two flamenco guitars and a cajon player. They performed music cruises such as The Monsters of Rock, The Moody Blues Cruise and YES Cruise to the Edge. Heavy Mellow have one self-titled album released in 2013.

== Personal life ==
Luis resides in Los Angeles, CA with his wife, Gloria, and two children Christian and Krista. He is currently teaching guitar at Santa Monica High School as adjunct faculty for Santa Monica College and flamenco guitar at Orange County High School of the Arts as part of its Instrumental Music Conservatory.

== Discography ==
=== Albums ===
- Cafe Olé (1998) Nominated for a Grammy Award for Best New Age Album
- Spanish Kiss (2000)
- Casa Villegas (2003)
- Guitarras De Navidad (2007)
- Eastside Democracy (2016)

=== Singles ===
- Eastside (2013)
- Rainbow in the Dark (2016)
- Can’t Take My Eyes Off You (2021)
- Vente Pa Madrid (2021)
- Breathe (2021)
- Cuban Breeze (2021)

=== Other compilation appearances ===
- Music for the Spirit, Volume 2 (1999) (Domo Records)
- Guitar Greats: The Best of New Flamenco - Volume I (2000) (Baja/TSR Records)
- Music for the Spirit, Volume 3 (2001) (Domo Records)
- Tabu: Mondo Flamenco (2001) (Narada)
- Journey to the Heart IV: Music for Massage (2002) (Domo Records)
- Camino Latino / Latin Journey - Liona Maria Boyd (2002) (Moston)
- Guitar Greats: The Best of New Flamenco - Volume II (2002) (Baja/TSR Records)
- Barcelona: Music Celebrating the Flavors of the World (2004) (Williams Sonoma)
- Gypsy Spice: Best Of New Flamenco (2009) (Baja/TSR Records)
- The World Of The Spanish Guitar Vol. 1 (2011) (Higher Octave Music)
- Guitar Greats: The Best of New Flamenco - Volume III (2013) (Baja/TSR Records)

== Musicians ==
Luis has performed with many artists, such as:

- Jackson Browne: singer/guitarist
- Abraham Laboriel: bass
- Alberto Salas: piano
- Gregg Bissonette: drums
- David Garfield: piano
- Carlos Rodriguez: piano
- Jose Garcia: guitar/vocals
- Juan Carlos Portillo: bass
- Rene Camacho: bass
- Chris Trujillo: percussion
- Ramon Yslas: percussion
- Jorge Villanueva: percussion
- Pablo Correa: drums
- Paul Tchounga: drums
- Andy Abad: guitar
- Guillermo Guzman: bass
- Luis Perez: percussion
- Joey Heredia: drums
- Ricardo “Tiki” Pasillas: drums
- Michito Sanchez: perc
- Rique Pantoja: piano
- Charlie Bisharat: violin
- Steve Reid: percussion
- Arturo Solar: trumpet
- Garret Smith: trombone
- Carlos Cuevas: piano
- Fausto Cuevas: percussion
- Ronnie Gutierrez: percussion
- Ricky Adorno: bass
- Scott Vomvolakis: perc
- Keith Dasalla: perc
- Rene Castro: percussion
- Jesse Stern: bass
- Cassio Duarte: percussion

== See also ==
- New Flamenco
- Flamenco rumba
