= The Living Sea (soundtrack) =

The Living Sea: Soundtrack from the IMAX Film

Soundtrack album by Sting
- Released: May 23, 1995
- Recorded: 1995
- Genre: Pop, new-age
- Length: 51:52
- Label: A&M
- Producer: Hugh Padgham; Sting; Neil Dorfsman; Kim Turner; Steve Wood; Darryl Way

Sting chronology
Ten Summoner's Tales (1993)	The Living Sea: Soundtrack from the IMAX Film (1995)	Mercury Falling (1996)

The Living Sea: Soundtrack from the IMAX Film is the soundtrack album accompanying the IMAX film The Living Sea. The album was recorded by Sting and Steve Wood. It features several songs previously released by Sting, as well as new compositions by Sting and Wood.

It also features the guitar duo Strunz & Farah, as session musicians.

== Track listing ==
All songs written by Sting, except as noted.

No.	Title	Writer(s)	Length
1.	"Fragile"		3:24
2.	"Why Should I Cry for You?"		2:57
3.	"Cool Breeze"		3:48
4.	"Mad About You"		6:18
5.	"Ocean Waltz"		3:08
6.	"One World (Not Three) / Love Is the Seventh Wave"		4:45
7.	"Why Should I Cry for You?"		6:31
8.	"Saint Agnes and the Burning Train"		2:43
9.	"Tides"		3:08
10.	"Why Should I Cry for You?"		6:58
11.	"Arrival"	Steve Wood	1:40
12.	"Jellyfish Lake"	Steve Wood	3:01
13.	"Fragile (Reprise)"		3:53

== Credits ==
- Sting – performer
- Alan Deremo – bass guitar
- Tim Landers – bass guitar
- Ardeshir Farah – guitars
- Michael Hamilton – guitars
- Jorge Strunz – guitars
- Brent Lewis – ikauma drums
- Nate Wood – drums
- Daniel May – orchestration
- Kevin Ricard – percussion
- Michito Sanchez – percussion
- Marc Russo – saxophone
- Beth Wood – voices
- Steve Wood – synthesizer, voices
