= Elevator (disambiguation) =

An elevator (also called a lift) is a device for the vertical movement of goods or people, typically within a building.

It may also refer to:

== Movement of things ==
- Elevators (drilling rig), a device used for lifting the drill string on a drilling rig
- Elevator (aeronautics), a control surface of an airplane used to control its attitude in pitch
- Grain elevator, a structure for storing grain safely above ground level
- Elevator (dental), a tool used in dental extractions to loosen teeth
- Boat lift, sometimes called a boat elevator
- Canal inclined plane, sometimes called a canal elevator
- Bucket elevator, also called a grain leg, a mechanism for hauling flowable bulk materials vertically
- Surgical elevator, a tool for positioning bones or tissue.

== Music ==
- Elevator (band), a Canadian band
- Elevator (The Rollers album), 1979
- Elevator (Hot Hot Heat album), 2005
- Elevator, a 1999 album by Titan
- Elevator, a 2007 album by Room 2012
- Elevator (EP), released in 2001 by Epicure
- "Elevator" (Eminem song), 2009
- "Elevator" (Flo Rida song), 2008
- "Elevators (Me & You)", a 1996 song by OutKast from their album ATLiens
- "Elevator", a song by Burning Brides from their 2001 album Fall of the Plastic Empire
- "Elevator", a song by Box Car Racer from the 2001 album Box Car Racer
- "Elevator", a song by David Archuleta from the album The Other Side of Down
- "Elevator", a song by the Pussycat Dolls from their 2008 album Doll Domination
- "Elevator", a song by Hawk Nelson from their 2013 album Made
- "Elevator", a song by Edan Lui
- "The Elevator", a song by Lizzy McAlpine from her 2024 album Older
- "Elevators", a song by Gabi DeMartino from Paintings of Me

== Film and television ==
- The Elevator (1974 film), a film directed by Jerry Jameson
- "The Elevator" (The Twilight Zone), a 1986 television episode
- "Elevator (Space Ghost Coast to Coast)", an episode of Space Ghost Coast to Coast
- Elevator (1995 film), a 1995 Iranian film
- The Elevator, a 2001 film featuring Greg Lauren
- Elevator (2008 film), an independent 2008 Romanian film
- Elevator (2011 film), a film directed by Stig Svendsen
- Elevator (2024 film), a Filipino film directed by Philip King featuring Paulo Avelino and Kylie Verzosa

== Other uses ==
- The Elevator (newspaper), a historic Black owned newspaper based in San Francisco
- The Elevator, a 1993 collection of stories by William Sleator
- Elevators (computer game), computer game included in 1982 Beagle Bag package
- Elevator Gallery, an art venue in east London
- Elevator Competition, an event for MBA students put on by the Babcock Graduate School of Management
- Elevator, a type of gag bit for horses
- The bar or thumb on a scrollbar in computing

== See also ==
- Elevation (disambiguation)
- Elevator music
- Elevator paradox
- Elevator pitch
- Elevator shoe
- Elevator algorithm
- Space elevator
