= So You've Ruined Your Life =

Studio album by Get Set Go
- Released: September 30, 2003
- Recorded: April–May, 2003
- Studios: Stanley Recordings, Los Angeles; Mad Dog Studios, Burbank
- Genre: Pop-punk
- Length: 46:50
- Label: TSR Records
- Producers: Ben Vaughn; Get Set Go

Get Set Go chronology
So You've Ruined Your Life (2003)	Ordinary World (2006)

Professional ratings
Review scores
Source	Rating
AllMusic	3.5/5 stars
CMJ	(favorable)

So You've Ruined Your Life is the debut studio album by American band Get Set Go, released on September 30, 2003 through TSR Records. The album displays the band's early pop-punk sound, and is the only album to feature founding members Patrick Flores and Amy Woods in its entirety. The hidden track, "Wait", has been used in the TV series Grey's Anatomy and has been used in the first volume of the series soundtrack.

== Background and recording ==
The band formed in 2002, originally under the name Vermicious K, then later on as All Your Bass Are Belong To Us, then finally as Get Set Go. After recording a 3-track demo with Ben Vaughn, the group gained the attention of the independent family-operated label TSR Records and were signed. The group then proceeded to work on their debut full-length in the spring of 2003, again hiring Vaughn to help with production. The group first recorded the drum and bass tracks at Stanley Recordings before going to Mad Dog Studios to record the vocals and guitars. The entire album was mixed at MT Studios, Burbank and finally mastered at Bernie Grundman Studios. The entire album took around 3 months to complete.

The artwork for the album was done by artist Dave Johnson, who later did the cover art for the band's 2011 album Fury of Your Lonely Heart.

== Critical reception ==
While not reviewed by many since its release, the attention the album did receive was positive. Brad Filicky of CMJ Magazine gave the album a positive review, stating "So You've Ruined Your Life proves that this is a group ready for its close-up and is bound to get the respect that it deserves".

== Commercial performance ==
Despite the fact that the band did a national tour to promote the album, So You've Ruined Your Life failed to reach any sort of commercial success. By 2004, both Flores and Woods left the group to pursue other careers. Guitarist and vocalist Michael Torres would later fall into a state of depression and drug addiction, which eventually resulted in him getting sober and continuing Get Set Go with a revolving door of new members.

== Track listing ==
All tracks are written by Mike TV.

No.	Title	Length
1.	"Twenty-One"	3:47
2.	"Jesus Christ Wore Leather"	2:47
3.	"Kiss the Girl"	3:51
4.	"I Want You"	3:21
5.	"One With the Numbers"	3:27
6.	"Go to the Mattress"	3:09
7.	"Girl Is Sleeping"	3:42
8.	"Break Your Heart"	2:56
9.	"VKFD (The Fire Truck Song)"	2:34
10.	"Lonely World"	3:21
11.	"War"	3:19
12.	"She Goes Round"	2:36
13.	"What I Love About You"	4:48
14.	"Wait" (Unlisted Track)	2:46
Total length:		46:50

== Personnel ==
Adapted from the So You've Ruined Your Life liner notes.

Get Set Go

- Michael "Mike TV" Torres – guitar, vocals
- Patrick "Dr. Modo" Flores – bass, vocals
- Amy Wood – drums

Additional musicians

- Ryan "Schmedly" Mayen – backing vocals, keyboards, guitars, tambourine
- John DeBaun – backing vocals
- Sean Spillane – backing vocals
- Benjamine Chadwick – backing vocals
- Nate Greeley – backing vocals

Production and design

- Ben Vaughn – production
- John Would – recording
- John DeBaun – recording
- Matt Thorne – mixing
- Bernie Grundman – mastering
- Brian Ewing – layout, design
- Peter Mars – layout, design
- Dave Johnson – artwork
