= Mistico (disambiguation) =

Místico (born 1982) is the ring name of Mexican luchador Luis Urive, also known as Sin Cara in WWE.

Mistico may also refer to:

- Cinta de Oro (born 1977), American wrestler also known by the ring name Místico or Mystico
- Dralístico (born 1992), Mexican wrestler also known by the ring name Místico or Místico II
- Mistico (boat), type of large sailing coaster used by Greek pirates in the Mediterranean in the 18th and 19th centuries
- Mistico, a 2007 album by American jazz musician Charlie Hunter
- Mistico, a 2009 album by Canadian guitarist Johannes Linstead
