= Lara & Reyes (album) =

Studio album by Lara & Reyes
- Released: September 6, 2006
- Recorded: unknown
- Genre: New Flamenco, Latin jazz, world music
- Length: 46:06
- Label: Fusion Acustica Music
- Producer: unknown

Lara & Reyes chronology
| World Jazz (2000) | Lara & Reyes (2006) |

Lara & Reyes was the seventh album released by the flamenco-influenced Latin guitar instrumental duo Lara & Reyes. This album won an Indie Acoustic Project Award in 2007 in the category of "Best Latin Album".

== Track listing ==
1. "Oh, Shake it" – 3:54
2. "Shoreline Horses" – 6:40
3. "Le Gret" – 3:38
4. "Saloon Rag" – 1:04
5. "Flamgrass" – 6:40
6. "Old Wolf" – 6:15
7. "Cat Cy" – 4:29
8. "Possum Blues" – 2:02
9. "Miss So & So" – 3:32
10. "Waltz 45" – 6:07
11. "Lonesome Mandolin" – 1:45
