= Strunz & Farah =

Guitar duo

- Origin: Los Angeles, California, United States
- Genres: World, Jazz, Latin, Instrumental
- Years active: 1979–present
- Labels: Selva, Milestone, AudioQuest, Mesa
- Members: Jorge Strunz; Ardeshir Farah
- Website: www.strunzandfarah.com

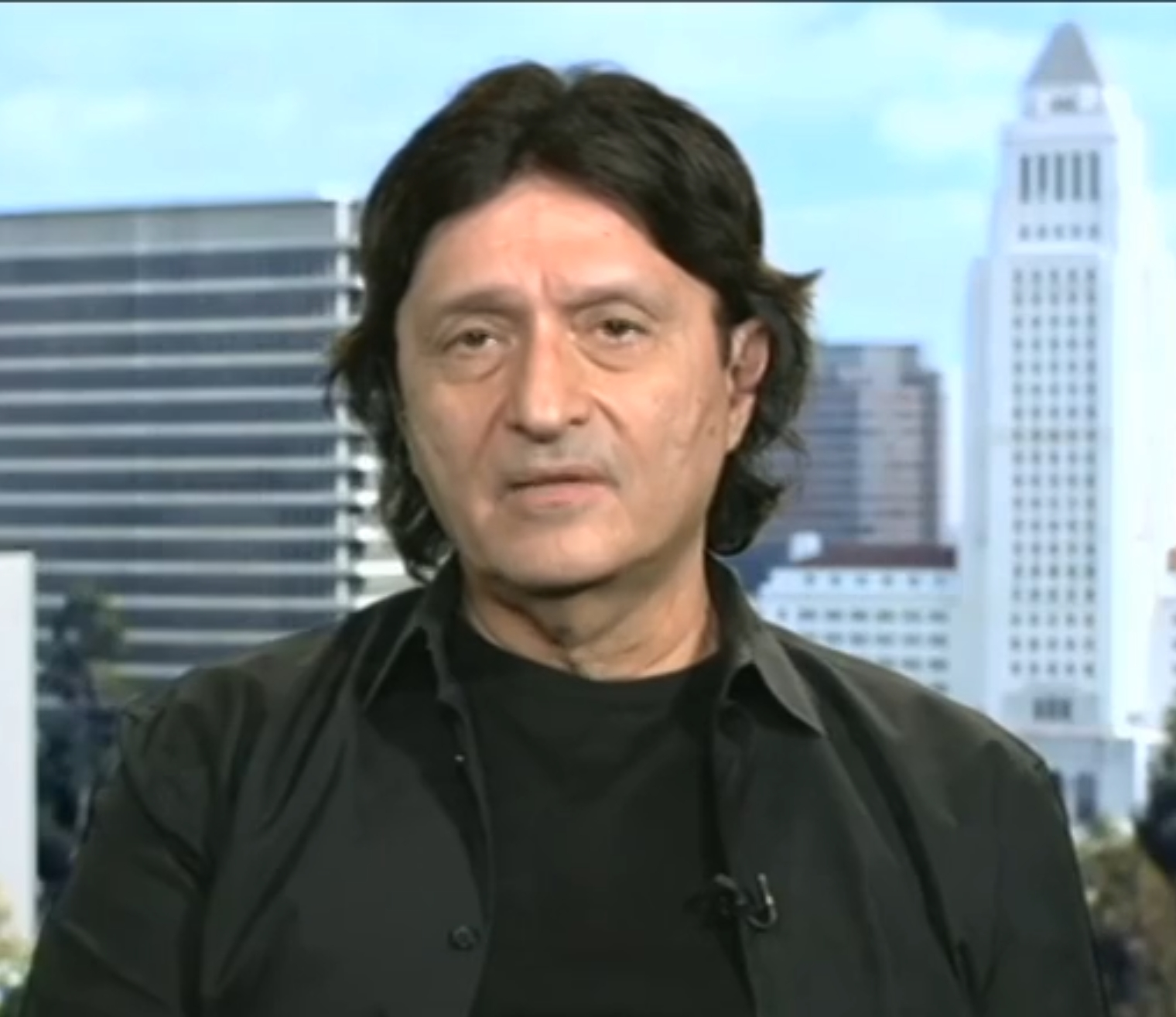
Ardeshir Farah on VOA

Strunz & Farah is a guitar duo with an eclectic sound that has been described as a cross between world jazz and other influences, especially Latin jazz, Latin folk music, and Middle Eastern.

== Music career ==
Jorge Strunz, born in Costa Rica, and Ardeshir Farah, hailing from Iran, met in the United States in 1979. Jorge Strunz was one of the founders of the Latin jazz band Caldera. Caldera combined jazz, funk and rock with a wide variety of Latin music, influenced by 1970s fusion explorers like John McLaughlin, Return to Forever and Weather Report. After four albums, the band separated in 1979 (though three out of their four albums have been reissued on CD and digital except for their third album Time & Chance).

Having both played guitar professionally since their early teens, Strunz and Iranian guitarist Ardeshir Farah met in Los Angeles and released their first album, Mosaico, in 1982, which they produced and released on L. Subramaniam's label Ganesh Records. Later they started their own label, Selva Records. They soon caught the attention of Richard Bock, an important figure in jazz radio, who helped the duo land a contract with the jazz label Milestone, for whom they recorded two albums, Fonteria (1984), and Guitarras (1986). Their next album Misterio was released in 1989 under the Water Lily Acoustics label. The duo then signed with the Mesa/Bluemoon Recordings label, and released Primal Magic (1990), and Américas (1992). The album cover for Primal Magic features artwork of a fully nude woman in the jungle surrounded by animals, and with her right breast and backside uncensored; the artwork was done by Kathlyn Powell.

As a musical duo, Strunz & Farah drew upon their collective musical influences, such as Paco de Lucía, Sabicas, Chick Corea and Persian classical music to create a unique sound that incorporates elements of Flamenco, Persian rhythms and Jazz. Strunz & Farah have since released nineteen recordings together, several albums as a duo and collaborating with Rubén Blades (Joseph and His Brothers BMG, 1993), Luis Conte (percussion on their debut album, Mosaico) and with L. Subramaniam on two tracks ("Confluence" and "Shadow of Heaven") on their debut recording, Mosaico. Throughout their career, Strunz & Farah have collaborated with a number of other artists, combining a variety of musical traditions through their work. Past collaborators include Manoochehr Sadeghi on their second studio album, Frontera, Hayedeh on their third studio album, Guitarras, Humberto "Nengue" Hernandez on their ninth studio album, Wild Muse, and Keyavash Nourai and Diego "El Negro" Alvarez on their latest studio album, Tales of Two Guitars.

The duo also worked with Sting on the album The Living Sea: Soundtrack from the IMAX Film as session musicians. Their latest album, Syncretic Strings, was released on March 2, 2023.

== Discography ==
=== Studio albums ===
- Mosaico (1982)
- Frontera (1984)
- Guitarras (1985)
- Misterio (1989)
- Primal Magic (1990)
- Américas (1992)
- Heat of the Sun (1995)
- Live (1997)
- Wild Muse (1998)
- The Best of Strunz & Farah (2000)
- Stringweave (2001)
- Strunz & Farah in Performance (2003); DVD
- Rio de Colores (2003)
- Zona Tórrida (2005)
- Desert Guitars (2005)
- Jungle Guitars (2006)
- Fantaseo (2006)
- Journey Around the Sun (2011)
- Moods and Visions (2014)
- Tales of Two Guitars (2018)
- Syncretic Strings (2023)

==== Jorge Strunz ====
- Neotropical Nocturnes (2010)
- Guitar Whims (2025), a digital EP

=== As featured artists ===
- Sting - The Living Sea: Soundtrack from the IMAX Film (1995) (feat. Strunz & Farah); Soundtrack
- Rodrigo y Gabriela - 11:11 (2009); Track #6 (Master Maqui)
- Calima, by Gerardo Nuñez (1999); Track #9, "Sancti Petri"
- Speaking of Dreams, by Joan Baez (1989); Track #6; "El Salvador"

== Other compilation appearances ==
- Guitar Music For Small Rooms (1997) (WEA)
- Gypsy Passion: New Flamenco (1997) (Narada)
- Gypsy Soul: New Flamenco (1998) (Narada)
- Gypsy Fire (2000) (Narada)
- Guitar Greats: The Best of New Flamenco - Volume I (2000) (Baja/TSR Records)
- Camino Latino / Latin Journey - Liona Maria Boyd (2002) (Moston)
- The World Of The Spanish Guitar Vol. 1 (2011) (Higher Octave Music)

== See also ==
- New Flamenco
- Flamenco rumba
- Lara & Reyes
- Shahin & Sepehr
- Young & Rollins
- Willie & Lobo
- Johannes Linstead
