= Fury of Your Lonely Heart =

Studio album by Get Set Go
- Released: September 20, 2011
- Recorded: Summer 2011
- Genre: Indie rock, alternative rock
- Length: 53:19
- Label: Square Tire Music
- Producer: Michael Torres

Get Set Go chronology
Sunshine, Joy & Happiness: A Tragic Tale of Death, Despair and Other Silly Nonsense (2008)	Fury of Your Lonely Heart (2011)	Tumors (2013)

Professional ratings
Review scores
Source	Rating
Marquee Magazine	3.5/5 stars
PopMatters	7/10 stars

Fury of Your Lonely Heart is the fifth studio album by American indie rock group Get Set Go, first released to the public on September 20, 2011 via the group's self-run Square Tire Music label. Recorded over the summer of 2011 with recording costs paid for with fan donations via a KickStarter campaign, the album is the first by the group to feature bassist Jeremy Keeler, as well as the first released through the then-newly formed Square Tire Music. The album's cover artwork was done by the artist Dave Johnson, who also created the artwork for the group's 2003 debut album So You've Ruined Your Life.

== Track listing ==
No.	Title	Length
1.	"Love Poem"	2:15
2.	"Fury of Your Lonely Heart"	4:57
3.	"Looking East"	5:28
4.	"Lock Up Your Daughters"	1:52
5.	"Racecar"	3:15
6.	"Stone of Suffering"	3:49
7.	"I Cannot Breathe"	1:58
8.	"We Will Be Stars"	3:57
9.	"Hold On"	4:39
10.	"My Very Old Bones"	3:11
11.	"Flee the Sickness"	4:40
12.	"Little Bird Lost"	5:58
13.	"Stare At the Sun"	3:21
14.	"Disappearing Dark"	4:01
Total length:		53:19

== Personnel ==
- Michael "Mike TV" Torres – vocals, guitar, keyboards, percussion, production
- Eric Summer – viola, vocals
- Jeremy Keeler – bass
- Dave Palamaro – drums
- Dave Johnson – artwork
