= Guitarras Hermanas =

Studio album by Lara & Reyes
- Released: January 9, 1995
- Genre: New Flamenco, world music
- Length: 41:14
- Label: Higher Octave

Lara & Reyes chronology
Guitarras Hermanas (1995)	Two Guitars One Passion (1996)

Professional ratings
Review scores
Source	Rating
AllMusic	4/5 stars

Guitarras Hermanas is the first studio album released by flamenco-influenced Latin guitar instrumental duo Lara & Reyes. The most successful single from this album was "Cielo Sin Nubes" (Uncloudy Sky).

== Track listing ==
1. "Cielo Sin Nubes (Uncloudy Sky)" – 3:57
2. "Sabor a Mi (A Taste of Me)" – 3:36
3. "Viene Clareando (Becoming Clear)" – 2:46
4. "Barrios de San Antonio (Neighborhoods of San Antonio)" – 3:48
5. "Bajo las Sombras (Beneath the Shadows)" – 3:47
6. "Besos Rosas (Pink Kisses)" – 4:17
7. "Ojos de Mar (Eyes of the Sea)" – 4:10
8. "Cotton Candy" – 4:30
9. "Lejos de Aqui (Far Away)" – 5:26
10. "Waltz for John and Paco" – 4:25
