= Ordinary World (album) =

Studio album by Get Set Go
- Released: January 17, 2006
- Recorded: June 2005
- Studio: Stanley Recordings, Los Angeles
- Genre: Indie rock, alternative rock, pop-punk, indie folk
- Length: 78:45
- Label: TSR Records
- Producer: John Would; Michael Torres

Get Set Go chronology
So You've Ruined Your Life (2003)	Ordinary World (2006)	Selling Out & Going Home (2007)

Professional ratings
Review scores
Source	Rating
AllMusic	3.5/5 stars
PopMatters	7/10 stars

Ordinary World is the second studio album by American band Get Set Go, released on January 17, 2006 through TSR Records. The album marks a shift in sound for the band, going for more of an indie rock approach when compared to the slick pop-punk sound of its predecessor, So You've Ruined Your Life. All of the album's tracks were written during a time in which the band's main songwriter, Michael Torres, was addicted to drugs. Lyrical themes include misanthropy, drugs, alcohol, terrorism, the end of the world, murder, and relationship problems. It is the first album to feature long-time band members Eric Summer and Dave Palamero.

== Background and recording ==
Get Set Go formed in 2002 in Highland Park, Los Angeles with a line up consisting of guitarist, vocalist, and main songwriter Michael Torres (known by his nickname Mike TV), bassist Patrick Flores (known by his nickname Dr. Modo) and drummer Amy Wood. The trio were signed to the independent family-operated TSR Records in 2003 and released their debut album So You've Ruined Your Life in September that same year. The album met very little fanfare and next to no radio airplay, and by 2004, both Flores and Wood left the band to pursue other careers (both did, however, help with the production of Ordinary World later on). Torres fell into a state of depression afterwards and later became a drug addict.

During his addiction, Torres wrote 64 songs on his acoustic guitar, most of which later found their way on Ordinary World. By 2005, Torres was able to become sober and, with the help of new members of the band, began working on the second Get Set Go album. While Ordinary World was only ever released on compact disc formats, the design of the album is a homage to double disc LP records, with the track listing being divided into four "parts" (four sides of a record).

Ordinary World was recorded throughout June 2005, fourteen tracks at Stanley Recordings and another seven tracks at Nate Greeley's home studio. By this point in time, the "official" Get Set Go line up consisted of Torres, violist Eric Summer, and drummer Dave Palamaro. Producer John Would performed bass guitar on most of the album, although for some were performed by Patrick Flores. The same case was made for the drums, for some recordings were performed by Amy Wood. Nate Greeley also performed guitar on this album. Mixing duties were shared by Torres, Would, and Greeley.

== Track listing ==
All tracks are written by Mike TV.

No.	Title	Length
1.	"Crying Shame"	3:55
2.	"Get Thru the Day"	3:16
3.	"One Hundred Locks"	3:22
4.	"Ordinary World"	4:56
5.	"I Hate Everyone"	3:33
6.	"Lift Me Up"	3:49
7.	"Murder By Millions"	3:12
8.	"Do Over"	3:17
9.	"In the Name of All That's Evil On the Earth"	3:10
10.	"Mean"	3:10
11.	"A Little More"	3:35
12.	"Won't Let Her Go"	4:22
13.	"Sleep"	3:41
14.	"So Sorry"	2:51
15.	"My Wasted Life"	3:41
16.	"Suicide"	3:35
17.	"The Old Ennui"	3:19
18.	"Stay Away"	3:50
19.	"So You're Gonna Die"	3:26
20.	"Die, Motherfucker Die"	4:46
21.	"Music Makes Me Wanna Die"	6:00
Total length:		78:45

== Personnel ==
Adapted from the Ordinary World liner notes.

Musicians

- Michael "Mike TV" Torres – guitar, vocals
- Amy Wood – drums
- John Would – drums, bass
- Patrick "Dr. Modo" Flores – bass
- Ryan "Schmed" Mayen – keyboards, guitars, percussion
- Nate Greeley – guitars
- Eric Summer – viola
- Dave Palamaro – drums
- Kelsey Wood – backing vocals

Production and artwork

- Michael "Mike TV" Torres – production, mixing
- Nate Greeley – mixing, recording
- John Would – production, mixing, recording
- Dylan Hay J. Chapman – artwork, photography
- Vivian Barraza – photography
