= World Jazz (album) =

Studio album by Lara & Reyes
- Released: October 24, 2000
- Genre: New Flamenco, Latin jazz, world music
- Length: 49:08
- Label: Higher Octave Music

Lara & Reyes chronology
Navidad (2000)	World Jazz (2000)	Lara & Reyes (2006)

Professional ratings
Review scores
Source	Rating
AllMusic	4.5/5 stars

World Jazz is the sixth album released by the flamenco-influenced Latin guitar instrumental duo Lara & Reyes. This album was nominated for a Latin Grammy in 2001 in the category of Best Instrumental Pop Album.

== Track listing ==
1. "Leona" – 6:11
2. "Nuevo Mundo" – 5:23
3. "Sandia Fresca" – 6:55
4. "Danielle's Waltz" – 4:44
5. "Los Flamingos" – 5:25
6. "Que Boquita" – 6:04
7. "Amor de Lejos" – 5:19
8. "10 to 6" – 4:27
9. "Neila" – 7:44
10. "La Barranca" – 3:07
