= Elevation (Lawson Rollins album) =

Studio album by Lawson Rollins
- Released: 2011
- Genre: World music
- Length: 1:13:27
- Label: Infinita Records
- Producer: Dominic Camardella, Lawson Rollins, Shahin Shahida

Lawson Rollins chronology
Espirito (2010)	Elevation (2011)	Full Circle (2013)

Elevation is the third solo album by guitarist and composer Lawson Rollins. Rollins co-produced the album with Persian-American musician and producer Shahin Shahida (of Shahin & Sepehr) and multi-platinum producer Dominic Camardella (Flora Purim, 3rd Force, Ottmar Liebert). The cast of 20 different musicians includes the Grammy winning violinist Charlie Bisharat, avant-garde electric guitarist Buckethead, Nepali sarangi player Kirin Nepali, Iranian vocalist Parsa Hassandokht, Nepali flute player Rubin Kumar Shrestha, Iranian santourist Pejman Eckhtiari, and Nepali tabla player Raju Maharjan. Associate producer William Aura of 3rd Force recorded the Nepali musicians in Kathmandu, Nepal. The Iranian musicians were recorded in Iran by co-producer Shahin Shahida.

== Composition ==
Rollins composed all of the music on the album; however, the song "Parisian Rhapsody" was inspired by "Gymnopedie No. 1" by Eric Satie. "Francisco's Dance" contains excerpts from "Capricho Arabe" by Francisco Tarrega.

== Reception ==
Elevation received positive reviews from jazz, guitar, and world music critics.

The single from Elevation, "Daybreak", appeared on the Billboard top-30 Smooth Jazz Songs chart. The single peaked at #22.

== Track listing ==
All tracks are written by Lawson Rollins.

No.	Title	Length
1.	"Elevation"	5:22
2.	"Voyager's Tale"	5:43
3.	"Persian Night"	5:28
4.	"Parisian Rhapsody"	5:31
5.	"Santa Barbara Song"	4:27
6.	"Daybreak"	4:57
7.	"Shadows of Life"	5:49
8.	"Himalayan Blue"	5:55
9.	"The Wind at Dawn"	5:58
10.	"Francisco's Dance"	5:48
11.	"Slow Ascent" (featuring Buckethead)	5:11
12.	"The Diamond Path"	6:56
13.	"Ghosts of Alcazar" (featuring Buckethead)	6:14
