= Nicholas Gunn =

English musician (born 1968)

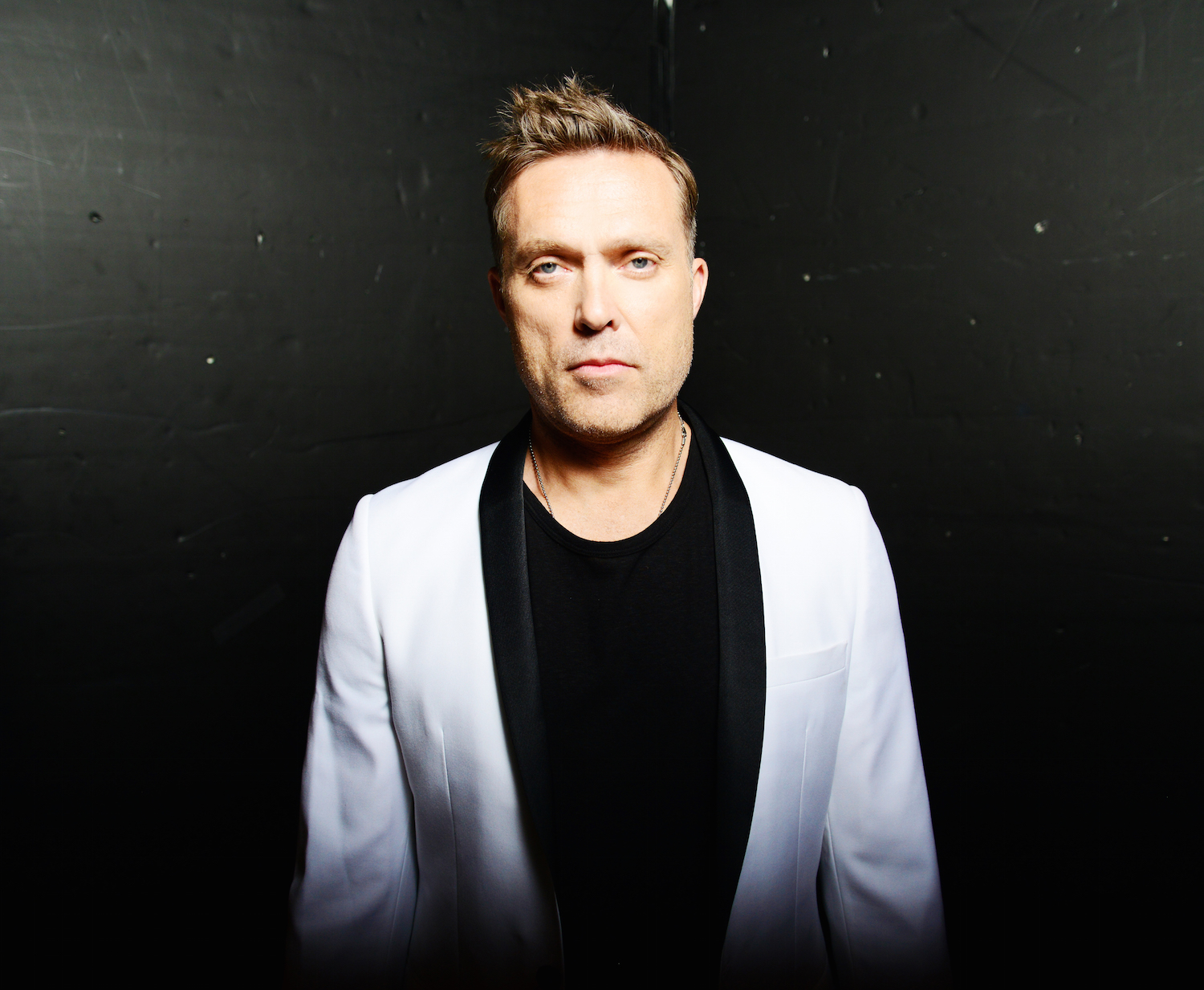
- Producer/Musician Nicholas Gunn

Background information
- Born: Nicholas Graham Gunn; May 30, 1968 (age 58)
- Origin: Rochester, Kent, England
- Genres: EDM, trance, world music
- Occupations: Record Producer, Musician, Composer, Arranger
- Instruments: Flute, percussion, drums, synthesizer, keyboard
- Years active: 1992–present
- Labels: Armada Music, Real Music, Gemini Sun Records, Spring Hill Music, Shotgunn Productions, Blue Dot Music

Nicholas Gunn is a classically trained songwriter, lyricist, and music producer. He is known for his instrumental works and his current works featuring vocalists from the electronic music space across Trance, Melodic House, and Chill. He is also the owner of Blue Dot Music, a record label and music publishing company located in the United Kingdom.

== Early life and education ==
Nicholas Graham Gunn was born in Rochester, Kent in South East England. At age six, he began studying flute at the Royal Academy of Music, where he remained for five years. Gunn's family relocated to Los Angeles when he was eleven. Gunn continued to study flute, and was bullied at school for playing the instrument. Eventually, he shifted to playing drums. After high school, Gunn briefly focused on modelling and acting, and appeared on an episode of Freddy's Nightmares.

== Instrumental music career ==
After unsuccessful attempts to obtain a recording deal from submissions, Gunn self-released his debut album Afternoon in Sedona in 1993. With national radio starting to escalate and CD sales starting to occur, Gunn received interest from nature retail chain Natural Wonders, which led him to a record deal with Sausalito, California-based instrumental music label Real Music. Re-released under Real Music in 1993, Afternoon in Sedona became an instant best seller at national retail chains such as The Nature Company and Natural Wonders. Gunn's second album, The Sacred Fire, was released in 1994, and peaked at number ten on Billboard's Top New Age Albums chart in February 1995. Gunn's third album, The Music of the Grand Canyon, was released later that year, and reached number ten on the Top New Age Albums chart. By 1997, the album had sold 200,000 units.

Outside of Real Music and the "National Park Series", Gunn has gone on to release numerous albums influenced by the beauty of America's landscape and parks, such as Return to Grand Canyon (1999), Through the Great Smoky Mountains (2002), Journey to Yellowstone (2003), and Beyond Grand Canyon (2006). Beyond Grand Canyon was also released as a DVD, in which Gunn paired his musical compositions with photography of the Grand Canyon taken by Michael Fatali, creating a unique audio-visual experience.

On Crossroads, his fourth album released in 1996, Gunn began to incorporate a Latin influence into his sound, a theme which has subsequently embraced a number of his other albums, most notably Breathe (2004) and Encanto (2007), on which he collaborated with award-winning Latin guitarist Johannes Linstead. It was also on his 14th album, Thirty-One Nights, that he heavily incorporated this Latin influence working with Flamenco guitarist, Chris Fossek. Inspired by his trip to Mexico's Yucatan Peninsula, the album also features Spanish spoken word. Released on 11 September 2012, Thirty-One Nights charted No. 8 on the Billboard chart in its debut week. It was also chosen by John Diliberto and Echoes as one of the Top 25 Albums for October 2012.

Gunn began combining his electronic sound with his instrumental roots in 2016 with the release of Under the Influence of Music.

In 2018, Gunn released Older (feat. Alina Renae) which was his first vocal-driven track under his Nicholas Gunn solo career. This was followed by the album, Riding the Thermals, which features four vocal tracks by the same vocalist. Riding the Thermals went on to peak at #6 on the USA iTunes Electronic Albums and #22 on Brazil's iTunes Best Selling Albums, amongst others. On April 24, 2020, Gunn released his 20th studio album recording, Pacific Blue, which again features four vocal tracks, also by Renae, and on February 12, 2021, he released Sound Condition, a compilation of 10 new songs, also featuring Renae's vocals. Pacific Blue received best Chill/Groove album in 2020 on the 17th annual ZMR Music Awards.

In 2022, Gunn released ambient instrumentals on his own label, Blue Dot, all the while releasing vocal driven chill house works on electronic music label giant, Armada Music.

In 2023, Gunn turned his focus towards his label, Blue Dot Music, releasing all nine of his 2023 recordings on Blue Dot.

In 2024 and 2025, Gunn relocated his label Blue Dot to the northern UK countryside which saw its largest expansion within the electronic music sphere. He released his album "30" in 2025, an album that covers the last thirty years of his musical career. "30" received August CD of the month from NPR show, Echoes, as well as receiving one of the best albums of 2025.

== Electronic music career ==
Gunn founded the musical act Limelght with then collaborator and partner, Tanner Wilfong. The duo released music under the moniker Limelght from 2017 through 2019 until the act was retired. In 2020 Gunn then began transitioning his ambient sound towards a more electronic House and Chill sound. Gunn released music on Armada Music. His track Higher with musical act York featuring Sam Martin as well as California featuring Chris Howard and Sensing You with AVIRA, all surpassed six million streams in 2022. In 2022 Gunn released multiple new singles collaborating with artists such as Dave Neven, Derek Luttrell, RAEYA, Diana Miro, Protoculture, Jarod Glawe and Richard Durand with his collaboration, Love You More with Dave Neven, receiving #43 on A State of Trance top 50.

His label, Blue Dot Music had over 85 releases in 2024. It received numerous Beatport top ten charting positions with three of Gunn's own trance collaborations appearing on Armin van Buurens A State of Trance 2024 Year End Mix. Gunn also received two top 50 A State of Trance positions. Voted on by the fans, his collaboration with Craig Connelly feat. Alina Renae, Miss You, received a #20 on the top 50 and his collaboration with Richard Durand feat. Jordan Grace received a #17 on the top 50.

In 2025 Gunn released For You with collaborators Richard Durand and Alina Renae. Appearing on his album "30", For You went on to receive a #12 position on the A State of Trance Top 50 as well as appearing on A State of Trance Year End Mix, mixed by Armin van Buuren.

== Producer, songwriter and lyricist career ==
Gunn has worked with Armin van Buuren, Aly & Fila, Luke Bond, Andrew Rayel, C-systems, Harshil Kamdar, Alina Renae, Mearzie and many more. In 2021 Gunn's song, For All Time (feat Kazi Jay) was voted Tune of the Year by fans on A State of Trance. Works appearing under his own artist name, written by Gunn, have also received #20 and #17 spots on A State of Trance top 50 tracks in 2024 and #12 in 2025.

== Discography ==
=== Albums ===
- Afternoon in Sedona (1993)
- The Sacred Fire (1994)
- The Music of the Grand Canyon (1995)
- Crossroads (1996)
- Passion in My Heart (1998)
- Return to Grand Canyon (1999)
- The Great Southwest (2001)
- Through the Great Smoky Mountains: A Musical Journey (2002)
- A Christmas Classic (2002)
- Journey to Yellowstone (2003)
- Breathe (2004)
- Beyond Grand Canyon (2006)
- Encanto (2007, with Johannes Linstead)
- Thirty-One Nights (2012)
- Twenty Years of Discovery (2013)
- Under the Influence of Music: The Complete Series (2016)
- Riding the Thermals (2019)
- Pacific Blue (2020)
- Sound Condition (2021)
- 30 (2025)

=== EPs ===
- 2023 – Thought of You featuring Chris Howard (EP)
- 2023 – Angel Eyes featuring Alina Renae (EP)
- 2023 – Heart of Gold featuring 88Birds (EP)
- 2024 – The Complete Set (Live) featuring Chris Fossek and Chris Howard (EP)
- 2024 – Desert Sky featuring Brittany Egbert (EP)

=== Singles ===
- 2015 – Beauty (Single)
- 2016 – Nature (Single)
- 2016 – Love (Single)
- 2016 – Reflection (Single)
- 2016 – Celtic Wedding Processional (Single)
- 2016 – Passion (Single)
- 2016 – Material (Single)
- 2017 – Ibiza Sunset (Single)
- 2017 – Saint Lucia (Single)
- 2017 – Don't Leave Me Now (single) Limelght
- 2018 – Older featuring Alina Renae) (single)
- 2018 – Canis Major (single) Limelght
- 2018 – Intoxicated featuring Alina Renae (single) Limelght
- 2018 – Right Now featuring Alina Renae (single) Limelght
- 2018 – We Are Light featuring Alina Renae (single) Limelght
- 2018 – Run and Hide featuring Alina Renae (single) Limelght
- 2018 – Don't Leave Me Now, Tom Fall Remix (single) Limelght
- 2018 – Little Warrior – Where Did You Go, Limelght Remix (single) Limelght
- 2019 – Nicholas Gunn – I'm Coming Home, Limelght Remix (single) Limelght
- 2019 – Those Summer Days featuring Jaik Willis (single) Limelght
- 2019 – Run and Hide, Remix (single) Limelght
- 2021 – Higher with York featuring Sam Martin (single)
- 2021 – Broken featuring Alina Renae, Giuseppe Ottaviani Remix (single)
- 2021 – Angels featuring Alina Renae, Scorz Remix (single)
- 2021 – California featuring Chris Howard (single)
- 2021 – Sensing You with AVIRA (single)
- 2021 – Beautiful Mind (single)
- 2022 – Love You More with Dave Neven (single)
- 2022 – Lose Control featuring Derek Luttrell (single)
- 2022 – Wild Child featuring RAEYA (single)
- 2022 – Entering (Twin Falls) (single)
- 2022 – Into the Bliss (single)
- 2022 – Hold Me Tight featuring Diana Miro (single)
- 2022 – Wings with Protoculture featuring Alina Renae (single)
- 2022 – Lighthouse with Jarod Glawe featuring Chris Howard (single)
- 2022 – Not Afraid with Richard Durand featuring RAEYA (single)
- 2022 – Follow You featuring Alina Renae (single)
- 2023 – Here I Am with Harshil Kamdar featuring Alina Renae (single)
- 2023 – My Life featuring Alina Renae (single)
- 2023 – My Life with Dave Neven featuring Alina Renae (single)
- 2023 – In the End featuring Alina Renae (single)
- 2023 – My Heart with Mearzie featuring Chris Howard (single)
- 2023 – You and I (single)
- 2024 – Miss You with Craig Connelly featuring Alina Renae (single)
- 2024 – About A Love with Richard Durand featuring Jordan Grace (single)
- 2024 – Here I Am with Harshil Kamdar featuring Alina Renae (Richard Durand Remix) (single)
- 2024 – Heart of Gold featuring 88Birds (York Remix) (single)
- 2024 – Living Like a Ghost with David Helpling featuring Heartracer (single)
- 2024 – Believe with Harshil Kamdar featuring Jordan Grace (single)
- 2024 – From Water to Wind (Live) featuring Chris Fossek (single)
- 2024 – Thought of You (Live) featuring Chris Howard (single)
- 2024 – Campfire (single)
- 2025 – You Move Me (single)
- 2025 – I Remember You featuring Chris Howard (single)
- 2025 – 30 (single)
- 2025 – Miss You featuring Alina Renae Acoustic (single)
- 2025 – For You with Richard Durand featuring Alina Renae (single)
- 2025 – Hurricane with Ciaran McAuley and Audrey Gallagher featuring Nicholas Gunn (single)
- 2025 – About A Love featuring Jordan Grace (single)
- 2025 – Blossom (single)
- 2025 – I Would Try with Ashley Wallbridge featuring Alina Renae (single)
- 2025 – About A Love with Richard Durand featuring Jordan Grace Acoustic Mix (single)
- 2025 – Líf Mitt with Fridrik Karlsson and Rakel Bje (single)
- 2025 – 30 York Remix (single)
- 2025 – Will You Think of Me (single)

== Songwriting Credits ==
Year	Artist	Song	Album
2021	Armin van Buuren, Aly & Fila	"For All Time" feat. Kazi Jay	Non-album single
2021	Luke Bond	"Our Anthem" feat. Kazi Jay	Non-album single
2022	C-Systems, Alina Renae	"Wanna Fly"	Non-album single
2022	Harshil Kamdar	"Coming Home"	Non-album single
2022	Mearzie	"Learning to Fly"	Non-album single
2022	Mearzie	"Hymn"	Non-album single
2023	C-Systems, Alina Renae	"Legends"	Non-album single
2023	Mearzie	"Wish You Were Here"	Non-album single
2025	Alina Renae	"On and On"	Non-album single
2025	Alina Renae	"Unravelling"	Non-album single
2025	Alina Renae	"My Home"	Non-album single
2025	Alina Renae	"The Rest"	Non-album single
2025	Mearzie	"Stargazer"	Non-album single
2025	Mearzie	"V entry"	Non-album single
2025	Mearzie	"May the Stars Guide You"	Non-album single
2025	Mearzie	"The Astronaut (Where Are The People Now)"	Non-album single
2025	Mearzie	"Journey to Sagittarius A*"	Non-album single
2025	Mearzie	"Grounded"	Non-album single
2025	Harshil Kamdar, Brittany Egbert	"Fallen Angels"	Non-album single

== See also ==
- Johannes Linstead
- List of ambient music artists
