= Navidad (Lara & Reyes album) =

Studio album by Lara & Reyes
- Released: August 29, 2000
- Genre: New Flamenco, Latin jazz, world music, Christmas music
- Length: 40:30
- Label: Higher Octave Music

Lara & Reyes chronology
Riverwalk (1998)	Navidad (2000)	World Jazz (2000)

Professional ratings
Review scores
Source	Rating
AllMusic	4.5/5 stars

Navidad is the fifth album released by the flamenco-influenced Latin guitar instrumental duo Lara & Reyes.

== Track listing ==
1. "Winter Wonderland" – 3:03
2. "Santa Claus is Coming to Town" – 2:15
3. "Have Yourself a Merry Little Christmas" – 2:40
4. "Away in a Manger" – 1:32
5. "White Christmas: – 2:19
6. "God Rest ye Merry Gentlemen" – 3:06
7. "Silent Night" – 2:21
8. "The Christmas Song" – 2:59
9. "Feliz Navidad" – 2:59
10. "Frosty the Snowman" – 2:09
11. "Silver Bells" – 2:18
12. "What Child Is This?" – 1:44
13. "O Come All Ye Faithful" – 2:05
14. "Angels We Have Heard on High" – 3:42
15. "Rudolph the Red-Nosed Reindeer" – 2:38
16. "Let it Snow! Let it Snow! Let it Snow!" – 1:55
17. "We Wish You a Merry Christmas" – 1:49
18. "Auld Lang Syne" – 1:59
