= Américas (album) =

Studio album by Strunz & Farah
- Released: 1992
- Genre: Latin jazz, flamenco
- Label: Mesa
- Producer: Jorge Strunz, Ardeshir Farah

Strunz & Farah chronology
Primal Magic (1990)	Américas (1992)	Heat of the Sun (1995)

Américas is an album by the musical duo Strunz & Farah, released in 1992. They supported the album with a North American tour. Strunz & Farah promoted the album as "'a celebration of five centuries of Spanish guitar in the Americas.'" Although often referred to as a flamenco duo, Jorge Strunz felt that the designation did not account for the Latin American influences.

The album was nominated for a Grammy Award for "Best World Music Album". It sold around 500,000 copies and peaked in the top five of Billboard's World Music Albums chart. Américas was a hit on adult contemporary music radio formats.

== Production ==
The album was produced by Jorge Strunz and Ardeshir Farah. Most of its songs were written by Strunz; he was influenced by Mario Escudero and Sabicas and the Latin music of his youth. The duo played Pedro Maldonado flamenco guitars.

== Critical reception ==
Professional ratings
Review scores
Source	Rating
AllMusic	4.5/5 stars
Boston Herald	B+
The Indianapolis Star	3.5/4 stars
MusicHound World: The Essential Album Guide	3.5/5 stars

The Indianapolis Star wrote that "the music is seamless ... Strunz and Farah's sounds turn magical when they're speedily playing the same notes (as in short snippets in 'Balada')." The Los Angeles Times determined that "the two guitarists have finally found the right balance between compositional interest, bubbling Latin-based rhythms and distinctive, ear-pleasing solos."

Guitar Player lamented that the album "suffers from a sanitized production, a sonic politeness at odds with Spanish guitar's visceral impact." The Boston Globe noted that "flamenco ... works as the unifying thread." The Houston Chronicle stated that the duo "again draw from the distantly-related traditions of Spanish flamenco, Afro-Cuban salsa (and similar Latin folk forms) and middle Eastern music."

AllMusic wrote that the album "melds the flair, dexterity and cultural roots of their combined Latin American and Middle Eastern heritages with the surrounding septet of tremendous musicians."

== Track listing ==
No.	Title	Length
1.	"Caracol"
2.	"Jaguar"
3.	"Candela"
4.	"Alas del Sur (Wings of the South)"
5.	"Américas"
6.	"Luna Suave (Soft Moon)"
7.	"Balada (For Heideh)"
8.	"Gypsy Earrings"
9.	"Rayo"
10.	"Selva"
