= Elevated (disambiguation) =

Elevated may refer to:

- Elevated (film), a short film by Canadian director Vincenzo Natali
- Elevated railway, a form of rapid transit railway with the tracks built above street level

== See also ==
- Elevation (disambiguation)
