= Armik =

- Born: Armik Dashchi
- Origin: Los Angeles, California, U.S.
- Genre: New Flamenco
- Instrument: Guitar
- Years active: 1991–present
- Labels: Baja/TSR Records, Bolero Records
- Website: Armik.com

Armik is an Iranian-Armenian American New Flamenco guitarist, producer and composer. His music blends Spanish guitar scales with flamenco improvisation, Latin jazz rhythms, and classical elements. Several of Armik's albums have reached Billboard's Top New Age Albums chart.

Born in Iran of Armenian descent, Armik showed an early talent for music. At the age of seven, he pawned his watch to buy a classical guitar, which he hid and practiced on in the basement. By nine, Armik had completed formal music lessons as well as a rigid instructional regimen. At the age of 12, he was a professional recording artist. In 1981, Armik moved to Los Angeles, where he performed with various artists before launching his solo career in 1994 with the album Rain Dancer. His second album, Gypsy Flame, helped establish him in the emerging New Flamenco genre.

In 2002, Armik founded his own record label, Bolero Records. His latest album, Mi Pasion (2026 Remaster/Remix), was released in January 2026.

== Discography ==
=== Studio albums ===
- 1994 - Rain Dancer
- 1995 - Gypsy Flame (AUS: Gold)
- 1996 - Rubia
- 1997 - Malaga
- 1999 - Isla del Sol
- 2001 - Rosas del Amor
- 2002 - Lost In Paradise
- 2003 - Amor de Guitarra
- 2004 - Romantic Dreams
- 2004 - Piano Nights
- 2004 - Treasures
- 2005 - Cafe Romantico
- 2005 - Mar de Sueños
- 2006 - Mi Pasión
- 2006 - Christmas Wishes
- 2007 - Guitarrista
- 2007 - A Day In Brazil
- 2008 - Barcelona
- 2009 - Serenata
- 2010 - Besos
- 2012 - Casa De Amor
- 2012 - Reflections
- 2013 - Alegra
- 2013 - Flames of Love
- 2014 - Romantic Spanish Guitar, Volume 1
- 2014 - Mystify
- 2015 - Romantic Spanish Guitar, Volume 2
- 2015 - La Vida
- 2016 - Romantic Spanish Guitar, Volume 3
- 2017 - Enamor
- 2018 - Pacifica
- 2019 - Alchemy
- 2020 - Esta Guitarra (Five Songs)
- 2021 - Spanish Lover (EP: Five Songs)
- 2022 - Illuminate (EP: Five Songs)
- 2023 - Guitar Seduction (EP: Five Songs)
- 2025 - Gitano Amor
- 2026 - Mi Pasion (2026 Remaster/Remix)

=== Compilations ===
- 2003 - The Best of Armik
- 2006 - Desires: The Romantic Collection
- 2008 - Fuego Gitana: The Nuevo Flamenco Collection
- 2014 - Greatest Hits
- 2016 - Solo Guitar Collection

=== Other Compilation Appearances ===
- 1997 - Gypsy Passion: New Flamenco (Narada)
- 1998 - Gypsy Soul: New Flamenco (Narada)
- 1999 - Obsession: New Flamenco Romance (Narada)
- 2000 - Guitar Greats: The Best of New Flamenco - Volume I (Baja/TSR Records)
- 2002 - Guitar Greats: The Best of New Flamenco - Volume II (Baja/TSR Records)
- 2005 - Bolero Gypsies: New Flamenco - Volume I (Bolero Records)
- 2005 - Music Fantasy: Volume I (Bolero Records)
- 2006 - Bolero Gypsies: New Flamenco - Volume II (Bolero Records)
- 2009 - Gypsy Spice: Best of New Flamenco (Baja/TSR Records)
- 2013 - Guitar Greats: The Best of New Flamenco - Volume III (Baja/TSR Records)
