= Highland Park Bowl =

Bowling alley in Los Angeles, California

Coordinates: 34°6′34″N 118°11′37″W

Highland Park Bowl is a Brunswick bowling alley located in the Highland Park neighborhood of Los Angeles, California. It opened in 1927 as Highland Park Bowl, but it was renamed to Mr. T's Bowl from 1966 until its temporary closing in 2014. It re-opened under its original name in 2016.

== History ==
Joseph "Mr. T" Teresa, an Italian immigrant by way of Louisiana, who owned a nearby liquor store, bought the property in 1966. It offered live big-band music and home-style buffets. Students from Occidental College and other Eastside campuses frequented the establishment.

By the late 1980s, the bowling alley had become a retiree bar. In the 1990s, a party-seeking younger generation brought up on punk rock, hip-hop started to attend. Teresa died in 2003 and his son ran the bar until 2014. He sold the business to 1933 Group, who restored and reopened the building in April 2016. The Spanish Colonial Revival facade was restored. The original bow truss ceiling was revealed, a 1930s forest mural was uncovered, and eight bowling lanes were refurbished, with new chandeliers made from old pinsetter parts. The business was renamed "Highland Park Bowl" and bands perform on a stage named for Mr. T.
