= Shahin & Sepehr =

- Born: Shahin Shahida, Sepehr Haddad; Iran
- Origin: Washington D.C., U.S.
- Genres: World, Instrumental, Nu jazz
- Occupations: Musician, Guitarist, Composer
- Instrument: Guitar
- Years active: 1994–present
- Labels: Higher Octave Music, EMI, Shahin Music, Sepehr Music

Shahin & Sepehr (Shahin Shahida and Sepehr Haddad) are an Iranian-American guitarist duo. Sepehr Haddad is also the author of the historical fiction novel, " A Hundred Sweet Promises" by Appleyard & Sons Publishing.

Their music is mainly composed of Spanish guitar melodies fused with components of soft rock, flamenco, jazz, new age, and influences of traditional music of Iran. Their influences also include artists such as Cat Stevens among others.

The group resides in Washington D.C. They have released eight CDs on the Higher Octave Music / EMI labels and are currently working on their next release. Their CDs have charted on the Billboard and R&R and Gavin Charts. They have collaborated with such noted artists as Dom Camardella (producer for Ottmar Liebert, Flora Purim, and Willie & Lobo).

== Discography ==
=== Studio albums ===
- One Thousand & One Nights (1994)
- e (1995)
- Aria (1996)
- World Cafe (1998)
- East/West Highway: The Best of Shahin & Sepehr (2000)
- Nostalgia (2002)

=== Singles ===
- "Fields of Change" (2008)
- "Casablanca - Dance Mix" (2009)

=== Other Compilation Appearances ===
- Higher Octave Collection 2: Music from Around the World, For Around The Clock (1995) (Higher Octave Music)
- Panorama: An Expansive Collection of Music from Around the World That Inspires the Heart, Mind and Soul (1996) (Higher Octave Music)
- Guitarisma: The Charisma, Passion & Romance of the Guitar (1997) (Higher Octave Music)
- Guitarisma 2: The Charisma, Mystique and Pure Expression of the Guitar (1998) (Higher Octave Music)
- One Light: Illuminations (1999) (Illuminations/EMI)
- Guitar Greats: The Best of New Flamenco - Volume I (2000) (Baja/TSR Records)
- Esoterotica: An Innerplay Of Love & Music: Celebrating Higher Octave's 15th Anniversary (2001) (Higher Octave Music)
- Channel Islands: The Essence Collection (2001) (Higher Octave Music)
- Highway 1: The Essence Collection (2001) (Higher Octave Music)
- Night Moves: The Essence Collection (2001) (Higher Octave Music)
- Barcelona: Music Celebrating the Flavors of the World (2004) (Williams Sonoma)
- Guitar Music For Small Rooms 3 (2004) (WEA)
- Gypsy Spice: Best Of New Flamenco (2009) (Baja/TSR Records)
- Guitar Greats: The Best of New Flamenco - Volume III (2013) (Baja/TSR Records)

== See also ==
- New Flamenco
- Flamenco rumba
- List of Iranian musicians
- Lara & Reyes
- Strunz & Farah
- Young & Rollins
- Willie & Lobo
- Johannes Linstead
