= Two Guitars One Passion =

Two Guitars, One Passion

Studio album by Lara & Reyes
- Released: February 12, 1996
- Genre: New Flamenco, Latin jazz, world music
- Length: 44:23
- Label: Higher Octave Music

Lara & Reyes chronology
Guitarras Hermanas (1995)	Two Guitars, One Passion (1996)	Exotico (1996)

Professional ratings
Review scores
Source	Rating
AllMusic	3/5 stars

Two Guitars One Passion is the second studio album released by the flamenco-influenced Latin guitar duo Lara & Reyes.

== Track listing ==
1. "Atardecer (Dusk)"
2. "Juego (Game)"
3. "Seguidilla from 'Carmen Suite'"
4. "Dia De Fiesta (Holiday)"
5. "Baghdad"
6. "Obsidiana"
7. "Spain"
8. "Camino A Paracho (Road To Paracho)"
9. "La Bikina"
10. "Luna Y Estrellas (Moon & Stars)"
