= Ardeshir Farah =

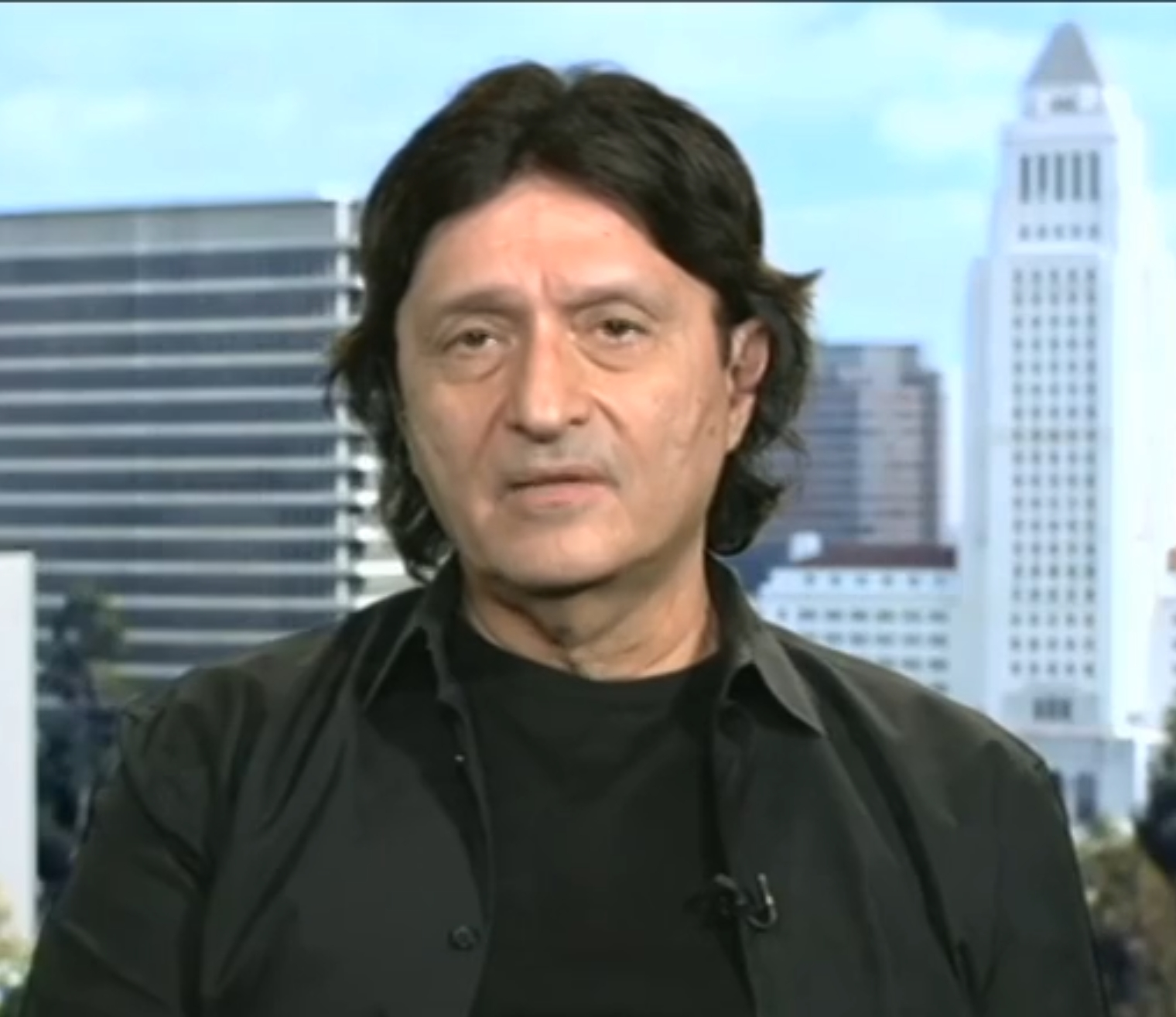

Background information
- Born: Tehran, Iran
- Origin: Tehran, Iran
- Genres: Jazz, Rock, Pop, Fusion, Flamenco, World, Latin, Instrumental
- Occupation: Guitarist
- Instrument: Guitar
- Years active: 1979 - present
- Labels: Valley Entertainment, BMG, Selva
- Website: www.strunzandfarah.com

Ardeshir Farah (Persian: اردشیر فرح) is an Iranian musician and guitarist.

== Early life ==
He was born in Tehran. Farah is half of the guitar duo Strunz & Farah.

== Career ==
Farah's work in Strunz & Farah earned him a Grammy nomination in 1992. His works include jazz, rock and pop music. Influence of Iranian music is evident in his works. He is a pioneer in combining Iranian music with Western music.

== Discography ==
=== Studio albums ===
- Mosaico, Jan 01, 1982 Selva
- Primal Magic, Nov 01, 1990 Selva
- Misterio, Jan 01, 1991 Valley Entertainment
- Americas, Jan 01, 1992 Selva
- Heat of the Sun, Jan 01, 1994 Selva
- Strunz & Farah: Live, Jan 01, 1997 Selva
- Wild Muse, Nov 01, 1998 Selva
- Flamenco: a Windham Hill Guitar Collection, Dec 30, 1998 BMG
- The Best of Strunz & Farah (Collection), Nov 01, 2000 Selva
- Stringweave, Jan 01, 2001 Selva
- Rio de Colores, Nov 01, 2003 Selva
- Zona Torrida, Jan 01, 2004 Selva
- Desert Guitars (Collection), Jan 01, 2005 Selva
- Desert Guitars (feat. Bijan Mortazavi, L. Subramaniam, Hayadeh & Manoochehr Sadeghi), Jan 01, 2005 Selva
- Jungle Guitars, Mar 21, 2006 Selva
- Fantaseo, Oct 17, 2006 Selva
- Journey Around the Sun, Mar 15, 2011 Selva

== See also ==
- Music of Iran
- List of Iranian musicians
