= Elevator paradox =

Statistical paradox

The elevator paradox is a paradox first noted by Marvin Stern and George Gamow, physicists who had offices on different floors of a multi-story building. Gamow, who had an office near the bottom of the building noticed that the first elevator to stop at his floor was most often going down, while Stern, who had an office near the top, noticed that the first elevator to stop at his floor was most often going up. This creates the false impression that elevator cars are more likely to be going in one direction than the other depending on which floor the observer is on.

== Modeling the elevator problem ==
Near the top floor, elevators to the top come down shortly after they go up.

Several attempts (beginning with Gamow and Stern) were made to analyze the reason for this phenomenon: the basic analysis is simple, while detailed analysis is more difficult than it would at first appear.

Simply, if one is on the top floor of a building, all elevators will come from below (none can come from above), and then depart going down, while if one is on the second from top floor, an elevator going to the top floor will pass first on the way up, and then shortly afterward on the way down – thus, while an equal number will pass going up as going down, downwards elevators will generally shortly follow upwards elevators (unless the elevator idles on the top floor), and thus the first elevator observed will usually be going up. The first elevator observed will be going down only if one begins observing in the short interval after an elevator has passed going up, while the rest of the time the first elevator observed will be going up.

In more detail, the explanation is as follows: a single elevator spends most of its time in the larger section of the building, and thus is more likely to approach from that direction when the prospective elevator user arrives. An observer who remains by the elevator doors for hours or days, observing every elevator arrival, rather than only observing the first elevator to arrive, would note an equal number of elevators traveling in each direction. This then becomes a sampling problem — the observer is sampling stochastically a non uniform interval.

To help visualize this, consider a thirty-story building, plus lobby, with only one slow elevator. The elevator is so slow because it stops at every floor on the way up, and then on every floor on the way down. It takes a minute to travel between floors and wait for passengers. Here is the arrival schedule; as depicted above, it forms a triangle wave:

| Floor | Time on way up | Time on way down |
|---|---|---|
| Lobby | 8:00, 9:00, ... | n/a |
| 1st floor | 8:01, 9:01, ... | 8:59, 9:59, ... |
| 2nd floor | 8:02, 9:02, ... | 8:58, 9:58, ... |
| ... | ... | ... |
| 29th floor | 8:29, 9:29, ... | 8:31, 9:31, ... |
| 30th floor | n/a | 8:30, 9:30, ... |

If you were on the first floor and walked up randomly to the elevator, chances are the next elevator would be heading down. The next elevator would be heading up only during the first two minutes at each hour, e.g., at 9:00 and 9:01. The number of elevator stops going upwards and downwards are the same, but the probability that the next elevator is going up is only 2 in 60.

A similar effect can be observed in railway stations where a station near the end of the line will likely have the next train headed for the end of the line.

== More than one elevator ==
If there is more than one elevator in a building, the bias decreases — since there is a greater chance that the intending passenger will arrive at the elevator lobby during the time that at least one elevator is below them; with an infinite number of elevators, the probabilities would be equal.

In the example above, if there are 30 floors and 58 elevators, so at every minute there are 2 elevators on each floor, one going up and one going down (save at the top and bottom), the bias is eliminated – every minute, one elevator arrives going up and another going down. This also occurs with 30 elevators spaced 2 minutes apart – on odd floors they alternate up/down arrivals, while on even floors they arrive simultaneously every two minutes.

== The real-world case ==
In a real building, there are complicated factors such as: the tendency of elevators to be frequently required on the ground or first floor, and to return there when idle; lopsided demand where everyone wants to go down at the end of the day; people on the lower floors being more willing to take the stairs; or the way full elevators ignore external floor-level calls. These factors tend to shift the frequency of observed arrivals, but do not eliminate the paradox entirely. In particular, a user very near the top floor will perceive the paradox even more strongly, as elevators are infrequently present or required above their floor.
