= Riverwalk (album) =

Studio album by Lara & Reyes
- Released: May 19, 1998
- Genre: New Flamenco, Latin jazz, world music
- Length: 44:33
- Label: Higher Octave Music

Lara & Reyes chronology
Exotico (1996)	Riverwalk (1998)	Navidad (2000)

Professional ratings
Review scores
Source	Rating
AllMusic	4/5 stars

Riverwalk is the fourth album released by the flamenco-influenced Latin guitar instrumental duo Lara & Reyes.

== Track listing ==
1. "Noches de San Miguel (San Miguel Nights)" – 5:10
2. "Black Mamba" – 5:15
3. "Solamente Una Vez/Amore (Amor, Amor, Amor)" – 4:28
4. "El Castillo (The Castle)" – 4:37
5. "River Road" – 4:08
6. "Milenio (Millennium)" – 4:06
7. "Satellite Island" – 3:43
8. "Romantique" – 4:14
9. "El Turco (The Turk)" – 4:42
10. "Pueblo Mágico (Magic Town)" – 5:52
11. "Olmos Park" – 3:28
