= Johannes Linstead =

Canadian musician

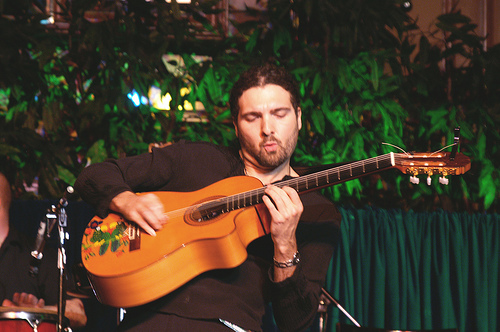
- Linstead performing live in Bahrain, April 12, 2007

Background information
- Also known as: Sevaji
- Born: Toronto, Ontario, Canada
- Origin: Sosúa, Dominican Republic
- Genres: New Flamenco, instrumental, Latin, world, new-age, jazz, Spanish guitar, tropical
- Occupation(s): Musician, guitarist, composer, spiritual teacher
- Instrument: Guitar
- Years active: 1999–present
- Labels: Real Music, Earthscape Media, Divine Earth Media
- Website: johanneslinstead.com

Johannes Linstead (also records under the name Sevaji) is a Canadian guitarist and instrumentalist who fuses virtuoso Spanish-style guitar with Afro-Cuban, Middle Eastern, and Latin American percussion and instrumentation. In 2017, Linstead was awarded the "Best World Album of the Year" in the T.I.M.A Awards (Toronto Independent Music Awards). He has/had an influential artist endorsement deal with the Yamaha Corporation of America and an endorsee with D'Addario String Co.. Further accolades include being named "Guitarist of the Year" in the prestigious Canadian Smooth Jazz Awards (2007), two NAR Lifestyle Music Awards, a nomination for a Juno Award and others.

== Early years ==
Johannes Linstead began studying guitar at age eight, when he was given a guitar for his birthday. As he progressed, he gravitated to the classical guitar; the only music he was exposed to as a child. In his teens, however, he also developed a love for other styles, such as rock, flamenco, and jazz. Popular composers and guitarists which have impacted Linstead as a musician include Sor, Tarrega, Giuliani, Randy Rhoads, Steve Vai, Yngwie Malmsteen, Jorge Strunz, Sabicas, Paco de Lucia, Al Di Meola, John McLaughlin and Angel Romero.

In high school he joined the school's jazz band and won the "Musician of the Year" award – the first of many awards and recognitions he has since earned.

Further influences in his music come from travel across the globe, including India, Bahrain, Spain, Cuba, Mexico, and at least two dozen others.

In his early twenties Linstead studied Hung Gar Kung Fu with Dr. Jopet Laraya but after 8 years of practice had to quit in order to prevent damage to his hands during brutal training. He went on to practice Qi Gong and studied with renowned grandmaster Weizhou Wu from China for many years until his death in 2006.

In an effort to deepen his spiritual practice Linstead began studying Kundalini yoga in 2001 and became a KRI certified instructor. Linstead was bestowed the name Seva Singh or "Lion of Devotional Service" by Kundalini yoga master Yogi Bhajan. The name Sevaji is derived from "Seva" meaning devotional service, and "ji", a term of respect. Since becoming a certified Kundalini Yoga instructor, he teaches whenever his tour schedule permits.

In the autumn 2006, Linstead contributed his song "Journey To Alcazaba" to the album project Artists for Charity – Guitarists 4 the Kids, produced by Slang Productions, to assist World Vision Canada in helping underprivileged kids in need.

In the winter of 2006, Johannes founded Divine Earth, an online humanitarian community where members post information about spirituality, health, and world politics. The philosophy of Divine Earth is that in order to attain a happier and healthy world we must first understand what substandard conditions exist that undermine the individual's ability to find inner peace.

== Selected recordings ==
- Azul (2017) winner of "Best World Album" in the Toronto Independent Music Awards; Top ten on the Billboard Smooth Jazz Most Added charts in the US; #1 on SmoothJazz.com most added;
- Midnight Rhumba (2014) winner of "Best World Album" and the "People's Choice" award in the OWMR Awards in the UK; No. 10 on the Billboard New Age charts in the US; nominated for "Best World Album" and "Best Instrumental Album – Acoustic" ZMR Music Awards.
- Tales of a Gypsy (2012) No. 1 on eMusic.com Flamenco/Tango charts; nominated for 3 ZMR Music Awards.
- Mistico (2009) No. 1 on eMusic.com World Music and Jazz/Blues charts; winner of "Best World Album" and "Best Instrumental Album – Acoustic" in the ZMR Awards,
- Encanto (Johannes Linstead and Nicholas Gunn) (2007) ranked No. 6 on Billboard's New Age Chart, 3 nominations in the NAR Lifestyle Music awards, nominated "Best Latin Album" in the IAP Awards.
- Cafe Tropical (2006) ranked No. 4 on Billboard's New Age chart, No. 1 on eMusic.com World Music chart, winner "Best Music" from Best Magazine, JUNO nominated for "Best Instrumental Album".
- Mediterranea (2004), ranked in the Top Ten on Billboard's New Age chart, reaching the No. 6 position and won "Best World Album" in the NAR Lifestyle Music Awards.
- Zabuca (2003), ranked Top Ten, and charted for 34 weeks. The song "Eleni" from this album was heard as part of Switzerland's Stéphane Lambiel's performance in the 2004 World Figure Skating Championships.
- Guitarra del Fuego (2001) was named "Best Contemporary World Album" by NAV Magazine, charting on Billboard for 36 weeks.
- Kiss the Earth (2000) 9 weeks on Billboard's New Age Chart, peak #12.
- Sol Luna Tierra (1999) 3 weeks on Billboard's New Age Chart, peak #17.

== JUNO Awards nominations ==
2007: Instrumental Album of the Year: Café Tropical, Nominated: Johannes Linstead

Total Nominations: 1

Juno Awards Artist Summary Johannes Linstead

== Discography ==
=== Studio albums ===
- 1999 - Sol Luna Tierra
- 2000 - Kiss the Earth
- 2001 - Guitarra del Fuego
- 2003 - Zabuca
- 2004 - Mediterranea
- 2006 - Café Tropical (Nominated for a Juno Award for "Instrumental Album of the Year")
- 2009 - Mistico
- 2012 - Tales of a Gypsy
- 2014 - Midnight Rhumba
- 2017 - Azul
- 2021 - Bohemian Strings

=== As featured artist ===
- 2006 - We Three Strings (Johannes Linstead, Bryan Lubeck, Tomas Michaud)
- 2007 - Encanto (Johannes Linstead and Nicholas Gunn)
- 2008 - Live! (David Arkenstone, Nicholas Gunn, Johannes Linstead and Loren Gold)
- 2010 - Dreams Go By (features Monica Fedrigo on Cello)
- 2011 - Everlasting Joy – Music for Yoga (Sevara feat. Johannes Linstead)

== Other compilation appearances ==
- 2002 - Camino Latino / Latin Journey – Liona Maria Boyd (Moston)
- 2002 - Guitar Greats: The Best of New Flamenco – Volume II (Baja/TSR Records)
- 2006 - Bolero Gypsies: New Flamenco – Volume II (Bolero Records)
- 2013 - Guitar Greats: The Best of New Flamenco – Volume III (Baja/TSR Records)

== See also ==
- New Flamenco
- Flamenco rumba
- David Arkenstone
- Nicholas Gunn
- Tropico
