= TSR Records =

American independent record label

- Founded: 1981
- Status: Active
- Distributor: Self-distributed
- Genre: Various
- Country of origin: U.S.
- Location: Tarzana, California

TSR Records is an independent record label based in Tarzana, California, that produced many hit songs in the 1980s, especially dance music. Founded by Tom Hayden (no relation to Jane Fonda's ex) and his wife Suzanne. The name TSR is made up of the initials of Tom, Suzanne, and their son, Ryan.

== Profile ==
Some famous songs released by TSR Records in the 1980s (while TSR was based in the former RSO building at 8335 Sunset Boulevard), include "Coming Out of Hiding" by Pamala Stanley, "Searchin' (Looking For Love)" by Hazell Dean, "So Many Men, So Little Time" by Miquel Brown and "High Energy" by Evelyn Thomas. Additionally, the release of techno dance music by the techno dance act Lime, in 1985, helped to establish TSR Records. Some of the techno dance songs produced include "Babe, We're Gonna Love Tonight" and "Angel Eyes".

Since its hey-day, TSR moved on from dance music to releasing mostly new age and smooth jazz music in the 1990s under the name Baja/TSR Records, including several Billboard chart-ranked albums of Nuevo Flamenco guitar music by Armik, Young & Rollins, Behzad, and Luis Villegas.

TSR has experienced most of its success in the 2000s with the indie band, Get Set Go. Releases include 2003's "So You've Ruined Your Life", 2006's "Ordinary World, and 2007's "Selling Out & Going Home". Get Set Go songs have been featured on ten episodes of the hit ABC TV show "Grey's Anatomy" and on both soundtrack albums from the show.

The label has also experienced success at the Smooth Jazz format with the artist, Nils. His track "Pacific Coast Highway" was named most performed song of the year at Smooth Jazz radio for 2005 by Radio & Records magazine. His album produced two #1 singles, the title track "Pacific Coast Highway" and "Summer Nights". Nils second album, "Ready to Play" was released in 2007.

In October 2005, TSR filed a lawsuit against Sony BMG Music Entertainment claiming the company's pay-for-play actions made it nearly impossible for independent labels to get airplay. The lawsuit centers its case on Sony BMG's payola settlement and the subsequent $10-million fine reached with New York Attorney General Eliot Spitzer in July 2005. The TSR lawsuit did not specify damages sought.

== See also ==
- List of record labels
