= Carole Anne Kaufman =

American whistler

Carole Anne Kaufman, also called The Whistling Diva, is an American whistler.

== Early life ==
Carole Anne Kaufman was born and raised in Monrovia, California to Bonnie Kaufman. Bonnie opened and ran a store, 'The Wizard Of Bras' which was opened in 1975. Her father was a spiritual healer.

Kaufman's father was a whistler him, and she practiced in his truck as a girl at age 5.

== Career ==
In her late twenties in 2004, she won second place in the 'Female Grand Champion' category in the International Whistlers Convention, held in Louisburg, North Carolina. She won 1st place in 2008 in Japan and in 2009 in the United States.

In 2010, she was in the PBS show California's Gold by Huell Howser. Also in 2010, Kaufman, along with five other women whistlers, took part in Susan Silton's piece "The Whistling Project". Silton, also a whistler, made the piece talking about gender role in our society, which included whistling back in the 1800s, which was seen as a boy's and men's activity still up until the early to mid 1900s. A common phrase back then which is sometimes still told to girls is "A whistling woman and a crowing hen will both come to no good end!”.

In 2012, she won Entertainer of the Year from the convention.

In 2014, the International Whistlers Convention dissolved due to financial struggles, in which Kaufman helped take over a part of the event. Kaufman is the artistic director and Founder for the Masters of Musical Whistling competition.

She is one of the producers for the Christopher Nelius 2025 documentary Whistle, where her and other whistlers including Yuki Takeda compete in a competition. Kaufman in the film also talks about the gender roles from back in the day.

== Personal life ==
Kaufman is also an comedienne, hairstylist and wedding minister. She is a feminist, along with her mother Bonnie. She completed her master's degree in 2017 at California State University Los Angeles.
