= World Whistlers Convention =

口笛世界大会 The World Whistlers Convention
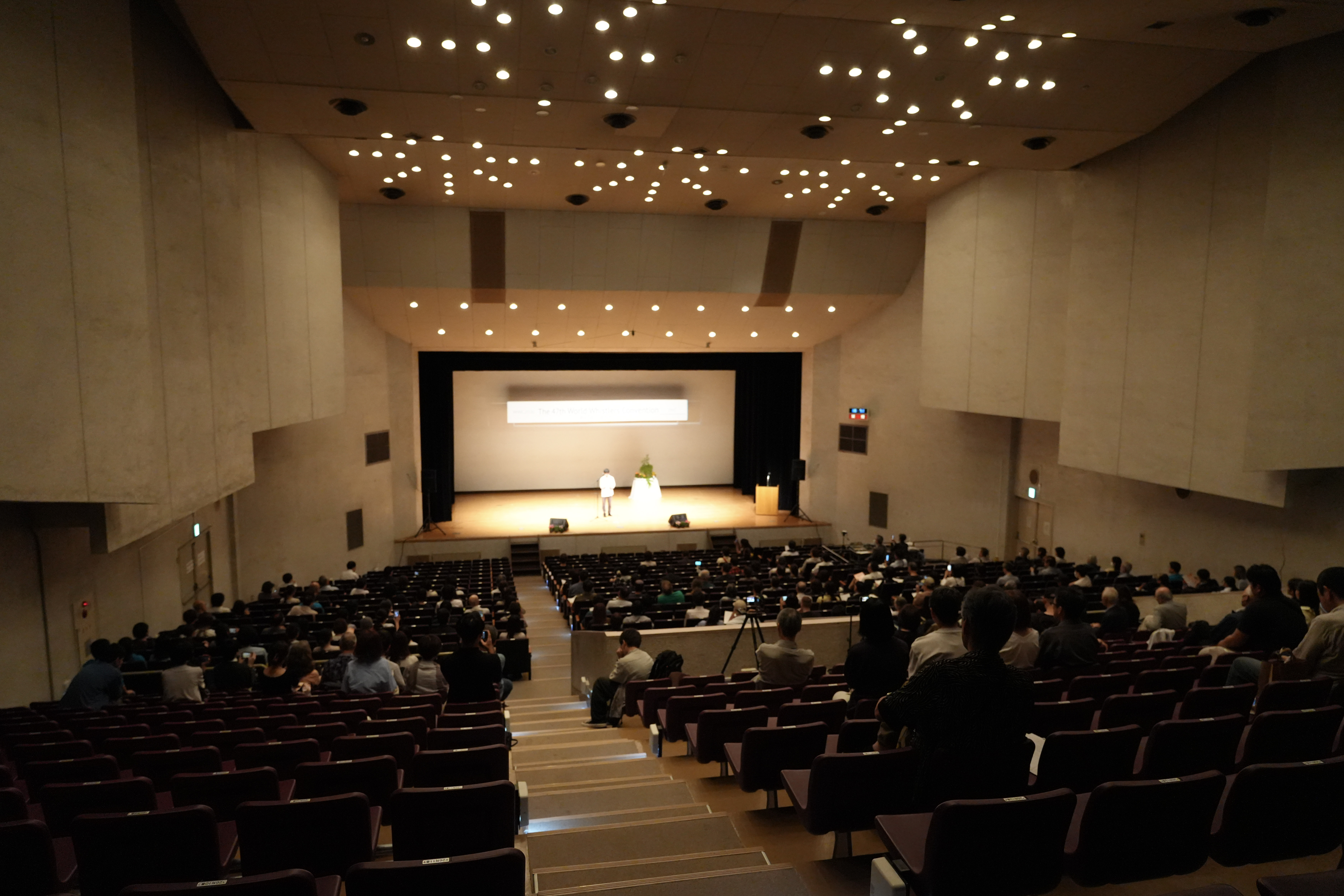
- The 47th World Whistling Championship (2026)
- Status: Active
- Genre: Music competition
- Frequency: biennial
- Venue: Kawasaki City Gender Equality Center, Scrum 21, and others
- Locations: Kawasaki City, Kanagawa Prefecture, Japan
- Country: Japan
- Inaugurated: July 15-17, 2016 (as WWC)
- Organiser: Japan Whistling Confederation (JWC)
- Website: whistling.jp

The World Whistlers Convention (WWC) is an international music competition in which whistling performances. It is an international competition and a continuation of the International Whistlers Convention (IWC), which was held mainly in Louisburg, North Carolina, and has been held biennially in Japan since 2016 by the Japan Whistling Confederation (JWC).

== History ==
The International Whistlers Convention (IWC), which was held mainly in the United States, was a precursor to the World Whistling Championships. Before becoming the IWC, the convention originated as a singing contest at a local festival held in Louisburg College. A man named Darrell Williams wanted to whistle instead of sing, and won in 1974 and 1975. it became a whistling contest from 1976 onwards due to founder Allen de Hart, a then psychology and english professor at Louisburg College who ironically didn't know how to whistle. The IWC is the world's oldest whistling event, and Japanese people have often placed highly after becoming international in the late 90s.

It was held in Ushiku, Ibaraki Prefecture in 2008 and in Kawasaki, Kanagawa Prefecture in 2014. At the 2007 IWC held in North Carolina, USA, Kimiko Wakiyama won in the adult women's division, Takumi Gima won in the teen division, and Chihaya Kosugiyama won in the child division.

The IWC ended with its 41st edition, held in Kawasaki in 2014. Following the IWC, the Masters of Musical Whistling International Festival and Competition (MMW) was established in the United States in 2015, and the World Whistling Championship (WWC) was established in Japan in 2016 by the JWC, headed by whistler Ryosuke Takeuchi. The WWC is held every other year, in even years, and the MMW every other year. Both competitions are held as events that include not only contests but also concerts, workshops, and symposiums.

The first WWC was held in July 2016 at the Kawasaki City Gender Equality Center Scrum 21 in Takatsu Ward, Kawasaki City.

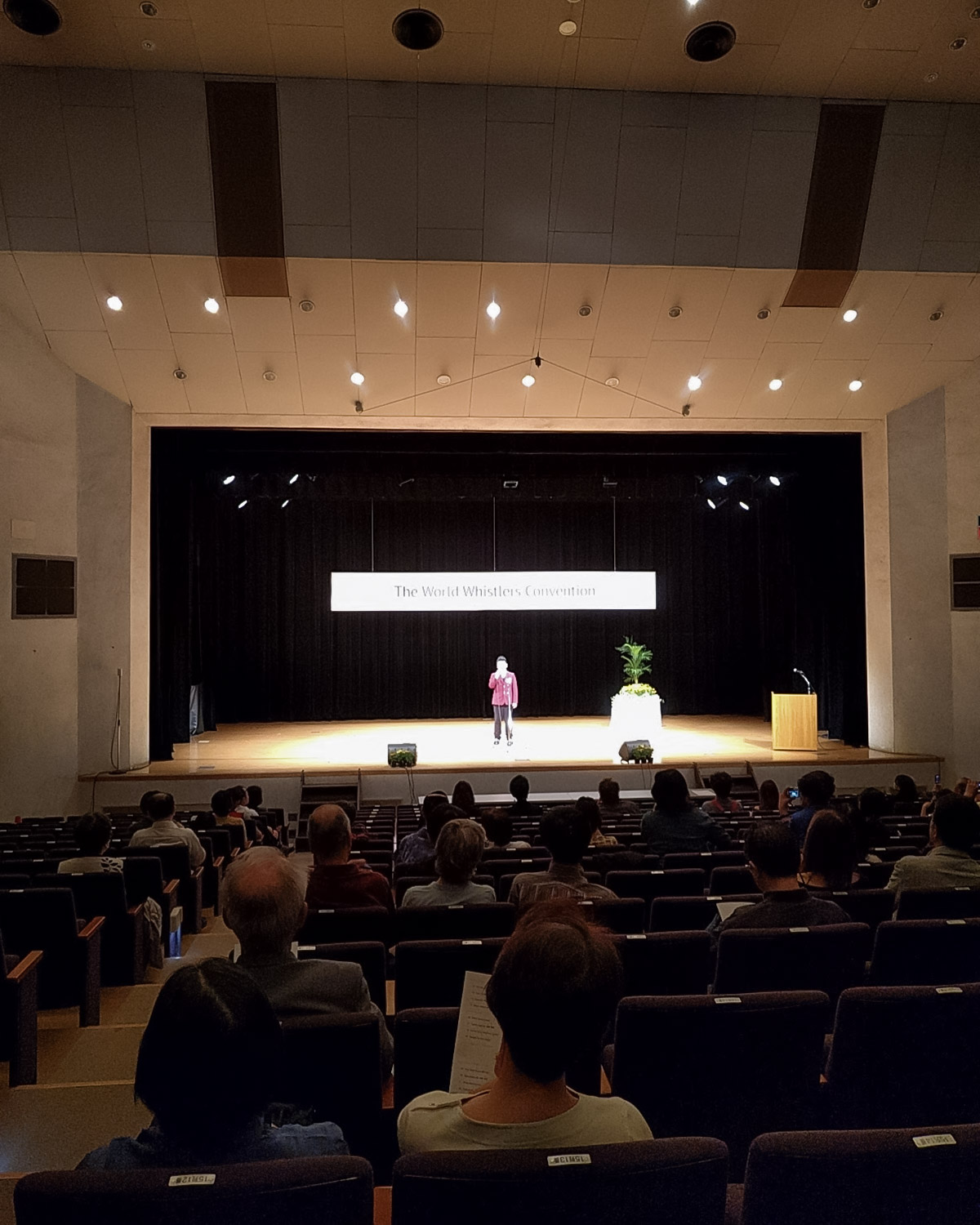
43rd Congress, 2018

In the predecessor IWC, separate men's and women's divisions were established in 1996 to encourage female participation due to the low number of female participants at the start of the competition. In the WWC, separate men's and women's divisions were discontinued from the 2018 competition onwards, and a female performer won the competition.

The 2020 tournament was canceled due to the COVID-19 pandemic. In the same year, whistler Yuki Takeda and others held an online whistling contest, the Global Whistling Championship (GWC), in response to the cancellation of the WWC. 131 whistling videos were submitted to the inaugural tournament, and winners were selected by a panel of judges plus public vote. Approximately 4,400 people from around the world participated in the public vote. The GWC was held again in 2022. The fourth tournament was held in 2026.

The World Championships (WWC) resumed in 2022 as the 45th edition, after a four-year hiatus, and was held at the Kawasaki International Exchange Center. The 2024 tournament featured 121 participants from six countries, ranging in age from 9 to 80 The 2026 tournament will feature 118 pairs and approximately 180 participants from six countries and regions.

== Competition section ==
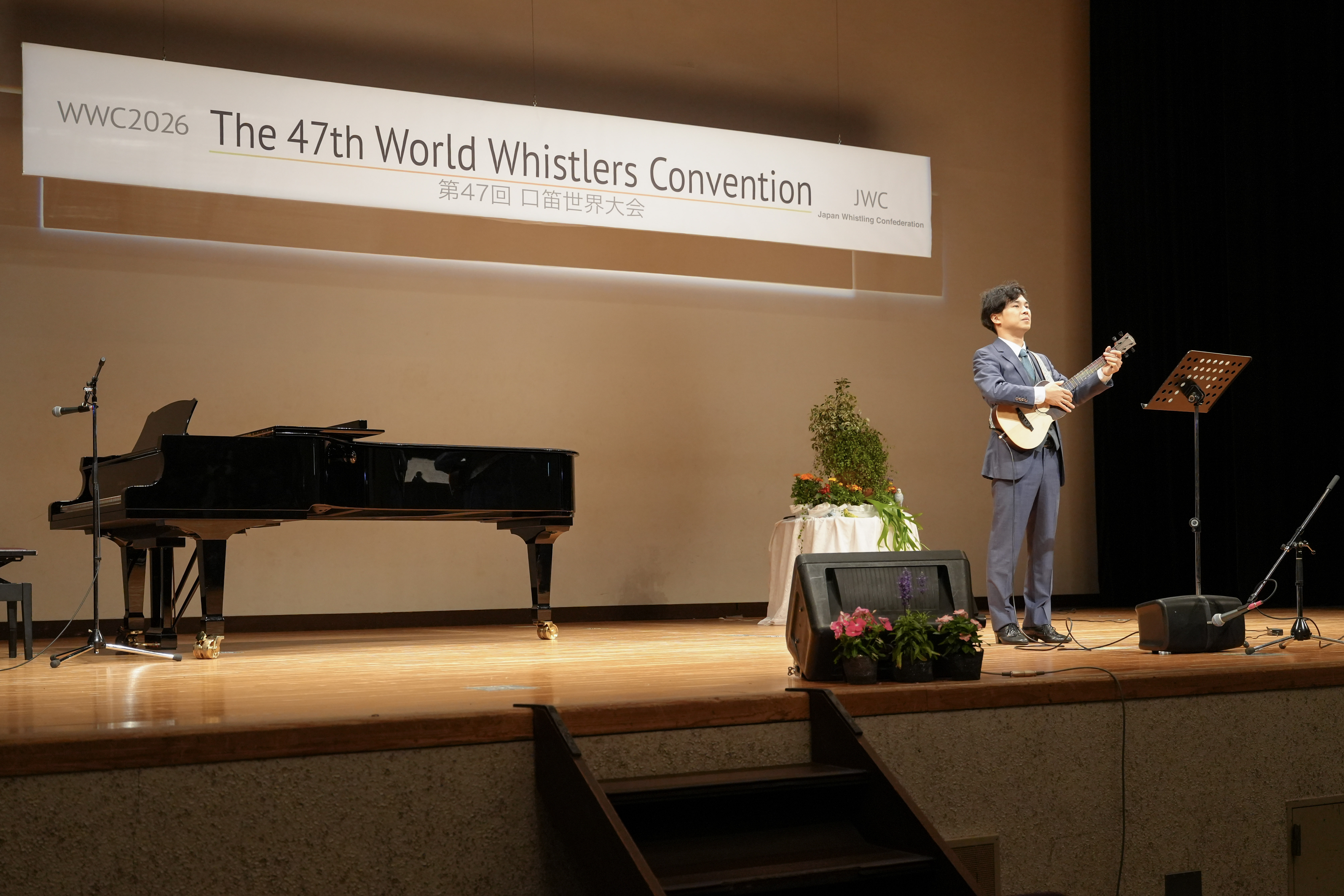
Yuki Takeda performing with his guitar (2026)

Contestants who pass the preliminary screening compete in the preliminary and final rounds on the day of the competition. From 2016 to 2024, there were three categories: "Soundtrack Accompaniment," where contestants whistle along to karaoke tracks; "Playing and Whistling," where contestants whistle while playing an instrument; and "Allied Arts," which incorporates elements such as dance and skits.

For the 2026 competition, the traditional backing track category was eliminated, and a new a cappella category was added, resulting in three categories: a cappella, whistling with an instrument, and allied arts.A cappella is a solo performance of whistling without accompaniment, while whistling with an instrument is a form in which one person plays both whistling and an instrument simultaneously. Allied arts is a category that combines whistling with accompaniment, group performances, and staging, and is divided into solo and ensemble categories. Only the a cappella category has age divisions, divided into child, teen, senior, and adult.

In the a cappella adult category and the saxophone-accompanied category, participants perform one classical and one popular song, and the scores from both songs are combined to determine the ranking.

In international whistling competitions, there are winners in each year and category, so there are multiple performers who are considered "world champions." Japan also has several performers who have won international competitions, including Kimiko Wakayama, Romu Aoyagi, Yūdai Takenaka, Akiko Shibata, and Yuki Takeda.

== Judging ==
The judges evaluate technical aspects such as pitch accuracy, tone quality, and breathing, as well as expressive aspects such as volume, vibrato, rhythm, and arrangement.

In whistling contests, Vittorio Monti's "Csárdás" is sometimes performed as a technically demanding staple. When the International Whistling Championships (IWC) was held in Japan in 2008, five contestants who performed the piece won first or second place in their respective categories.

== Events ==
Annual	Year	Date	Location	Notes
42nd	2016	July 15–17	Kawasaki	This was the first WWC event. Approximately 50 teams from 6 countries participated.
43rd	2018	May 3–5	Kawasaki	Approximately 60 people from 9 countries participated.
44th	2020	April 11–12	Kawasaki	Cancelled due to the impact of the COVID-19 pandemic.
45th	2022	October 7–9	Kawasaki	Held for the first time in four years. 103 participants from 9 countries. Satellite events were held concurrently.
46th	2024	May 30 – June 2	Kawasaki	121 participants from 6 countries.
47th	2026	June 18–21	Kawasaki	118 groups and approximately 180 individuals from 6 countries and regions participated. An a cappella category was newly established, replacing the tracked accompaniment category.

== Winners ==
The winners of each category and division as listed in the official results of each tournament.

Year	Category	1st place	Notes
2016	Audio Accompaniment Category: Adult Male Division	Atsushi Tadokoro	
2016	Audio Accompaniment Category: Adult Female Division	Swetha Surash	
2016	Playing/Singing Category	Nikhil K. Rane	
2016	Audio Accompaniment Category: Junior Division	Shin Ito	
2016	Audio Accompaniment Category: Senior Division	Jagat Tarkas	
2016	Allied Arts Category	Swetha Suresh	
2018	Audio Accompaniment Category - Adult Division	YOKO	
2018	Playing/Singing Category	Nikhil K. Rane	
2018	Audio Accompaniment Category: Junior Division	Shin Ito	
2018	Audio Accompaniment Category: Senior Division	Yoko Abe	
2018	Allied Arts Category	Swetha Suresh	
2022	Audio Accompaniment Category - Adult Division	Yuji Kogure	
2022	Playing/Singing Category	Takumi Gima	
2022	Audio Accompaniment Category: Child Division	Teppei Kawamoto	
2022	Audio Accompaniment Category: Teen Division	Shin	
2022	Audio Accompaniment Category: Senior Division	Yoko Abe	
2022	Allied Arts Category	Takumi Gima	
2024	Playing/Singing Category	Yuki Takeda	
2024	Audio Accompaniment Category - Adult Division	Matsumura Yuho	
2024	Audio Accompaniment Category: Child Division	AOI	
2024	Audio Accompaniment Category: Teen Division	Toshiaki Chiba	
2024	Audio Accompaniment Category: Senior Division	LIU YANG ZHAO	
2024	Allied Arts Category: Ensemble Division	Waseda University Whistling Club, also known as Rip	
2024	Allied Arts Category - Solo Division	Kana Aoi	
2026	Playing/Singing Category	Yuki Takeda	
2026	A cappella category, adult division	Yuki Takeda	
2026	A cappella category, Child division	Inaho Yoka	
2026	A cappella category, Teen division	Teppei Kawamoto	
2026	A cappella category, Senior division	Kensuke Sakauchi	
2026	Allied Arts Category: Ensemble Division	Larette Ami	
2026	Allied Arts Category - Solo Division	Masashi Ebihara	

== Related tournaments and events ==
In Japan, Masaaki Moku held the Osaka International Whistling Music Competition in Osaka from 2005 to 2018. The competition was held under various names, including the All Japan Whistling Music Competition. Moku was the first Japanese whistler to participate in the IWC in 2000, winning third place overall in the men's division, and this led to a trend of participants from Osaka competitions competing in the IWC.

In Japan, there are whistling events that do not involve judging, such as the "Waku Waku Whistling Concert" in Osaka and "Pakarama!" in Tokyo. "Pakarama!" was founded in the United States by Robert Stemmons and has been held in Japan since 2010 by Ryosuke Takeuchi, a whistler who is also the organizer of WWC.

== Media coverage ==
The 2024 competition was covered by NHK and other commercial television programs. On June 21, 2024, WWC organizer and judge, whistler Ryosuke Takeuchi, and Masashi Ebihara, third place in the adult category of the music accompaniment division of the competition, appeared on NHK Yokohama 's radio program "Hama☆Kira!".

The 47th World Whistling Championships were also featured on TBS Radio's " Shinichiro Azumi's Sunday Heaven " in the "Outing Research" segment on June 21, 2026. Several international whistlers, including Wakayama, Takeda, and Shibata, have appeared on the program.In addition, TBS Radio caster Rei Yanagisawa participated in the online whistling competition "GWC2020" as part of the program's project.

== Book ==
- Yuki Takeda and Hazuki Saiso, "The Story of Whistling," Mishima Publishing, February 25, 2025. ISBN 978-4-911226-15-5
