= Steven Herbst =

American whistler

Steven Herbst (c. 1946) is an American whistler and singer.

== Early life ==
Steven Herbst was born and raised in Hollis, Queens in New York City to a family of musicians. He also grew up in Flatbush, Brooklyn. His mother Majorie was a housewife while his father was a singer, painter, and whistler, which inspired Herbst as a boy to teach himself how to whistle, while his brother David learned 10 instruments. As a boy, he would whistle Prokofiev and Rimsky-Korsakov.

At age seven, Herbst was already performing his whistling in public, mostly to family friends and guests in secret. His family themselves didn't know the boy's whistling as he practiced alone in his room and was a loner.

== Career ==
Herbst was a student at the University of Pennsylvania, where he sang and whistled in the glee club. After university, Herbst performed at Avery Fisher Hall, Kennedy Center, and Carnegie Hall as both a singer and whistler. Herbst also whistled jingles for commercials including for Verizon.

Herbst was the narrator for Pucker Up: The Fine Art of Whistling.

In 2007, Herbst was put in the Hall of Fame for the International Whistlers Convention in Louisburg, North Carolina. As a performer, he won second place in both 1996 and 2001.

He still works for similar organizations, including the World Whistlers Convention.

== Personal life ==
He and his wife Melinda lives in East Village, Manhattan.
