= International Whistlers Convention =

American music competition (1980–2013)

The International Whistlers Convention was an international competition for whistlers that originated from a folk festival in Louisburg, North Carolina. It was started in 1980 as the National Whistlers Convention, the first whistling convention in the world. Although mostly held in Louisburg, the convention was occasionally held in Japan and China. In addition to competitions, the convention also inducted individuals into the Whistlers Hall of Fame in addition to competitions. The convention was featured in the documentary Pucker Up: The Fine Art of Whistling. The last International Whistlers Convention was held in Louisburg in 2013. In 2016, the Japanese Whistling Confederation started a successor event, the biennial World Whistlers Convention.

== History ==
=== Origins ===
The Franklin County and Louisburg College Folk Festival was founded in 1970 by Allen de Hart, a psychology professor at Louisburg College, to celebrate traditional music, dance, and crafts of the American southeast. The festival originally was held at Louisburg College in Louisburg, North Carolina. For the original composition competition at the 1974 festival, Darrell Williams from Durham, North Carolina whistled his original composition of “Little River Blues” instead of singing; he won the category that year and again in 1975, whistling.

In 1976, de Hart added a separate whistling competition to the festival; this was the start of the Whistling Contest. Later, the whistling competition was split from the fall folk festival and became an annual spring event. It was the first whistling convention in the world.

=== National Whistling Convention ===
By 1980. the event's new sponsor was the Franklin County Arts Council; the council was established by de Hart who served as its executive director. The name of the event was changed to the National Whistlers Convention (NWC) in 1980; a name that was trademarked. The NWC received funding from the North Carolina Arts Council. Judges for the competition consisted of professional musicians, professors of musical theory, and music composers; different judges were used each year to eliminate any advantage for prior winners.

Starting in 1981, distinguished guest whistlers were invited to the NWC where they performed and conducted workshops. The guest whistlers for 1982 were In Carlin Morton of Fort Myers Beach, Florida; Fred Newman of New York City; Jason Serinus of San Francisco, California who was noted as the "voice" of Woodstock in Peanuts! cartoons, and Maury York of Greenville, North Carolina.

In 1981 and 1982, the NWC was held in the Franklin County Courthouse in Louisburg. The event included the whistling contest, a concert with guest whistlers, and the Whistling Museum. In addition to the musical competition, awards were also given for bird calls, animal sources, and the loudest whistle. The grand champion for both years was Tobe Sherrill, a student from Greensboro, North Carolina. In 1983, the NWC expanded from two days to four days. This allowed it to include seminars, a banquet, and exhibitions. It became a tradition for the grand champion to perform on The Tonight Show Starring Johnny Carson.

In 1984, a new competition category for children twelve years old and under was added to the NWC. Amy Rose of Louisburg was the first children's champion. She was the children's champion again in 1985 and received national publicity, including performing on The Tonight Show Starring Johnny Carson. She went on to become the teen champion in later years.

In 1989 and 1990, 3,000 people participated in the preliminary round of the NWC. Each contestant was required to perform both a classical and popular piece. Contestants competed in the preliminary round by submitting a tape. Those performers were cut to 40 who would compete during the IWC. The NWC ruled that grand champions had to take a year off after two wins in a row. In 1990, it became a tradition for the grand champion to perform on Late Night with David Letterman. In 1996, the NWC began selecting both male and female grand champions.

=== International Whistlers Convention ===
In 1997, the National Grand Champion award was changed to the International Grand Champion, changing the event to the International Whistlers Convention (IWC). Its first grand champion was Desgagne. Changes in 1998 included expanded to two days and an evening of competition, requiring the competitors to prepare as many as eight songs instead of the usual two songs.

In 2000, more of the competitors were professional whistlers. The main competition divisions were adult, teen, child, and allied arts. Allied arts included people who whistled with their fingers or through ventriloquism. One reporter described the IWC: "The sounds that pour forth from the whistlers are astonishing; cascading warbles, bell tones, tremolos and trills, syncopated crescendos, octaves of excitement."

During the 2001 convention, David Heilbroner and Katie Davis filmed the documentary Pucker Up: The Fine Art of Whistling. By 2003, a newspaper reporter noted, "Louisburg has pulled off a neat trick of civic identity. It has created an annual event that is odd enough to attract wide attention, yet serious enough to be treated respectfully."

After the 2005 IWC, Franklin County Arts Council realized that it needed to plan for the increasing number of contestants and crowds, including expanded spaces and additional funding for the IWC. As a result, there was not an IWC in 2006.

When the IWC returned in 2007, it had record numbers of competitors and audience members. In 2008, the 35th IWC was held in Japan. The Japan Whistlers' Federation hosted the event with the assistance of the Franklin County Arts Council. The IWC returned to Louisburg in 2009, where it set a record for the number of participants and drew participants from Europe, Asia, Africa, Australia, North America, and South America. The 37th IWC was held in China in 2010 and was sponsored by the Qingdao Whistling Institute of China, against setting records for the number of participants and audience.

The Franklin County Arts Council board of directors voted to discontinue its sponsorship of the IWC in the spring of 2010. Louisburg was declared the permanent home of the IWC in 2012. That year, the IWC was sponsored by the Franklin County Historical Society. The society formed the Franklin County IWC (FCIWC), a special committee that was supposed to transition into an independent organization responsible for the IWC. Patricia Howell replaced de Hart as the director of the IWC. However, the FCIWC went defunct on July 24, 2012. The historical society again sponsored the IWC for 2013, the 40th anniversary of the whistling contest. This was the last IWC hosted in Louisburg. A 41st IWC was held on April 6, 2014 in Tokoyo, Japan, after which the historical society ceased to be the sponsor of the event.

=== World Whistlers Convention ===
The Japanese Whistling Confederation started the World Whistlers Convention (WWC) in 2016 as a successor to the International Whistlers Convention. WWC is held in Kawasaki, Kanagawa every two years. It has adopted the numbering system from the IWC, calling its 2024 event the "46th World Whistlers Convention". However, a quote from de Hart on the WWC website, clearly indicates that the WWC was a new event, not a transfer of the IWC operation.

== National Whistlers Museum ==
De Hart founded the National Whistlers Museum which opened in 1981. It maintained a collection of recordings, memorabilia, and some 300 whistles. The museum housed the Whilsters Hall of Fame Awards. It organized displays for the NWC.

== Hall of Fame ==
The Whistlers Hall of Fame Award was introduced at the 13th annual National Whistling Convention in 1986. Its first inductee was Agnes Woodward, founder of the California School of Artistic Whistling.

The Hall of Fame Award was given to a living or deceased whistler with "a history of achievement in the art of whistling with long-range efforts and success in promotion and production of performances, and materials to support the arts, such as recordings, appearances in concert halls, coverage by media, and awards as a performer that may be whistling or associated with whistling."

Following is a list of the members of the Whistlers Hall of Fame.

- 1986 – Agnes Woodward (California)
- 1987 – Bing Crosby (Washington)
- 1988 – Lillian Williams (Arkansas)
- 1989 – Don Robertson (California) and Fred Lowery (Texas)
- 1990 – Purv Pullen (Ohio)
- 1991 – Elmo Tanner (Michigan)
- 1992 – Robert Larson (Minnesota)
- 1993 – Alice J. Shaw (New York)
- 1994 – Roy Thoreson (Alberta, Canada)
- 1995 – Elmer Mullen (North Carolina) and Ronnie Ronalde (England)
- 1996– Mitch Hider (Oregon)
- 1997 – Joel Brandon (Chicago, Illinois)
- 1998 – Milton Briggs (California)
- 1999 – Betty Sylliaasen (California)
- 2000 - Marge Carlson (California)
- 2001 – Mary F. Herndon (Missouri)
- 2002 – Dick Shaw (Florida)
- 2003 – Jason Serinus (New York)
- 2004 – Petty Ediger (Oregon)
- 2005 – Barry Rector (British Columbia, Canada)
- 2006 – Madeleine Drummond (Pennsylvania)
- 2007 – Steven Herbst (Hollis, Queens)
- 2008 – Bobbejaan Schoepen (Belgium)
- 2009 – Ronald "Ron" McCroby (West Virginia)
- 2010 – Quingyao Cao (China)
- 2011 – Roger Whittaker (England)
- 2012 – Chris Ullman (New York)
- 2013 – Linda Hamilton (Toronto, Canada)

== Entertainer of the Year Award ==
The Lillian Williams Award was introduced at the annual National Whistling Convention in 1986 where it was presented to Purv Pullen. The award honored Lillian Williams a musician, humorist, and whistler, known as "America's Whistling Sweetheart". Later, it was called the Entertainer of the Year Award, presented in honor of Lillian Williams.

Following is a list of winners of the Entertainer of the Year Award.

- 1986 – Purv Pullen (Nut Tree, California)
- 1987 – Milton Briggs (Carmichael, California)
- 1988 – Roy Thoreson (Calgary, Alberta, Canada)
- 1989 – Robert Larson (Minneapolis, Minnesota)
- 1990 – Marge Carlson (Fullerton California)
- 1991 – Robert "Bob" Larson (Minneapolis, Minnesota)
- 1992 – Barry Rector (British Columbia, Canada)
- 1993 – Jason Serinus (California)
- 1994 – Mitch Hider (Oregon)
- 1995 – Betty Sylliaasen (California)
- 1996 – Fred Newman (New York)
- 1997– Greg N. Smith (North Carolina)
- 1998 – Mary Frances Herndon (Missouri)
- 1999 – Christopher Ullman (Virginia)
- 2000 – Patty Ediger (Oregon)
- 2001 – Michael Cooney (Alberta, Canada)
- 2002 – Stanley Dalrymple (North Carolina)
- 2003 – Steven Herbst (New York City, New York)
- 2004 – Steven Herbst (New York City, New York) and Carole Skinner (South Dakota)
- 2005 – Phyllis Heil (North Carolina) and Steven Herbst (New York City, New York)
- 2006 – Geert Chatrou (Netherlands) and Phyllis Heil (North Carolina)
- 2007 – Tom Bryant (Florida) and Phyllis Heil (North Carolina)
- 2008 – Kimiko Wakiyama (Japan) and Geert Chatrou (Netherlands)
- 2009 – Phyllis Heil (North Carolina) and Sean Lomax (Pennsylvania)
- 2010 – Geert Chatrou (Netherlands) and Phyllis Heil (North Carolina)
- 2011 – Tormod Rogne (Norway) and Linda Hamilton (Canada)
- 2012 – Carole Anne Kaufman (California) and Michael Bravin (Maryland)
- 2013 – Joe Sodano (New Jersey) and Phyllis Heil (North Carolina)
- 2014 - Akiko Shibata (Fukushima, Japan)

== Awards ==
=== National Whistlers Convention ===
Year	Award	1st place	2nd place	References
1981	Grand Champion	Tobe Sherrill (Greensboro, North Carolina)		
1982	Grand Champion	Tobe Sherrill (Greensboro, North Carolina)		
1982	Senior Champion	Elmer Mullen (Louisburg, North Carolina)		
1982	Classical Champion	Ralph Stecker (Raleigh, North Carolina)		
1983	Grand Champion	Ralph Stecker (Raleigh, North Carolina)	Irving Cohen (Oakland, California)	
1983	Classical Champion	Mimi Burke (Falls Church, Virginia)	Irving Cohen (Oakland, California)	
1983	Contemporary Champion	Isiah McArn (Wilson, North Carolina)		
1984	Grand Champion	Irving Cohen (Oakland, California)	Peter Hassell (New Rochelle, New York)	
1984	Children's Champion	Amy Rose (Louisburg, North Carolina)		
1985	Grand Champion	Peter Hassell (New Rochelle, New York)	Joel A. Brandon (Richmond, California)	
1985	Children's Champion	Amy Rose (Louisburg, North Carolina)		
1986	Grand Champion	Joel A. Brandon (Richmond, California)	Daniel Bell (Roseville, California)	
1986	Children's Champion	Amy Rose (Louisburg, North Carolina)		
1987	Grand Champion	Joel A. Brandon (Richmond, California)	Ugo Conti (El Cerrito, California)	
1987	Children's Champion	Jennifer Simmons (Youngsville, North Carolina)		
1988	Grand Champion	Daniel Bell (Sunnyvale, California)	Gregory Nye Smith (Raleigh, North Carolina)	
1988	Teenage Champion	Mike DeVente (Raleigh, North Carolina) and Patrick Riley (Efland, North Carolina)	Amy Rose (Louisburg, North Carolina)	
1988	Children's Champion	Jennifer Simmons (Youngsville, North Carolina)	Jeffrey Tillitt (Louisburg, North Carolina)	
1989	Grand Champion	Sean Lomax (Aiea, Hawaii)	Ugo Conti (El Cerrito, California)	
1989	Teenage Champion	Amy Rose (Louisburg, North Carolina)	Tracey Solomon (Louisburg, North Carolina)	
1989	Children's Champion	Terri Long (Louisburg, North Carolina)	Tawonda Glover (Franklinton, North Carolina)	
1990	Grand Champion	Gregory Nye Smith (Raleigh, North Carolina)	Sean Lomax (Los Angeles California)	
1990	Teenage Champion	Amy Rose (Louisburg, North Carolina)	Tawonda Glover (Franklinton, North Carolina)	
1990	Children's Champion	Jeffrey Tillitt (Centerville, North Carolina)		
1991	Grand Champion	Gregory Nye Smith (Raleigh, North Carolina)	Mimi Drummond (Horsham, Pennsylvania)	
1991	Teenage Champion	Suzanne Stafford (Louisburg, North Carolina)	Mark Hodge (Louisburg, North Carolina)	
1991	Children's Champion	Jeffrey Tillitt (Franklin County, North Carolina)	Carrie Murry (Castalia, North Carolina)	
1992	Grand Champion	Sean Lomax (Murrieta, California)	Tanguay Desgagné (Sherbrooke, Quebec, Canada)	
1992	Teenage Grand Champion	Suzanne Stafford (Louisburg, North Carolina)	Anthony Alson (Louisburg, North Carolina)	
1992	Children's Champion	Jeffrey Tillitt (Las Vegas, Nevada)	Kirsten Davis (Louisburg, North Carolina)	
1993	Grand Champion	Tanguay Desgagne (Sherbrooke, Quebec, Canada)	Jason Serinus (Oakland, California)	
1993	Allied Arts Champion	Dick Shaw (Apopka, Florida)		
1993	Teenage Grand Champion	Amy Rose (Louisburg, North Carolina)	Jeffrey Tillitt (Louisburg, North Carolina)	
1993	Children's Champion	Elizabeth Burchette (Louisburg, North Carolina)	Kirsten Davis (Franklin County, North Carolina)	
1994	Grand Champion	Chris Ullman (Washington. D.C.)	Tanguay Desgagne (Sherbrooke, Quebec, Canada)	
1994	Champion Pop	Chris Ullman (Washington. D.C.)		
1994	Champion Classical	Chris Ullman (Washington. D.C.)		
1994	Teenage Grand Champion	Suzanne Stafford (Louisburg, North Carolina)	Tony Woodard (Epsom, North Carolina)	
1994	Children's Champion	Tim Pender and Charlie Glover (Franklinton, North Carolina)	Steven Floyd (Bunn, North Carolina)	
1995	Grand Champion	Tanguay Desgagne (Sherbrooke, Quebec, Canada)	Chris Ullman (Washington. D.C.)	
1995	Champion Classical	Tanguay Desgagne (Sherbrooke, Quebec, Canada)		
1995	Champion Pop	Tanguay Desgagne (Sherbrooke, Quebec, Canada)		
1995	Teenage Grand Champion	Suzanne Stafford (Louisburg, North Carolina)		
1995	Children's Champion	Kirsten Davis (Franklin County, North Carolina)		
1996	Grand Champion Male	Chris Ullman (Washington, D.C.)	Steve Herbst (New York City, New York)	
1996	Grand Champion Female	Mary Frances Herndon (Sedalia, Missouri)	Laura Loftsgaarden (Los Angeles, California)	
1996	Allied Arts Champion	Elaine Clark (Sterling, Colorado) and Claudia Hutcheon (Spring Lake, North Carolina)		
1996	Duet Champion	Elaine Clark (Sterling, Colorado) and Claudia Hutcheon (Spring Lake, North Carolina)		
1996	Canadian Championship Award	Tanguay Desgagne (Sherbrooke, Quebec, Canada)	Michael Cooney (Edmonton, Alberta, Canada)	
1996	Teenage Grand Champion	Marco Gualtieri (Dollard Des Ormeaux, Quebec, Canada)	Steven Floyd (Louisburg, North Carolina)	
1996	Teenage Allied Champion	Tony Woodward (Louisburg, North Carolina)		
1996	Children's Champion	Kirsten Davis (Franklinton, North Carolina)		

=== International Whistlers Convention ===
Year	Award	1st place	2nd place	References
1997	Grand Champion	Tanguay Desgagne (Sherbrooke, Quebec, Canada)		
1997	Male Grand Champion	Tanguay Desgagne (Sherbrooke, Quebec, Canada)	Michael Cooney (Edmonton, Alberta, Canada)	
1997	Female Grand Champion	Mary Frances Herndon (Sedalia, Missouri)	Madeleine Deslisle (Dollard-des-Ormeaux, Quebec, Canada)	
1997	Teenage Grand Champion	Tony Woodard (Louisburg, North Carolina)	Spencer Wright (Southampton, New York)	
1997	Children's Grand Champion	Michael Barimo (Winter Haven, Florida)	Angelica Barker (Franklinton, North Carolina)	
1998	Male Grand Champion	Tanguay Desgagne (Sherbrooke, Quebec, Canada)	Chris Ullman (Arlington, Virginia)	
1998	Female Grand Champion	Mimi Drummond (Horsham, Pennsylvania)	Astrid Hillebrand (Nottuln, Germany)	
1998	Teenage Grand Champion	Michael Barimo (Winter Park. Florida)	James Smith (Louisburg, North Carolina)	
1998	Children's Grand Champion	Blair Haggett (Alexandria, Virginia)	Joseph Pellegrino (Franklinton, North Carolina)	
1999	Male Grand Champion	Christopher Ullman (Arlington, Virginia)	Kilgour Shives (Vancouver, Canada)	
1999	Female Grand Champion	Mimi Drummond (Horsham, Pennsylvania)	Betty Sylliaasen (Sacramento, California)	
1999	Teenage Grand Champion	Jeff Tillitt (Louisburg, North Carolina)		
1999	Children's Grand Champion	Blair Haggett (Alexandria, Virginia)	Joseph Cutchins III (Franklinton, North Carolina)	
2000	Male Grand Champion	Christopher Ullman (Arlington, Virginia)	Michael Cooney (Edmonton, Alberta, Canada)	
2000	Female Grand Champion	Emily Eagen (Cincinnati, Ohio)	Laura Loftsgaarden (Los Angeles, California)	
2000	Allied Arts Champion	Emily Eagen (Cincinnati, Ohio)		
2000	Teenage Grand Champion	Jeff Tillitt (Louisburg, North Carolina)		
2000	Children's Grand Champion	Blair Haggett (Alexandria, Virginia)	Joseph Cutchins III (Franklinton, North Carolina)	
2001	Male Grand Champion	Michael Cooney (Edmonton, Alberta, Canada)	Steven Herbst (New York City, New York)	
2001	Female Grand Champion	Emily Eagen (Cincinnati, Ohio)	Mary Frances Herndon (Sedalia, Missouri)	
2001	Grand Champion Classical	Steven Herbst (New York City, New York)		
2001	Teenage Grand Champion Male	Joshua Moore (Louisburg, North Carolina)		
2001	Teenage Grand Champion Female	Castalia Leonard and Christian Leonard (Louisburg, North Carolina)		
2001	Children's Grand Champion	Tre Cutchins (Franklinton, North Carolina)	Casey Aycock (Louisburg, North Carolina)	
2002	Male Grand Champion	Steven Herbst (New York City, New York)	Dan Gilliland (Dadeville, Alabama)	
2002	Female Grand Champion	Carole Skinner (Miller, South Dakota)	Betty Sylliaasen (Sacramento, California)	
2002	Teenage Grand Champion	Spencer Wright (Santa Cruz, California)		
2002	Children's Grand Champion	Blair Haggett (Alexandria, Virginia)	Tre Cutchens (Franklinton, North Carolina)	
2003	Male Grand Champion	David Morris (Dobcross, Oldham, England)	Steven Herbst (New York City, New York)	
2003	Female Grand Champion	Carole Skinner (Miller, South Dakota)	Carole Kaufman (Pasadena, California)	
2003	Teenage Grand Champion Male	Cal Fenwic (Kirkfield, Ontario, Canada)		
2003	Teenage Grand Champion Female	Christian Leonard (Louisburg, North Carolina)		
2003	Children's Grand Champion	Casey Aycock (Louisburg, North Carolina)	Ashleigh Kibbe (Youngsville, North Carolina)	
2004	Male Grand Champion	Geert Chatrou (Mierlo, Netherlands)	Steven Herbst (New York City, New York)	
2004	Female Grand Champion	Sandra Henzler (Fort Collins, Colorado)	Carole Anne Kaufman (Pasadena, California)	
2004	Teenage Grand Champion Male	Cal Fenwick (Kirkfield, Ontario, Canada)	Todd Dickerson (Hickory, North Carolina)	
2004	Teenage Grand Champion Female	Malia French (West Jordan, Utah)	Casey Aycock (Louisburg, North Carolina)	
2004	Children's Grand Champion	Emily Edwards (Louisburg, North Carolina)	Queena Stewart (Ithaca, New York)	
2005	Male Grand Champion	Geert Chatrou (Mierlo, Netherlands)		
2005	Female Grand Champion	Sandra Henzler (Fort Collins, Colorado)		
2005	Teenage Grand Champion	Todd Dickerson (Hickory, North Carolina)		
2005	Children's Grand Champion	Emily Edwards (Louisburg, North Carolina)		
2007	Male Grand Champion	Terry Rappold (Harahan, Louisiana)	Shinichi Urushihara (Ushiku, Ibaraki, Japan)	
2007	Female Grand Champion	Kimiko Wakiyama (Higashiyamato, Tokyo, Japan)	Patricia Sonnier (Mount Juliet, Tennessee)	
2007	Teenage Male Champion	Takumi Gima (Osaka Sayama, Osaka, Japan)	Todd Dickerson (Hickory, North Carolina)	
2007	Teenage Female Champion	Emily Edwards (Zebulon, North Carolina)	Alysha Wonka (Louisburg, North Carolina)	
2007	Grand Children's Champion	Chihaya Kosugiyama (Toyonaka, Japan)	Paula Edwards (Zebulon, North Carolina)	
2007	Allied Arts Champion: Adult Male	The Whistling Butterflies: Mike and Pat Cooney (Edmonton, Alberta, Canada)	Clarence Gary Phifer with Sandra Henzler (Columbia, South Carolina)	
2007	Allied Arts Champion: Adult Female	Carole Kaufman (Pasadena, California)	Massae "Cristina" Toyohashi (Minuma-Ku, Saitama, Japan)	
2008	Male Grand Champion	Geert Chatrou (Mierlo, Netherlands)	Terry Rappold (Harahan, Louisiana)	
2008	Female Grand Champion	Carole Anne Kaufman (Monrovia, California)	Akiko Komano (Japan)	
2008	Senior Citizen Champion	Norihiro Okuba (Japan)	Masanobu Shiraiwa (Japan)	
2008	Teenage Grand Champion	Narumi Nakata (Japan)	Ario Nozawa (Japan)	
2008	Grand Children's Champion	Chihaya Kosugiyama (Japan)	Yūdai Takenaka (Japan)	
2008	Allied Arts Champion:	Cao Qing Yao (China)	Mitsuhiro Mori (Japan)	
2009	Male Grand Champion	Luke Janssen (New York City, New York)	Geert Chatrou (Mierlo, Netherlands)	
2009	Female Grand Champion	Carole Anne Kaufman (Monrovia, California)	Kimiko Wakiyama	
2009	Teenage Female Champion	Narumi Nakata (Japan)	Cassidy Osgood (Louisburg, North Carolina)	
2009	Teenage Male Champion	Yūdai Takenaka (Japan)		
2009	Grand Children's Champion	Takehiro Ishihara (Japan)	Robby Hood (St. Louis, Missouri)	
2009	Allied Arts Champion Adult Male	Asim Gorashi (Woodridge, Queensland, Australia)		
2009	Allied Arts Champion Adult Female	Carole Anne Kaufman (Monrovia, California)		
2010	Male Grand Champion	Tormod Borgen (Rogne, Norway)	Dong Chen (China)	
2010	Female Grand Champion	Akiko Shibata (Japan)	Naho Yube (Japan)	
2010	Senior Male Grand Champion – Classical	Boqing Li (China)	Qingjun Han (China)	
2010	Senior Male Grand Champion – Popular	Bo Seo Hwang (Korea)	Ming Sun (China)	
2010	Senior Female Grand Champion – Classical and Popular	Patricia Sonnier (United States)		
2010	Teenage Grand Champion	Yuki Takeda (Japan)	Yūdai Takenaka (Japan)	
2010	Grand Children's Champion	Qianhe Li (China)	Yong Gen (China)	
2010	Allied Arts Champion Male	Boxue Tian (China)	Yong Gen (China)	
2010	Allied Arts Champion Female	Naruchans: Narumi Nakata, Akiko Shibata, Naho Yube, and Takagi Mariko (Japan)	Whistling Duet: Akiko Shibata and Takagi Mariko (Japan)	
2010	Allied Arts Champion Children and Teen	Aisha Kanai (Japan)	Yuki Takeda (Japan)	
2011	International Male Grand Champion	Terry Rappold (Harahan, Louisiana)	Michael Bravin (Maryland)	
2011	Female Grand Champion	Damariscotta Helm (Rocky Mount, North Carolina)	Carole Ann Kaufman (Monrovia, California)	
2011	Allied Arts Champion Male	Tim Eggert		
2011	Allied Arts Champion Female	Damariscotta Helm (Rocky Mount, North Carolina)		
2011	Teenage Male Grand Champion	Yuki Takeda (Japan)		
2011	Teenage Female Grand Champion	Caren Irgang (Nyack, New York)		
2011	Grand Children's Champion	Everette Oba (Chiba, Japan)	Marley Kelly (Franklin County, North Carolina)	
2011	Franklin County Children's Champion	Marley Kelly (Franklin County, North Carolina)	Justin House (Franklin County, North Carolina)	
2012	Male Grand Champion	Sean Lomax (Murrieta, California)	Luc Vitry (Boston, Massachusetts)	
2012	Female Grand Champion	Akiko Shibata (Japan)	Damariscotta Helm (Rocky Mount, North Carolina)	
2012	Teenage Male Grand Champion	Pablo Leano		
2012	Teenage Female Grand Champion	Narumi Nakata (Japan)	Mizuho Takata	
2012	Grand Children's Champion	Everett Oba	Soumya Kaluri	
2012	Allied Arts Champion Male	Todd Dickerson (Hickory, North Carolina)	Eric Aranow	
2012	Allied Arts Champion Female	Marie Ivassich	Akiko Shibata (Japan)	
2013	Male Grand Champion	Qingyue Cao (China)	Jeffrey Amos (Toronto, Canada)	
2013	Female Grand Champion	Mariko Takagi (Japan)		
2013	Teenage Male Grand Champion	Yūdai Takenaka (Japan)		
2013	Teenage Female Grand Champion	Marina Kato (Japan)		
2013	Grand Children's Champion	Yuan Cao (China)		
2014	Male Grand Champion	Romu Aoyagi (Tokyo, Japan)	Yuki Takeda (Tokyo, Japan)	
2014	Female Grand Champion	Mariko Takagi (Fukushima, Japan)	Narumi Nakata (Hyogo, Japan)	
2014	Allied Arts Champion	Edgar Moreyra (Caracas, Venezuela)	Yuki Takeda (Tokyo, Japan)	
