= Silton (disambiguation) =

Silton is a village in Dorset, England.

Silton may also refer to :

== Places ==
- Silton, Saskatchewan village
- Nether Silton, English village of North Yorkshire
- Over Silton, English village of North Yorkshire

== People ==
- Henry Silton Harris (1926-2007), British-Canadian philosopher
- Susan Silton (born 1956), American interdisciplinary artist
