= Erich Kunzel =

American orchestra conductor (1935–2009)

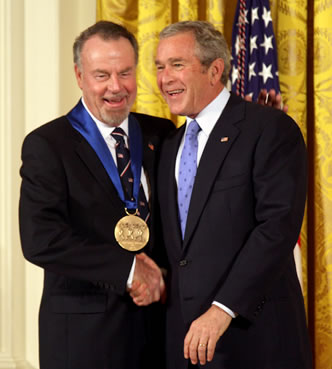
- Erich Kunzel (left) receives the 2006 National Medal of Arts from President George W. Bush (right) at a 2007 ceremony.

Background information
- Born: March 21, 1935; New York City, United States
- Died: September 1, 2009 (aged 74) Bar Harbor, Maine, United States
- Genre: Classical
- Occupation: Conductor

Erich Kunzel Jr. (March 21, 1935 – September 1, 2009) was an American orchestra conductor. Called the "Prince of Pops" by the Chicago Tribune, he performed with a number of leading pops and symphony orchestras, and led the Cincinnati Pops Orchestra (CPO) for 32 years.

== Early life and career ==
Kunzel was born to German-American immigrant parents in New York City. At Greenwich High School in Connecticut, he arranged music and played the piano, string bass and timpani. Initially a chemistry major, Kunzel graduated from Dartmouth College with a degree in music, where he was a member of Phi Delta Theta, then studied at Harvard and Brown universities. He conducted the Brown University Glee Club for at least two years. Early in his career, he conducted for the Santa Fe Opera and studied at the Pierre Monteux School. He met his Austrian-born wife, Brunhilde, while conducting Gianni Schicchi for Santa Fe in 1964, and they married a year later. From 1960 to 1965, he conducted the Rhode Island Philharmonic. From 1965 to 1977, Kunzel served as resident conductor of the Cincinnati Symphony Orchestra (CSO).

In 1969, he was initiated as an honorary member of the Eta-Omicron chapter of Phi Mu Alpha Sinfonia music fraternity at the College-Conservatory of Music at the University of Cincinnati. He was also a National Patron of Delta Omicron, an international professional music fraternity.

== The Pops ==
In 1965, Kunzel began the country's first winter pops series, the "8 O'Clock Pops". When the Cincinnati Symphony Orchestra board of trustees created the Cincinnati Pops Orchestra in 1977, Kunzel was named conductor. The Pops became the larger of Cincinnati's two orchestras, as all of Max Rudolf's symphony orchestra also played for the Pops year-round. At the invitation of Arthur Fiedler in 1970, Kunzel guest-conducted over 100 concerts with the Boston Pops Orchestra. He remained active with symphony, leading the Indianapolis Symphony Orchestra (as Principal Pops Conductor) from 1982 to 2002.

From the beginning, Kunzel strove to expand the Cincinnati Pops' reach worldwide, with nearly 90 recordings on the Telarc label, most of which became bestsellers. His popular recordings of classical music, Broadway musicals, and movie scores topped worldwide crossover charts more than any other conductor or orchestra in the world. Some of Kunzel's mentees at the Cincinnati Pops would later become notable in their own right, including Keith Lockhart of the Boston Pops and Steven Reineke of The New York Pops.

The Cincinnati Pops were especially popular in Asia. The group toured Japan several times, starting in 1990. In 1998, Kunzel became the first American pops conductor to perform in China. Ten years later, he and the Cincinnati Pops were invited back to perform at the 2008 Summer Olympics in Beijing; they were the only American orchestra to play at the event.

Kunzel made most of his classical music recordings as director of the Cincinnati Pops. However, he also made jazz recordings with Dave Brubeck, Duke Ellington, and other well-known artists. From the Capitol Building lawn, Kunzel conducted the National Symphony Orchestra every Memorial Day and Fourth of July from 1991 to 2009, in concerts televised nationwide on PBS. In 1987, his Aaron Copland: Lincoln Portrait (CD-80117) album with narration by Katharine Hepburn including Old American Songs sung by Sherrill Milnes received a Grammy nomination. Other Grammy nominations came in 1989 (A Disney Spectacular), 1991 (Meredith Willson's The Music Man), and 1993 (Amen!--A Gospel Celebration). The album American Jubilee won the Grand Prix du Disque in 1989. His albums frequently feature digital sound effects created by Michael Bishop.

The conductor had a large influence on Cincinnati's local music scene. In addition to conducting almost weekly subscription concerts with the Cincinnati Pops, he expanded the Pops program in 1984 to include a summer concert series at the newly built Riverbend Music Center on the banks of the Ohio River. He pushed for a new campus to house the city's public School for Creative and Performing Arts. He invited many local performers, including children's choruses and College-Conservatory students, to share the stage with the Pops.

The recording engineer for Kunzel's recording of music by Copland earned a Grammy Award for Best Engineered Album, Classical in 1998, for Copland: The Music of America, Kunzel earned the 2006 National Medal of Arts. In 2009, he was inducted into the American Classical Music Hall of Fame, based in Cincinnati.

On June 20–21, 2008, Kunzel conducted The Toronto Symphony Orchestra's performance of Star Trek: The Music at Roy Thomson Hall in Toronto.

== Last days ==
In April 2009, Kunzel was diagnosed with pancreatic, liver and colon cancer and received chemotherapy treatments in Cincinnati. He conducted a final concert at Riverbend on August 1, 2009, and died a month later in Bar Harbor, Maine, near his home at Swan's Island. That day, the CSO board of trustees posthumously named him "Founder and Conductor Emeritus" of the Pops.

== Discography ==
Decca recordings with the Cincinnati Symphony:

- Duke Ellington - Orchestral Works (1970)

MCA recordings with the Cincinnati Symphony:

- Dave Brubeck Trio, Gerry Mulligan - Elementals (1971)

Turnabout recordings with the Cincinnati Pops:

- American Fantasia (1978)
- Pomp & Circumstance (1978)
- A Portrait Of George: Gershwin On Broadway & In Hollywood (1979)
- Jacques Offenbach - Overtures (1979)

Caedmon recordings with the Cincinnati Pops:

- Peter And The Wolf and Tubby The Tuba, with Carol Channing (Sergei Prokofiev; George Kleinsinger, Paul Tripp) (1979)

Telarc recordings with the Cincinnati Symphony:

- Tchaikovsky 1812, with Kiev Symphony Chorus, Children's Choir of Greater Cincinnati (1979) [reissued in 2001 credited to Cincinnati Pops; cover nearly the same otherwise]
- George Gershwin - Rhapsody in Blue/An American in Paris (1981)
- Ludwig van Beethoven: Wellington's Victory/Franz Liszt: Battle of the Huns (1983)

MMG recordings:

- Peter and the Wolf narrated by Don Harron/The Ugly Duckling sung by June Anderson, Cincinnati Pops (1981)
- An Evening With Rodgers & Hammerstein, The Winnipeg Symphony Orchestra Chorus & Soloists featuring Mark Pedrotti (1982)

Vox Prima recordings with the Cincinnati Pops:

- Dances from the Opera (1983)

Vox Cum Laude recordings with the Cincinnati Pops:

- Music Of Waldteufel (1983)
- An International Salute (1984)
- Jacques Offenbach: Concerto Rondo; Four Orchestral Pieces featuring Ofra Harnoy, Philip Collins (1984)
- Peaches And Cream - John Philip Sousa Dances And Marches (1984)
- Jacques Offenbach – Vive La France! [2 disc compilation] (1994)

Fanfare recordings with The Winnipeg Symphony:

- Kunzel on Broadway (George Gershwin; Jerome Kern, Oscar Hammerstein II; Cole Porter; Jerry Herman; Meredith Willson; Frederick Loewe, Alan Jay Lerner) (1985)

Telarc recordings with the Cincinnati Pops:

- Star Tracks (Frank Proto; John Williams; Alexander Courage) (1984)
- Time Warp (Don Dorsey; Johann Strauss II; Jerry Goldsmith; Alexander Courage; Stu Phillips; John Williams; Aram Khachaturian) (1984)
- Ein Straussfest: Waltzes, Polkas & Marches of the Strauss Family, featuring King Keyes (zither) (Johann Strauss II; Johann Strauss I, Josef Strauss; Eduard Strauss) (1985) [recording of On the Beautiful Blue Danube is the same as the one on Time Warp]
- Orchestral Spectaculars (Nikolai Rimsky-Korsakov; Paul Dukas; Jaromir Weinberger; Camille Saint-Saëns; Franz Liszt) (1985)
- The Stokowski Sound: Transcriptions for Orchestra by Leopold Stokowski (Johann Sebastian Bach; Luigi Boccherini; Claude Debussy; Ludwig van Beethoven; Isaac Albeniz; Sergei Rachmaninoff; Modest Mussorgsky) (1986) [reissued in 1994 with two new tracks, by Johannes Brahms and Modest Mussorgsky, as The Fantastic Stokowski]
- William Tell and Other Favorite Overtures (Franz von Suppé; Daniel-François Auber; Louis Joseph Hérold; Emil von Reznicek; Jacques Offenbach; Gioacchino Rossini (1986)
- Round-Up, featuring Frankie Laine, Men of The May Festival Chorus directed by John Leman, Ron McCroby (Gioachino Rossini; Elmer Bernstein; Franz Waxman; Christopher Palmer, Jay Livingston, Ray Evans, Dimitri Tiomkin, Ned Washington, Jerome Moross, Herschel Burke-Gilbert; Alfred Newman; Richard Hayman; Jerome Moross; Bruce Broughton) (1986)
- Star Tracks II (John Williams; Alan Silvestri; Jerry Goldsmith; James Horner; Leonard Rosenman; Henry Mancini; Don Dorsey; Bill Conti) (1987)
- Hollywood's Greatest Hits Volume I featuring William Tritt (Alfred Newman; Erich Wolfgang Korngold; Max Steiner; Miklós Rósza; Ernest Gold; Maurice Jarre; Nino Rota; Francis Lai; John Williams; Michel Legrand; Bill Conti; Michael Gore; John Barry; Vangelis, Donald Rose) (1987)
- Pomp & Pizazz (John Williams; Josef Suk; Edward Elgar; John Ireland; Piotr Ilyich Tchaikovsky; Hector Berlioz; Josef Franz Wagner; Julius Fučik; John Philip Sousa, Leopold Stokowski; Richard Hayman, George Gershwin, Meredith Willson, Bob Haggart & Ray Baduc) (1987)
- Ferde Grofé: Grand Canyon Suite • George Gershwin: Porgy & Bess/Symphonic Suite "Catfish Row" (1987)
- Aaron Copland: Lincoln Portrait featuring Katharine Hepburn/Old American Songs featuring Sherill Milnes (1987)
- Symphonic Spectacular (Dmitri Shostakovich; Richard Wagner; Manuel De Falla; Georges Bizet; Armas Järnefelt; Emmanuel Chabrier; Piotr Ilyich Tchaikovsky; Johan Halvorsen; Georges Enesco (sic); Aram Khachaturian) (1988)
- The Big Band Hit Parade, with Ray Brown, Dave Brubeck, Cab Calloway, Eddie Davis, Buddy Morrow, Gerry Mulligan, Doc Severinsen, Ed Shaughnessy (1988)
- Richard Rodgers: The Sound of Music, with Frederica von Stade, Håkan Hagegård and Eileen Farrell, (1988)
- George Gershwin: Rhapsody In Blue / Concerto In F, featuring William Tritt, Cincinnati Jazz Orchestra (1988)
- American Jubilee (John Williams; Richard Hayman; Charles Ives, William Schuman; Louis Moreau Gottschalk, Hershy Kay; George Chadwick; Daniel Emmett (1988)
- Chiller, featuring Robert Muckenfuss (Michael Bishop; Andrew Lloyd Webber; Modest Mussorgsky, Nikolai Rimsky-Korsakov; Camille Saint-Saëns; Hector Berlioz; Edvard Grieg; Rosalind Ilett; Marius Constant; Franz Waxman, Steven R. Bernstein; Bernard Hermann; John Addison; Jerry Goldsmith; Henry Mancini; Charles Gounod) (August 10, 1989)
- Mancini's Greatest Hits (1989)
- Victory at Sea War and Remembrance Casablanca And Other Favorites (Richard Rodgers, Robert Russell Bennett; Robert Cobert; Max Steiner; Kenneth Alford; Richard Addinsell; Ron Goodwin; George M. Cohan; Paul Anka; Jerry Goldsmith; Richard Hayman, Robert M. Crawford, Jacques Offenbach, Henry C. Davis, Francis Saltus van Boskerck, Edmund L. Gruber, Charles A. Zimmerman, Alfred H. Miles, Royal Lovell) (1989)
- A Disney Spectacular, featuring His Master’s Voice, Tracy Dahl, Douglas Webster, Indiana University Singing Hoosiers directed by Robert E. Stoll, School for the Creative and Performing Arts Children's Chorus directed by Deborah N. Barry, May Festival Chorus directed by John H. Williams (Ned Washington, Leigh Harline; Richard M. Sherman, Robert B. Sherman; Bob Hilliard, Sammy Fain; Mack David, Jay Livingston, Al Hoffman; Terry Gilkyson; Frank Churchill, Ann Ronell; Frank Churchill, Larry Morey; Jimmie Dodd; Gershon Kingsley, Jean Jacques Perrey; Ray Gilbert, Allie Wrubel; Sammy Cahn, Sammy Fain; Oliver Wallace; Peggy Lee, Sonny Burke; Sammy Fain, Jack Lawrence, Piotr Ilyich Tchaikovsky) (May 22, 1989)
- Happy Trails: Round-Up 2, featuring Gene Autry, Sherill Milnes, Roy Rogers (October 9, 1989)
- Trumpet Spectacular featuring Doc Severinsen (Hermann Bellstedt arr. Christopher Fazzi; Gioacchino Rossini arr. Erich Kunzel; Jeremiah Clarke; Johann Sebastian Bach arr. Erich Kunzel; Nikolai Rimsky-Korsakov arr. Erich Kunzel; Georges Bizet arr. Frank Proto; Giacomo Puccini arr. Christopher Fazzi; Robert Schumann arr. Kunzel; Del Staigers orch. Christopher Fazzi; Leroy Anderson; Johann Sebastian Bach arr. Christopher Fazzi) (March 15, 1990)
- Classics of the Silver Screen featuring Richard Leech (Jean-Joseph Mouret; Johann Pachelbel; Giacomo Puccini, Giuseppe Adami, Renato Simoni; Wolfgang Amadeus Mozart; George Frideric Handel; Sergei Rachmaninoff; Pietro Mascagni, Giovanni Targioni-Tozzetti, Guido Menasci; Franz Liszt; Antonín Dvořák, Jaroslav Kvapil; Alfredo Catalani, Luigi Illica; Antonio Vivaldi; Giacomo Puccini, Luigi Illica, Giuseppe Giacosa; Giacomo Puccini, Giovacchino Forzano; Samuel Barber) (1990)
- Fantastic Journey, featuring the School for the Creative and Performing Arts Children's Chorus directed by Deborah N. Berry (Danny Elfman; Bernard Herrmann; Leith Stevens; John Barry; Paul Freeman; Jerry Goldsmith; Bruce Broughton; Lee Holdridge; Alex North; John Williams; Craig Safan) (1990)
- Christmas with the Pops, featuring Rosemary Clooney, Sherrill Milnes, Doc Severinsen, Toni Tenille, May Festival Chorus directed by Robert Porco, School for the Creative and Performing Arts Children's Chorus conducted by Deborah N. Berry, Stephen Van Dyck, First Presbyterian Church of Fort Thomas Bell Choir directed by Becky Bell (Carmen Dragon; Thomas Oliphant (uncredited); Felix Bernard; Mel Tormé; Bruce Healey, Haven Gillespie & Fred Coots, Gene Autry & Oakley Haldeman; John D. Marks, Steve Nelson & Walter Rollins, James S. Pierpont (sic); Irving Berlin; Mykola Leontovich, Peter Wilhousky; Noel Regney, Gloria Shayne; Sammy Cahn, Jule Styne; Felix Mendelssohn; Tommy Newsom; Frank Proto; Howard Blake; Leroy Anderson; Ralph Blaney, Hugh Martin; Adolphe Adam, John Sullivan Dwight; Joseph Mohr, Franz Gruber) (October 8, 1990)
- ¡Fiesta!, with Doc Severinsen, Los Caminantes Mariachi Band (1990)
- Movie Love Themes (Dave Grusin; Alex North; Stephen Sondheim; John Barry; John Williams; Paul Williams, Barbra Streisand; Irene Cara, Giorgio Moroder, Keith Forsey; Lalo Schifrin, Will Jennings; Willy Russell; Burt Bacharach; Marvin Hamlisch; Angelo Badalamenti; Maurice Jarre; Stanley Myers; Marvin Hamilish, Alan and Marilyn Bergman) (1991)
- Pops Plays Puccini (Puccini Without Words): Arrangements for Orchestra – Selections from Giacomo Puccini's Operas adapted and orchestrated by Crafton Beck, Steven Bernstein, and Erich Kunzel (March 14, 1991)
- Bond and Beyond (John Barry; Monty Norman; Danny Elfman; Ennio Morricone; Jerry Goldsmith; Walter Schumann; Henry Mancini; Fred Steiner; Bronislau Kaper; Mike Post; Lalo Schifrin; Jan Hammer; Morton Stevens; Paul McCartney; Bill Conti; Harold Faltermeyer; Michael Kamen; Marvin Hamlisch; Isaac Hayes) (1991)
- Down on the Farm (1991)
- Jacques Offenbach: Gaîté Parisienne; Jacques Ibert: Divertissement (1992)
- Unforgettably Doc, with Doc Severinsen (1992)
- Rodgers and Hammerstein: Songbook for Orchestra (January 28, 1992)
- Young at Heart, with Patti Page, Bob McGrath, Mel Tormé (1992)
- Sailing, featuring Roger Williams, William Tritt, Philip Collins, The Village Waytes (Jolynda Bowers, Mark Dietrich, Thom Mariner, Vera Mariner, Michael Oxley) with Thomas Bankston, Neal Hamlin, Amy E. Hill, Steven D. Jones, Rita Larkin, David Lohman, Joe Miller, Jill R. Pearon, Anthony Turner, Tommy Tutwiler, Jeannie Vail directed by J. David Moore (Christopher Cross; Lee Holdridge; John Barry; Antonio Carlos Jobim; Alan Menken; Dave Grusin; Robert Maxwell, Carl Sigman, Roger Williams; Eric Knight; Charles Trenet; Neil Diamond, Lee Holdridge; Erik Darling, Bob Carey, Alan Arkin; Jack Lawrence, Eric Coates; Steve Cropper, Otis Redding; Johnny Pearson; Jimmy Buffett, John Bambridge; John Denver) (1992)
- American Piano Classics, featuring Stewart Goodyear, William Tritt (Leroy Anderson; Scott Joplin; Morton Gould; Euday L. Bowman; Louis Moreau Gottschalk; George Gershwin) (January 26, 1993)
- Amen!: A Gospel Celebration, featuring Jennifer Holliday, Maureen McGovern, Lou Rawls, Azusa Pacific University Choir conducted by William Henry Caldwell, Cincinnati Pops Chorale (Janet Burnett, Peggy J. Gibbs, Terri McCoy, M. Jo Patrick, Priscilla C. Devaney, Sally V. Harper, Brenda J. Hartman, Keren Husman, Cynthia A. Mills, Rick Davis, H. Scott Nesbitt, Dave Weidle, Charles K. Wells, Timothy R. Breithaupt, Brian D. Griffin, Jim Racster) (William Spivery; Steven V. Taylor, Don Hart; Gary Geld, Peter Joell; Julie Gold; Stephen Schwartz; Bill Withers, Bruce Healey; Albert E. Brumley, O.D. Hall, Jr.; Gene MacLellan; Hoyt Axton; Bob Krogstad; Paul Simon; Mike Renzi) (1993)
- Ein Straussfest II, featuring Cincinnati Pops Chorale (Johann Strauss I; Johann Strauss II; Josef Strauss; Eduard Strauss) (1993)
- Meredith Willson's The Music Man, story by Meredith Willson & Franklin Lacey, with Timothy Noble, Kathleen Brett, Doc Severinsen, Steven Dauterman, James Racster, Stephen Grant, Timothy Breithaupt, Stephen Madaris, Lewis Dahle von Schalnbusch, Patsy Meyer, Neil Jones, Scott Brannon, Richard Rebilas, Michael Bell, Janet Burnett, Carol Fullman, Ann Siverly, James Thomas Hodges, Indiana University Singing Hoosiers directed by Robert E. Stoll (1993)
- Hollywood's Greatest Hits Volume II, featuring Julie Spangler, Frank Proto, Bill Platt, Jeanne Dulaney, Paul Patterson, Tim Berens (Alex North; Miklós Rósza; Elmer Bernstein; Dimitri Tiomkin; Will Hudson, George Duning; Victor Young; Bronislau Kaper; Mikis Theodorakis; Michel Legrand; André Previn; John Barry; Nino Rota; Charles Chaplin; Enya; James Newton Howard) (June 29, 1993)
- Lerner & Loewe: Songbook for Orchestra (1994)
- The Great Fantasy Adventure Album, featuring Timothy Berens, May Festival Chorus directed by Robert Porco featuring Brian Horne, with John Birge, Charles Pagnard, Paul Piller, Marc Wolfley, Fred Thiergartner, Heather MacPhail, Marcia Labella, Juliet Stratton, Elizabeth Motter (Miklós Rósza; John Williams; Michael Kamen; Patrick Doyle; James Horner; Bernard Herrmann; Alan Silvestri; Laurence Rosenthal; Danny Elfman; Jerry Goldsmith; Mark Knopfler; Lee Holdridge; Basil Poledouris; Michael Bishop, Scott Burgess, Tom Letizia; Brad Fiedel, Julie Spangler) (1994)
- The Very Best of Erich Kunzel and the Cincinnati Pops – Top 20, featuring Frankie Laine, Doc Severinson, Eddie Daniels, Ed Shaughnessy, Richard Leech, Robert Muckenfuss, Paul Patterson, Tim Berens, Jeanne Dulaney, Central State University Chorus (Christopher Palmer, Jay Livingston, Ray Evans, Dimitri Tiomkin, Ned Washington, Jerome Moross, Herschel Burke-Gilbert; Richard Strauss, Jerry Goldsmith; Louis Prima, Tommy Newsom; Max Steiner; Alex North, Patrick Russ; Giacomo Puccini, [Giuseppe Adami, Renato Simoni]; Johann Sebastian Bach, Leopold Stokowski; Frank Proto, John Williams; Danny Elfman; Ferde Grofé; John Barry, Nic Raine; Andrew Lloyd Webber; Nino Rota, Mark McGurty; Henry Mancini; Giacomo Puccini, Steven Bernstein, Erich Kunzel, Crafton Beck; Eduard Strauss; Bob Krogstad; Michael Bishop, Scott Burgess, Tom Letizia; Brad Fiedel, Julie Spangler) (September 27, 1994) [compilation—a limited release included a promotional copy of Meredith Willson's The Music Man as a bonus shrinkwrapped in full jewel case]
- Verdi Without Words: Grand Opera for Orchestra – Selections from the Operas of Giuseppe Verdi (1813–1901) Adapted, orchestrated, and arranged by Erich Kunzel and Crafton Beck (January 24, 1995)
- The Magical Music of Disney, arranged with Danny Troob, featuring Darryl Phinnesee, Susie Stevens Logan, Annie Livingstone, Camille Saviola, with Paul Piller, Tim Berens, Michael Chertock, Scott Lang, Marc Wolfley, Jeanne Dulaney, Michael Kenyon, Paul Patterson; Indiana University Singing Hoosiers conducted by Robert E. Stoll. Additional chorus from the film cast of The Lion King: Jim Gilstrap, Clydene Jackson, Rich Logan, Myrna Mathews, Darryl Phinnessee, Josef Powell, Sally Stevens, Carmen Twillie, Julia Waters, Maxine Waters, Oren Waters, Terry Young (Hans Zimmer, Elton John, Tim Rice; Alan Menken, Howard Ashman, Tim Rice) (1995)
- Puttin’ on the Ritz: The Great Hollywood Musicals, featuring Frederica von Stade, Michael Feinstein, Jerry Hadley, Lee Roy Reams, Bobby Short, Leslie Uggams, Jeremy Davenport, The Osborne Sisters: Esther Mullens, Georga Osborne, Valerie Wilson; Indiana University Singing Hoosiers directed by Robert E. Stoll featuring Jason Burke, Branch Fields, Edward C. Hayes, David C. Starkey, Alison Streeter; Kiki Bussell, Lui-Jia Wu, Michael Andres, Jim Sherrick, Herb Aronoff, Joseph Gaudio, Larry Dickson, Charles Pagnard, Paul Piller, Frank Proto, Tim Berens, Ed Shaughnessy (Howard Dietz, Arthur Schwartz; Irving Berlin; E.Y. Harburg, Harold Arlen; Al Dubin, Harry Warren; Arthur Freed, Nacio Herb Brown; Lorenz Hart, Richard Rodgers; Don Raye, Hughie Prince; Herb Magidson, Con Conrad; Ira Gershwin, George Gershwin; Cole Porter; Johnny Mercer, Harry Warren; Dorothy Fields, Jerome Kern; Leo Robin, Ralph Rainger) (September 26, 1995) (originally released in a Limited Edition 24 Carat Gold at Normal CD pricing)
- Symphonic Star Trek: Music of the Motion Pictures and Television Series featuring Leonard Nimoy (Russ Lindway; Jerry Goldsmith; Michael Bishop; Cliff Eidelman; Dennis McCarthy; Leonard Rosenman; Alexander Courage; James Horner) (April 23, 1996) [partially a compilation of previously released recordings along with newly recorded material]
- Viennese Violin, featuring Robert McDuffie (Franz Lehár; Fritz Kreisler; Johann Strauss II; Rudolf Sieczynski) (1996)
- Andrew Lloyd Webber (January 23, 1996)
- Aaron Copland: The Music Of America (January 28, 1997)
- Beautiful Hollywood (Alan Silvestri; Mark Isham; Carter Burwell; Nancy Wilson; James Horner; Andrew Lloyd Webber, Tim Rice; Lennie Niehaus; Ennio Morricone; Alan Menken, Stephen Schwartz; Basil Poledouris; Jerry Goldsmith; John Barry; John Williams; Randy Edelman) (September 23, 1997)
- The Big Picture (Danny Elfman; Elliot Goldenthal; James Horner; Mark Mancina; Hans Zimmer; David Arnold; Trevor Jones; Randy Edelman; Jerry Goldsmith) (1997)
- Gershwin Centennial Edition (The Complete Orchestral Collection) (May 26, 1998)
- Play Ball! with Maria Muldaur, James Earl Jones (1998)
- From the Heart (1998)
- George Gershwin: Selections from Porgy and Bess, Blue Monday (World Premiere Recording: Original Version) (1998)
- On Broadway (Barry Mann, Cynthia Weil, Jerry Leiber, Mike Stoller; Claude-Michel Schönberg, Richard Maltby Jr.; Mark Mancina; Lucy Simon, Marsha Norman; Cy Coleman, David Zippel; Stephen Sondheim) (1999)
- The Great Movie Scores from the Films of Steven Spielberg, with Timothy Berens, Michael Turk Richards, School For Creative And Performing Arts Chorale, Sylvia Mitchell, Michael Kenyon, Randolph Bowman, Duane Duggar, Alexander Kerr, Walnut Hills High School Senior Choir (John Williams; Jerry Goldsmith; Quincy Jones) (January 26, 1999)
- Route 66 - That Nelson Riddle Sound (2000)
- Mega Movies (Jerry Goldsmith; James Horner; Bob Badami, Hans Zimmer, Nick Glennie-Smith; Alan Silvestri; Hans Zimmer, Stephen Schwartz; David Hirschfelder; David Arnold; Stephen Warbeck; Trevor Rabin) (2000)
- Viennafest (Eduard Strauss; Emmerich Kálmán; Franz Lehár; Johann Strauss II; Johann Strauss I; Josef Lanner; Oscar Straus; Robert Stolz; Rudolf Sieczynski) (October 24, 2000)
- The Best of Gershwin, featuring William Tritt, Harolyn Blackwell, John O'Conor (2001)
- Perform the Music of The Beatles featuring The King'Singers (John Lennon, Paul McCartney; George Harrison; Richard Starkey) (2001)
- Nice 'N' Easy (Celebrating Sinatra) (2001)
- Scary Music (Danny Elfman; Vic Mizzy; Mike Oldfield; Elmer Bernstein; John Michael Spirt, Robert Lawrence Rappaport, Steve Millman Rappaport; Bobby Pickett; Wendy Carlos, Rachel Elkind; Rod Temperton; Jerry Goldsmith; Robert Cobert; Burt Bacharach, Mack David; Gordon Goodwin, Paul Sundfor, John DeBello) (2002)
- A Celtic Spectacular, featuring James Galway, Kieran O'Hare, Silver Arm (2002)
- Got Swing! with special guests The Manhattan Transfer, John Pizzarelli; Janis Siegel, Antonio Hart; Mike Sharfe, Richie Goods (2003)
- Epics (Richard Strauss; Miklós Rósza; Hans Zimmer; Max Steiner; Tan Dun; Alex North; Maurice Jarre; Howard Shore; John Williams; Elmer Bernstein) (2003)
- Ballet Favorites, featuring Gillian Benet Sella (Adolphe Adam; Aram Khachaturian; Dmitry Kabalevsky; Dmitri Shostakovich; Frédéric Chopin; Igor Stravinsky; Jacques Offenbach; Léo Delibes; Léon Minkus, Manuel de Falla, Paul Dukas, Pyotr Ilyich Tchaikovsky, Reinhold Glière) (2004)
- Classics at the Pops (Aaron Copland; Camille Saint-Saëns; Ottorino Respighi; Ralph Vaughan Williams; Giuseppe Verdi; Claude Debussy; Edward Elgar; Hector Berlioz; Jaromir Weinberger; Dmitri Shostakovich) (October 26, 2004)
- Miklós Rósza: Three Choral Suites, with the Mormon Tabernacle Choir (April 26, 2005)
- Howard Hanson: Bold Island Suite (world premiere recording) • Symphony No. 2, "Romantic" • Suite from Merry Mount (September 27, 2005)
- The Never-Ending Waltz (2006)
- Russian Nights (2006)
- Great Film Fantasies (John Williams; Howard Shore) (2006)
- Christmastime Is Here, with Ann Hampton Callaway, Tony DeSare, King's Singers, John Pizzarelli, Tierney Sutton, Indiana University Singing Hoosiers directed by Michael Schwarzkopf (September 26, 2006)
- Masters And Commanders - Music From Seafaring Classics featuring Eric Kim, Timothy Lees (Alfred Newman; Klaus Badelt; Hans Zimmer; Erich Wolfgang Korngold; Luigi Boccherini; Elmer Bernstein; Franz Waxman; Henry Mancini; Bronislau Kaper; Morton Gould; John Debney) (July 24, 2007)
- Piotr Ilyich Tchaikovsky: Nutcracker: Favorite Selections (September 25, 2007)
- Boléro (Maurice Ravel; Alexander Borodin; Georges Bizet; Isaac Albeniz) (April 22, 2008)
- Vintage Cinema (Max Steiner; Erich Wolfgang Korngold; Miklós Rósza; Aaron Copland; Franz Waxman; Leonard Bernstein; Bernard Herrmann; Elmer Bernstein) (October 28, 2008)
- From the Top at the Pops featuring Christopher O'Riley and America's Best Young Classical Musicians: Caroline Goulding, Chad Hoopes, Corey Dundee, Hilda Huang, Ji-Yong, Matthew Allen (David Popper; Edvard Grieg; Felix Mendelssohn, Johann Sebastian Bach, Max Bruch, Russell Peck) (August 25, 2009)

Pro Arte recordings with the Rochester Pops

- Christmas At The Pops (Leroy Anderson; Georges Bizet; Victor Herbert; Leopold Mozart; Wolfgang Amadeus Mozart; Mark Leontovich [Mykola Leontovich]; Emil Waldteufel; Piotr Ilyich Tchaikovsky; Johann Strauss II; Felix Bernard) (1985)
- Syncopated Clock (And Other Favorites By Leroy Anderson) (1986) (issued in Japan as The Typewriter Song)
- Ties & Tails. Music Of Duke Ellington And George Gershwin (1986)
- A Night At The Pops (1987) (reissued on FirstChoice in 1991)
- An Enchanted Evening ...The Music Of Richard Rodgers (1987)

PAR recordings with the Houston Symphony

- Gerry Mulligan: Symphonic Dreams (1987)

Telarc recordings with Naples Philharmonic Orchestra

- Joaquin Rodrigo: Concierto De Aranjuez/Fantasía para un gentilhombre/Concierto para un fiesta featuring David Russell (1987)

== See also ==
- Paavo Järvi, Kunzel's counterpart at the Cincinnati Symphony Orchestra
- John Morris Russell, Kunzel's successor at the Cincinnati Pops, named in December 2010.

== Sources ==
- "Erich Kunzel" in Contemporary Musicians. Vol. 17. Gale Research, 1996.
- Thierstein. "Cincinnati Symphony Orchestra". In L. Macy (ed.). Grove Music Online. Archived from the original on May 16, 2008.
