= Marina Kato =

Marina Kato (born December 7th, 1998) is a Japanese singer and whistler.

== Early life and career ==
Marina Kato was born in Mito City in Ibaraki Prefecture, Japan. She started learning the violin in 1st grade where she was a student at Ibaraki University Elementary School. She was also a singer as a girl, performing in Mongolia in 5th grade. In high school, she was student council president.

Her parents told her growing up that if she ever whistled at home, spirits would be attracted to the house. However, in her second year of junior high school, she heard a boy whistling during class and whistled after him. Her friends were impressed and encouraged her talent. After that school day, she went home and showed her mom, who wanted her to try out for the International Whistlers Convention in Louisburg, North Carolina. Kato won first place for the Teenage Girl category in 2013.

In 2019, she whistled at Carnegie Hall in New York City. She made her debut as a singer on October 20, 2021, with the single "Nameless Station". The song was used as the ending theme for the TV Saitama information program "Machikomi".

== Personal life ==
She has a daughter named Karin. She has a lot of reptiles as pets and is a jockey.

She has a close relationship with Madame Dewi, having lived with her since 2020 and graduating from Asia University in 2021.
