= Whistle Taro =

Japanese musician

Whistle Taro (Real name Taro, September 20th, 1966) also known as Kuchibue Taro, is a Japanese jazz whistler and music producer.

== Early Life ==
Kuchibue was born in Takatsuki, Osaka Prefecture, Japan. He started whistling in late elementary school. He graduated from Kansai University First High School, and then Kansai University Faculty of Commerce.

== Career ==
In university, he was president in the light music club.

Taro whistled for Tomohiro's Railway Tour of China. He also records and performs live as part of the "Whistle Taro Duo" with guitarist Big McKnee Osato. However, he works for a company in Tokyo during the week, so his activities are generally limited to weekday evenings and weekends.

Since 2009, he has had a column called "Kuchibue Taro's Fusion Banzai" on the music information website "Warner Music Life," where he explains and introduces classic fusion albums. On the same site, he also writes a column introducing legendary artists who have birthdays in that month, as well as live reports on various artists, demonstrating his knowledge of Western music in general, not just jazz and fusion.

He also wrote the liner notes for Kimiko Wakiyama's major debut album, "Whistle Heaven," who is also a whistler.

== Disography ==
=== Whistle Taro Duo ===
==== album ====
- The Wind and the Guitar Case（November 3rd, 2007)
- Ghibli, guitar, and whistling.（March 9th, 2010)
- Plays the Beatles（February 9th, 2021)

=== Whistle Taro ＆RomiHi★ ===
- The Fox's Wedding（October 1st, 2025）

==== Other CD's ====
- The Elephant's Back (picture book) (December 2007) ...Includes a CD enclosed with the picture book.
- Wu Fang's "Kobe China Club" (released December 8, 2010) ... Album producer and also participated in the 12th track "Wish Upon a Star" with whistling, as well as playing percussion on several other tracks.
- "Nippon Jūdan Kokoro Tabi Original Soundtrack" (released September 21, 2011) ... Participated in two songs by whistling.
- "Nippon Jūdan Kokoro Tabi 2014 Original Soundtrack" (released June 25, 2014) ... Participated in two songs by whistling.
- Square Enix's official cover album of famous game songs, "SQ SWING" (released May 28, 2014), contributing whistling and sound production.
- "Dere Girls" (March 18, 2015).
- "TOKYO Decibel", whistling (May 17, 2017).

==== DVD ====
- The whistling background music from the DVD version of "Toro and the Movie"

==== Phone ringtones ====
- "Symphony No. 5" (Original cover version available as a free ringtone on " music.jp ")
- "Picnic" (Original cover version offered as a free ringtone on * "Artist Official Sound")
- "Shoten Theme", "Pirates of the Caribbean", "Miku Miku ni Shite Ageru" (original cover version provided as a ringtone for sale on " dwango ")

== See also ==
- Kimiko Wakiyama
