= Yuki Takeda =

Japanese whistler and youtuber

Yuki Takeda is a Japanese whistler, musician, and Youtuber from Tokyo, Japan. He won two categories in 2010 and one in 2011 performing at the International Whistlers Convention in Louisburg, North Carolina as a teenager before winning in 2014 as an adult.

== Early life ==
Takeda was born in Tokyo, Japan in 1992. His family moved to Toronto, Ontario in Canada when he was 7 due to his mom getting a teaching job at the University of Toronto. He learned how to whistle at age 10, after seeing friends do it and teaching himself by watching videos. During middle school, he traveled to The Netherlands for work, where he started whistling more serious due to boredom while at home. He returned to Japan for school and graduated from Tokyo Gakugei University Senior High School.

He originally went to the University of Tokyo before transferring to Middlebury College in Middlebury, Vermont, where he got his BA in African Studies and lived in Cameroon for a little bit during his studies. While at Middlebury, a senior project he did focused on whistling, performing at concerts and teaching different types of whistles for the Vermont Edition Summer School, including glissando, trills, and double tones—singing two notes at once.

== Career ==
When Takeda was 16, he saw the winners of a whistling competition being scored and interviewed on TBS's "Let's Go To School!" program, with one contestant catching his eye. The boy, who was named Takumi Gima, talked about being able to whistle three-octaves, which Takeda attempted and succeeded. While at Middlebury, he performed with his band, 'Yuki Takeda & Friends', where he whistled and also played the alto saxophone.

Growing up, Takeda learned different instruments including the acoustic guitar, piano, and cuatro. He was inspired by Yosuke Yamashita to get into jazz music and also is into Venezuelan Folk music. Other instruments he learned includes cajon, flute, and maracas.

In 2010, Takeda won the "Teen Division" in the International Whistlers Convention, where fellow whistler and the vocalist for the band Novelbright Yūdai Takenaka won with him.

Since 2022, Takeda was the organizer for the Global Whistling Championship.

In 2025, Takeda co-wrote a book 'Kuchibue no Hanashi', also known as 'The Story of Whistling', with non-fiction writer Hazuki Saiso (who ironically cannot whistle) about the history of whistling. Also in 2025, Takeda was one of the whistlers in the documentary "Whistle", which follows those who competes at the World Whistling Championship. Director Christopher Nelius made the film which was shown at the 50th annual Toronto International Film Festival.

On his Youtube Channel, Takeda posts whistling covers, tips on how to do different types of whistles, and collabs with different artists, including other whistlers like Taro Kuchibue and other musicians like Jorge Glem, Cheo Hurtado, and David Peña.

Takeda also performs in the group 'Two Cats Two Dogs'.

== Personal life ==
He has a wife who is originally from Singapore who both lived in the Philippines before the COVID-19 pandemic. By the time he was 20, Takeda could speak 5 different languages: English, French, Japanese, Portuguese, and Spanish.

Along with whistling, he also works at an animal healthcare company.
