= Tanguay Desgagné =

Canadian actor and whistler (born 1960)

Tanguay Desgagné is a Canadian actor and whistler from Gatineau, Quebec.

== Early life ==
Tanguay Desgagné was born on June 20, 1960 is Gatineau. He learned how to whistle at age 2.

Since 1992, he has been a professional whistler. He is a member of the Union des artistes as an actor and variety artist and the Guilde des musiciens et musiciennes du Québec as a whistler and trombonist. Also in 1992, he won second place at the International Whistlers Convention. In 1995, he won first place. He also won first place in 1993 and 1997.

He whistles musical pieces of all difficulty and styles across three octaves. He is a whistling actor and specializes in whistling performances of classical and popular music (film and television themes, concerts, commercials, etc.).

== Filmography ==
=== Movies ===
- 2002 : Alice's Odyssey by Denise Filiatrault, music by François Dompierre). (dubbed whistling of the 7 dwarves).

=== Television ===
- 1995 : Kid-Cam TV, by Maurice-André Aubin, Radio-Québec. (whistler) : Bach Invention #4 and rap music by Neil Smolar.
- 1999 : Juliette Pomerleau, by Claude Fournier, TVA, music by André Gagnon. (plays Rémi Prévost and whistles).
- 1999 : Cher Olivier, by André Melançon, TVA, music by François Dompierre. (whistles on the theme song.
- 2007 : Les Boys, by Louis Bolduc, Radio Canada. (dubbing whistling of the songs Eine kleine Nachtmusik by Mozart and Ô Canada.

== Personal life ==
He lives in Sherbrooke, Quebec and runs a workshop class on whistling.
