= Damariscotta Helm =

American competitive whistler

Damariscotta "Scottie" Helm is an American competitive whistler. She was selected as the World Whistling Grand Champion in 2011 at the 38th Annual International Whistlers Convention in Louisburg, North Carolina. The whistling competition includes competitors from around the world.

== Early life ==
Helm was born c. 1986 in Rocky Mount, North Carolina. She is the daughter of Carla and Bernard Helm. She is active in community theater in Rocky Mount.

Helm attended the Hebron Academy in Hebron, Maine. She attended North Carolina Wesleyan College where she majored in biology.

== Whistling ==
Helm has no formal training in whistling. Helm is the only known whistler in the world who performs the 'double whistle' where she can whistle two different notes simultaneously.

She first competed in the International Whistlers Convention in 2007, placing second and third in two divisions. In 2009, Helm made it to the finals in the 36th 39th International Whistlers Convention in Louisburg, North Carolina.

She was selected as the World Whistling Grand Champion in 2011 at the 38th Annual International Whistlers Convention in Louisburg, North Carolina. She placed 1st in Popular Female, Classical Female, and Allied Arts Champion Female, making her the International Female Grand Champion. She performed "Kung Fu Fighting" for the Allied Arts competition. She also received the highest score overall, making her the World Whistling Grand Champion, winning over contestants from fourteen countries.

In 2012 at the 39th International Whistlers Convention, she placed second in the International Female Grand Champions and third in Allied Arts Champion Female.
