= Sean Lomax =

- Born: Sean Alan Lomax; 1959 or 1960 (age 66–67)
- Origin: Braddock, Pennsylvania, U.S.
- Occupation: Whistler
- Years active: 1985–present

Sean Alan Lomax (born c. 1960) is an American professional whistler. A Three-time winner at the International Whistlers Convention, Lomax quit his day job in 2005 to tour in Cirque du Soleil's Corteo.

== Life and career ==
Lomax grew up in Braddock, a suburb of Pittsburgh, Pennsylvania. Lomax had a love for music as a kid. He learned how to whistle at around age 6, and started developing the skill after asking his mom as a kid if she could buy him a Hammond organ, which they couldn't afford. He started whistling music from The Sound Of Music at age 8.

At age 18 joined the United States Navy submarine service. While stationed in Hawaii, a friend convinced the performer of a jazz show they were visiting to let Lomax perform his whistling.

Possessing a whistling range of three octaves, Lomax says he was encouraged to attend the annual International Whistlers Convention in Louisburg, North Carolina, and first did in 1985. That year, he performed Beethoven's Fifth Symphony and Gershwin's Rhapsody in Blue but was disqualified for running overtime. He has returned to the competition many times, becoming the International Whistling Grand Champion in 1988 and 1992 and Twenty years later the third time 2012. Named Entertainer of the Year in 2009.

In 1990, while stationed for the Navy in San Diego, California, Lomax traveled to Louisburg and placed second in character as the "whistling sailor" with The Barber of Seville and "The Theme from Superman". After his 1988 win, he appeared on The Tonight Show Starring Johnny Carson; in 1992, he appeared on Late Night with David Letterman and whistled the Fifth Symphony's first movement, the piece Lomax whistled to win the International Whistlers Convention that year.

== Corteo ==
In 2000, he was described as "the strangest part of [a] program" who "wowed the audience with his true and occasionally adventurous renditions of old standards." In 2004, Lomax released the jazz holiday album Whistling This Christmas. Also that year, Lomax made several television appearances and auditioned in Las Vegas for Cirque du Soleil. In April 2005, Corteo launched with Lomax in a leading role, so he left his job as a network technician to whistle full-time. In Corteo, Lomax played circus ringmaster Mr. Loyal, performing upwards of 3,000 shows. In a review for the Houston Chronicle, Molly Glentzer wrote, "ultimately, it's the least likeable character of all—Mr. Loyal, the angry ringmaster—who comes across as the most poignant, when he whistles a farewell to Mauro. Sean Lomax whistles so virtuosically he seems part bird, part angel and part seering (sic) violin." A second incarnation of Corteo, again featuring Lomax, started in 2018.
