= Ron McCroby =

American jazz clarinetist and whistler (1933–2002)

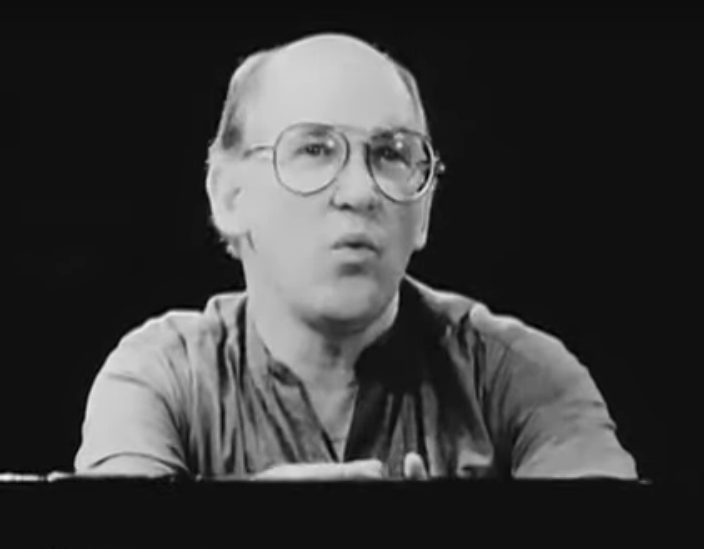
- McCroby whistling at the Blue Wisp Jazz Club in Cincinnati, Ohio
- Born: Ron Abbott McCroby; October 19, 1933; Morgantown, West Virginia, US
- Died: August 5, 2002 (aged 68); Aurora, Ohio, US
- Occupations: clarinetist; whistler

Ron McCroby was an American clarinetist and whistler.

== Early life ==
Ronald Abbott McCroby was born and raised in Morgantown, West Virginia. He is the son of a barber. He was a whistler as a boy, being originally inspired and whistling along to Elmo Tanner while watching a short in the movies.

In High School, he played the clarinet and saxophone in band and would have whistling solos too.

== Career ==
He learned music from a former member of John Philip Sousa's orchestra and played clarinet and saxophone in his high school band, and doing some whistling solos too. He filled in for the piccolo player in the band Stars and Stripes Forever when they were on sick leave.

He studied music and majored in composition at West Virginia University. He dropped out soon after and married. McCroby began a career in advertising at a Cincinnati agency, where he started composing, arranging, and producing for radio and television commercials. He provided the voice of a whistling penguin in an episode of a Scooby-Doo cartoon.

In the late seventies, McCroby was an advertising executive for Little Tikes. He played amateur clarinet, saxophonist, and flautist in jazz groups and directed the local choir. On the advice of his partner, he performed at a music club in Cincinnati. Highly appreciated by the audience, he was quickly invited onto Johnny Carson's television show, The Tonight Show, which gave him significant exposure. From then on, he performed at numerous jazz festivals, such as those in Newport and Monterey, Mexico, and the Pori Music Festival in Finland.

In 1981, he recorded his first album for Concord Jazz, titled "Ron McCroby Plays Puccolo," with a backing quartet including flautist Sam Most, pianist Bill Mays, bassist Bob Magnusson, and drummer Jeff Hamilton. A second Concord album, "The Other Whistler," was released in 1984, followed by a third album made in 1985 named "Ron McCroby With The Arion Consort". In his albums, Ron McCroby whistles jazz and classical music standards on themes ranging from Blue Rondo a la Turk to Vivaldi via Andy Griffith.

== Critical reception ==
Critics describe his performances as "brilliant" and consider the notes of his whistling to be "rich and pure." His improvisations, often on jazz classics such as "If You Could See Me Now" or "Boplicity" are described as "musically impressive" and "virtuosic". His solo on the track "Cherokee" demonstrates his knowledge of bebop. He possesses a sure intonation and perfect technical mastery. The Brazilian musician and co-founder of the bossa nova genre, Antonio Carlos Jobim, bestowed upon him the title " el mejor silbador del mundo " (the best whistler in the world).

Ron McCroby, along with other singers like Michael Barimo, Bobby McFerrin, Jack Cohen and Peter Hassell, was one of the key figures of the late 20th century who elevated whistling to an orchestral or mainstream level. He was one of the first to apply this approach to jazz. It was only after his death that whistling became an organized artistic movement in North America.

== Personal life and death ==
McCroby and his wife, Barbara, had six kids. His children also became musicians, but none of them whistled themselves. In 2002, McCroby died of a heart attack in Aurora, Illinois at age 68.
