= Jason Serinus =

American critic and journalist (born 1945)

- Born: Jason Victor Serinus; 1945 (age 80–81)
- Occupations: Critic, journalist, voice actor, whistler
- Known for: Voice of Woodstock

Jason Victor Serinus (born 1945) is an American critic, journalist, LGBT rights activist, voice actor, and whistler. He is best known for voicing the Peanuts character Woodstock. He is also a member of the Whistlers Hall of Fame in the International Whistlers Convention.

== Early life ==
Jason Victor Serinus was born Jay Guy Nassberg in Manhattan, New York on 1945. He was raised in Rockville Centre, New York on Long Island. He learned how to whistle as a boy. His father also whistled. As a teenager, would walk to school whistling arias.

He attended Amherst College in Amherst, Massachusetts. At Amherst, he founded the New Haven Gay Liberation Front.

== Career ==
As a whistler, Serinus performed on The Tonight Show with David Letterman, Reindeer Games, and many commercials. He did the whistling for Woodstock in She's a Good Skate, Charlie Brown. In 1993, he was selected the entertainer of the year at the National Whistlers Convention, later called the International Whistlers Convention. In 2003, he received the Whistlers Hall of Fame Award at the International Whistlers Convention.

Serinus was a professor at Peninsula College in Port Angeles, Washington.

== Personal life ==
Serinus is gay and married his partner of 34 years, David Bellecci, in San Francisco, California in 2004. He resided in Oakland, California for most of his career, but now lives in Port Townsend, Washington.

Serinus is Jewish.
