= Chris Ullman =

American whistler

Christopher Ullman (born c. 1963) is an American whistler, public relations executive, and author. He won the International Whistlers Convention in 1994, 1996, 1999, and 2000.

== Early life ==
Ullman was born c. 1963 and raised in Massapequa Park, New York. He learned how to whistle as a boy at age five from his father, Joseph, who was also a whistler. As a boy, he would listen and copy his father's Gilbert and Sullivan songs. He started taking whistling seriously at age thirteen, whistling while delivering newspapers on his bike. He attended Binghamton University. In college, he whistled jazz and blues songs for a friend's band.

== Career ==
=== Public relations ===
Ullman was the director of communications for a member of the United States Congress and the United States House Committee on the Budget. He was the director of communications for the Office of Management and Budget and the public affairs director and spokesman for the United States Securities and Exchange Commission. Ullman then worked as the director of public relations, managing director, and the director of global communications for The Carlyle Group in Washington, D.C. He then formed his own public relations firm based in Old Town, Alexandria, Virginia.

=== Whistling ===
In the early 1990s, Ullman's friend, Elizabeth Sauer, introduced him to the International Whistlers Convention, which they called the National Whistlers Convention, where he competed for decades. He first entered the National Whistlers Convention in 1993, winning second prize in the popular music category. He continued entering the competition, becoming a four-time international whistling champion in 1994, 1996, 1999, and 2000. Ullman has performed all over the country with his whistling, most notedly for U.S President George W. Bush, on The Tonight Show with Jay Leno, and multiple covers of the national anthem at stadiums, mainly for the Baltimore Orioles.

In 2012, Ullman presented a TED Talk about whistling. In 2017, he wrote the memoir Find Your Whistle: Simple Gifts Touch Hearts and Change Lives.

== Personal life ==
Ullman lives in Alexandria, Virginia. He has a wife, Kristen, who ironically has sound sensitivity; Ullman whistles in private to not bother her.

He regularly volunteers at the American Red Cross.
