= Corteo =

Cirque du Soleil show

- Logo for Cirque du Soleil's Corteo
- Company: Cirque du Soleil
- Genre: Contemporary circus
- Show type: Touring production
- Date of premiere: 21 April 2005 (Montreal)

Creative team
- Director: Daniele Finzi Pasca
- Director of creation: Line Tremblay
- Set designer: Jean Rabasse
- Composers: Philippe Leduc; Maria Bonzanigo
- Additional composers: Jean-François Côté; Roger Hewett
- Costume designer: Dominique Lemieux
- Makeup designer: Nathalie Gagné
- Sound designer: Jonathan Deans
- Lighting designer: Martin Labrecque
- Dramaturgical analyst: Dolores Heredia
- Acting coaches: Hugo Gargiulo; Antonio Vergamini
- Acrobatic equipment: Danny Zen

Other information
- Preceded by: Kà (2005)
- Succeeded by: Delirium (2006)
- Official website

Corteo /kɔːrˈteɪ.oʊ/ was a Cirque du Soleil touring production that premiered in Montreal, Quebec, Canada on April 21, 2005.

In 2005, Corteo broke Cirque du Solei's record of spectators for the première location in Montreal; more than 200,000 people had viewed the production, compared with 180,000 tickets for Varekai during its première. The show's final performance under the big top took place in Quito, Ecuador, on 13 December 2015. It was later re-staged for arena venues and premiered in its new format on 2 March 2018 in New Orleans. It retroactively closed on November 9, 2025, in Auckland, New Zealand, after the 2026 Iran war precipitated the cancellation of its final tour.

Cortéo—an Italian word meaning "cortège" or procession—was a contemporary circus show about a clown who watches his own funeral taking place in a carnival-like atmosphere. It was partly inspired by The Grand Parade: Portrait of the Artist as Clown on display at the National Gallery of Canada and the movie I Clowns by Federico Fellini.

Directed by Daniele Finzi Pasca, founder of the Swiss clown troupe Teatro Sunil and director of several shows by Cirque Éloize, Cortéo was presented in the round under a large tent. The action took place on a large circular stage consisting of concentric rotating rings. This allowed one area of the stage to rotate while another remained stationary. At times during the performance, the stage was divided by a large curtain illustrated with a painting called the Cortéo Procession. There were entrances/exits at either side of the circular stage.

== Set and technical information ==
During its big top tour, Cirque du Soleil divided the Grand Chapiteau in two by creating a stage that spanned the diameter of the tent, thus allowing the audience to face one another as well as giving a performer's perspective to them. Built into the 104 feet (32 m) long stage were two turntables with a diameter of 41 feet (12 m). Corteo's set had a special overhead transport mechanism, dubbed the "Patience", which had two rails fitted with four platform-like carts each. Each cart had a lifting capacity of 1,000 pounds (450 kg) and a top speed of 4 feet per second (1.2 m/s). At its highest point, it was 41 feet (12 m) above the stage.

The curtains utilized in Corteo were painted in watercolors and were inspired by a painting from 1885 by Adolphe Willette. The Roll Drop curtains were about 58 feet (18 m) in width and 40 feet (12 m) in height. The inner curtains were constructed in Canada and sent to France to be painted. Each of the four inner curtains took nearly two weeks to be individually painted.

The design on the center stage was a labyrinth which exactly matches the proportions and size of the one on the floor of Chartres Cathedral.

== Cast ==
The principal characters of Corteo were clowns, with 62 artists in the full troupe.

- Mauro the Dreamer Clown (named The Dead Clown in the Chapiteau version): The central character of Corteo, and the one being honored in this funeral procession.
- The Clowness
- Giant Clown
- Little Clown
- The Loyal Whistler: His origins come from the classic role of "Mr. Loyal", the ringmaster of a traditional circus. He was played by professional whistler Sean Lomax in the original and re-staged runs. Professional whistler Robert Stemmons held the role from November 2006 to January 2013. Alain Labrie, one of the show's vocalists, also appeared several times as Mr. Loyal. The role has been held by Geert Chatrou since October 2018.
- The White Clown
- Angels: Watch over the Dead Clown and guide him.
- The Little Angel
- The August Clown
- The Villagers: The inhabitants of a small village in Italy, who came to pay homage to Mauro one last time before his great final journey.

== Acts ==
The acts in Corteo included acting and acrobatics.

- Chandeliers: An aerial act involving three large chandeliers and four aerialists representing Mauro's past lovers.
- Bouncing beds: A group of artists mimicked children in this comical act on beds whose mattresses were trampolines.
- Cyr wheel: A group of performers spun and rotated in a large metal ring.
- Suspended pole
- Golf: The giant clown tries to play golf with a rogue golf ball.
- Artist Marionette
- Helium Dance: The clowness floats above the ground with the aid of a large set of gigantic balloons and the dead clown.
- Teeterboard: Three feuding artists send each other flying high in the air in this energetic act.
- Paradis: A unique aerial act involving a trampoline safety net and four aerial cradles. The performers threw one another from these cradles to a group on the next cradle.
- Crystal Glasses and Tibetan Bowls: A large group played the soothing Tibetan bowls, accompanying the Loyal Whistler's whistling.
- Juggling: A quartet of performers tossed clubs and rings to each other with bullseye accuracy.
- Acrobatic Ladder: An acrobat climbs up and down and even performs a handstand on top of a tall, freestanding ladder.
- Teatro Intimo: The characters try to perform Romeo & Juliet.
- Duo Straps: Using sheer strength, a duo performed suspended from long cords, swinging around the stage.
- Tournik: An original act that takes the traditional high bar apparatus, but creates a twist by fusing four high bars to make a cube.

=== Acts in Rotation ===
- Diabolo: An artist manipulates diabolos.
- Aerial silk
- Handbalancing
- Aerial Straps Solo

=== Retired acts ===
- Not so serious: A fiery act that involved two female and a male rhythmic gymnast, they used hoops, ribbons and balls in this act.
- Aerial straps solo: A lone artist swung across the stage clinging to a pair of long cords.
- Tightrope: A solo artist walked a tightwire barefoot or in ballet pointe shoes; the act also involved props such as hula hoops and a unicycle.
- Acro duet: A couple performed stunning acrobatic feats. The man threw the woman in the air; she somersaulted and landed, and they would unite again for the next trick.
- Duo adagio: On a rotating platform, two artists used strength and balance as they contorted themselves into many beautiful poses.
- Foot juggling: Elegance, dexterity and coordination are wrapped up in one character who carries us away to a world tied to the traditions of old-time circus, in which Mauro and his friends once played.
- Vocal aerial silk: A unique rotational act that was performed by Marie-Michelle Faber and was then performed by Aurélie Dauphin; she performed an extravagant tissu act while singing.
- Hula hoops

== Costumes ==
Corteo's costume designer, Dominique Lemieux, utilized "matériaux bruts et des matières nobles" (French for "raw and luxury fabrics") to create a wardrobe that accentuated the artists' natural beauty. The finer details of the outfits were inspired by European styles between 1890 and 1930. The color palette chosen was soft in nature, including blue, pink, and fuchsia along with copper and gold hues. In order to create a worn-in, hand-me-down style of clothing, the costumes were airbrushed and dyed. Common fabrics throughout the wardrobe included silk, linen, and cotton, which were adorned with beaded lace, sequins, and gemstones. In total, more than 900 fabrics were utilized to create the 184 costumes. If back-up and rotational costumes are to be taken into account, the total costume count was around 450 costumes with 284 rotations. During each show day, 12 to 16 hours of ironing was necessary to prepare the costumes.

- The performers in the Paradise act were clothed in silk georgette, crêpe de Chine, and satin.
- The musicians had pleated ruffs along the neckline in addition to engageantes.
- The White clown was dressed to represent classic commedia dell'arte characters. The fabric was gathered at both the hips and shoulders by cartridge pleats, and the bibs were covered in honeycomb stocking.

== Music ==
Corteo’s score was originally composed by Philippe Leduc and Maria Bonzanigo. Additional composers including Jean-François Côté and Michel A. Smith subsequently reworked several pieces. Show director Daniele Finzi Pasca contributed lyrics. Cirque du Soleil Musique released an album of music from Corteo on 23 September 2006 in Canada, and 7 October 2006 in the US. Corteo was one of the first Cirque du Soleil CDs to feature multiple composers.

The album features the contributions of 61 musicians and singers, a 16-piece choir and a 13-piece string section. Corteo’s lyrics are sung in Italian, French, and Spanish.

Listed below are the tracks from the CD, alongside the acts during which they were played.

1. Funerale (Opening pt. 1)
2. Ritornare (Opening pt. 2)
3. Rêve d'un pantin (Marionette)
4. Les chevaux à bottes (Little horses)
5. Nos dejó (Cortege)
6. Klezmer Moment (Helium dance)
7. Prendersi per mano (Aerial straps duo)
8. Anneaux (Cyr wheels)
9. El cielo sabrá
  - Tightwire (2005-2015)
  - Suspended pole (2018-)
10. Fugue (Chandeliers)
11. Volo volando (Chandeliers)
12. Un tierno y dulce (Teeterboard)
13. Balade au bout d'une échelle (Acrobatic Ladder)
14. Garda lassù (Teeterboard)
15. Triangle tango (Rhythmic gymnastics)
16. Che finalone (Tournik, 2005-)

Other Songs

- Bouncing Beds (Trampo-Beds, 2005-)
- Trumpet Bed (Trampo-Beds, 2005-)
- Ascension (Mauro's Flight)
- The Singing Angel (Little horses intro)
- Paradis (Paradise, 2005)
- Prelude to Sette Ricordi (Paradise intro, 2005-)
- Sette Ricordi (Paradise, 2005-)
- Golf
- Foot Juggling
  - Foot juggling (2008-2015)
  - Hula hoops (2018-2024)
- Acro Duet (2006-2015)
  - Aerial Silks (2018-)
- Jonglerie (Juggling, 2005)
- Jongleurs (Juggling, 2005-)
- Planches (Korean Plank)
- Démontage (Transition)
- Costume (Transition)
- Lilipussiens (Adagio duet)
- Appeso al blu (Vocal aerial silk)
- Crystal Bowls (Crystal Glasses and Tibetan Bowls)
- Teatro Intimo
- Prendersi per mano
  - Aerial straps duo (2006-2025)
  - Aerial straps solo
- Diabolo Tango
  - Aerial straps solo (2005)
  - Foot Juggling (2007-2014)
  - Diabolo (2014-)
  - Handbalancing (2015)
- Rilasciato (Handbalancing, 2025)
- Vols Magiques (Flying Angels)
- Tournik (Tournik, 2005)
- Finale (Ending)

=== Vocalists ===
==== Male baritone ====
- Paul Bisson
  - From April 2005 (Montréal) to February 2008 (San Diego)
  - From September 2008 to October 2008 (Ottawa)
  - From July 2009 (Osaka) to December 2010 (Moscow)
- Alain Labrie
  - From February 2008 (San Diego) to September 2008 (Calgary)
  - From November 2008 (Miami) to September 2010 (Tokyo)
  - From May 2012 (Amsterdam) to May 2019 (Hamilton)
- Kit Goguen
  - From October 2010 (Moscow) to June 2011 (Madrid)
  - From July 2011 (Valencia) to May 2012 (Amsterdam)
- Mathieu Lavoie - From June 2011 to July 2011 (Valencia)
- David Repullés - From August 2019 (Sunrise) to November 2025 (Auckland)

==== Female lead ====
- Marie-Michelle Faber
  - From April 2005 (Montréal) to June 2007 (Columbus)
  - From January 2008 (San Diego) to September 2008 (Ottawa)
  - From December 2008 (Miami) to May 2011 (Madrid)
- Estelle Esse
  - From April 2005 (Montréal) to September 2005 (Toronto)
  - From September 2008 (Ottawa) to December 2008 (Miami)
  - From March 2018 (New Orleans) to April 2018 (Knoxville)
- Denise Stefanie - From May 2007 (Columbus) to December 2007 (Costa Mesa)
- Sophie Guay - From March 2011 (Vienna) to April 2013 (São Paulo)
- Émilie Émiroglou - From April 2013 (São Paulo) to December 2015 (Quito)
- Aurélie Dauphin - From March 2018 (New Orleans) to February 2020 (Bordeaux)
- Sofia Montaño - From May 2022 (Split) to November 2025 (Auckland)

==== Female background ====
- Helena Saldanha - From April 2005 (Montréal) to January 2007 (Atlanta)

== Filmography ==
Cirque du Soleil released their film adaptation of Corteo on April 11, 2006. It was filmed in Canada in two shows in September 4, 2005. During the Creative Arts ceremony on September 8, 2007, it won the Emmy award for Outstanding Picture Editing for a Special. The following day, it also won a Gémeaux (Gemini Award) for Meilleur montage - humour, variétés, arts de la scène (best editing - humor, entertainment, performing arts).

== Tour ==
Following Corteo's première in Montreal in 2005, it was seen by more than 5 million spectators. Corteo celebrated its 1000th show in January 2008 in San Diego; its 1500th show in June 2009 in Nagoya, Japan; its 2000th show in September 2010 in Kazan, Russia, and its 3500th show in March 2015 in Bogota, Colombia.

Corteo began (like all touring Cirque du Soleil shows) with a North American tour (2005-2008), which was followed by a Japanese tour in 2009. The show did not go on to any other cities in Asia or Oceania, but instead proceeded to a European tour (2010-2013) and then a South American tour (2013-2015).

The show's Big Top final performance took place in Quito, Ecuador, on 13 December 2015.

The show was adapted to an arena format and premiered in New Orleans, Louisiana, kicking off a two-year tour across North America in March 2018.

== Reception ==
Initial reviews of Corteo in the news media were mixed. In 2005, the Toronto Sun found the show "brilliant" but the Oakland Tribune concluded that it merely "settles for being very good". The New York Times gave a lukewarm review in May 2006, stating at best that it "will pass the time pleasantly for those who have seen and enjoyed previous Cirque extravaganzas". Although The Washington Post named it an "Editors' Pick" in November 2006, the headline of its article noted, "Some of the Thrill Is Gone". LA Weekly in 2007 praised the acrobats but criticized the clowns. A March 2008 review in The Oregonian was similarly reserved, stating that there is a "disparity in the quality of the acts" and a "lack of a cohesive ending". Sun Media was enthusiastic about an Ottawa performance of Corteo in September 2008.

In May 2018, The Daily Nebraskan praised the show, saying it left the audience dazzled.
