= Chihaya Kosugiyama =

Chihaya Kosugiyama (born 1996) is a Japanese whistler.

== Early Life and Career ==
Chihaya Koshugiyama was born and raised in Toyonaka City, Osaka Prefecture, Japan She learned how to whistle at age two from her grandfather, which the process took two days.

In kindergarten, she was called "ill-mannered", which stopped her from whistling for a bit before getting back into it. Besides whistling, she learned the ukulele and guitar in elementary and middle school.

== Career ==
She started performing in 2005 in Daitō, Osaka in the 1st All Japan Whistling Music Competition. In 2007, she competed in the International Whistlers Convention in Louisburg, North Carolina, where she won in the Grand Children's Champion, also in 2008. In late 2007, she was a member for the board of directors of the Japan Whistlers Association along with receiving the Marronnier Prize.

=== Filmography ===
- Utaban (TBS network)
- Let's Go to School! MAX (TBS Network)
- Pokémon Sunday (TV Tokyo Network)
- Future Observation: Connecting TV @ Human - A 5th Grader's World-Class Whistling Dance ( May 20, 2007, NHK)
- Himitsu no Chikarando "You Too Can Become a Human Drum Box!" (NHK, May 24, 2008)
- The World's Most Amazing News (July 30, 2008, Nippon Television Network)
- 100 Japanese People Who Will Change the World! JAPAN☆ALLSTARS ( TV Tokyo, July 16, 2010)
- World's Most Amazing TV Special Investigation Unit (Nippon Television Network, November 1, 2010)
