= Novelbright =

Japanese rock band

- Origin: Osaka, Japan
- Genres: Rock J-pop
- Years active: 2013–present
- Labels: Emperor Mode; Emperor Driver; Universal Music Japan; Universal Music
- Members: Yūdai Takenaka; Kaito Yamada; Sôjirô Oki; Negi; Keigo
- Past members: Kimunii; Takuya; Yutaro
- Website: novelbright.net

Novelbright (Japanese: ノーベルブライト, Hepburn: Nōberuburaito) is a five-member Japanese rock band formed in 2013 and mainly active in Osaka. the band currently consists of vocalist Yūdai Takenaka, guitarists Kaito Yamada and Sôjirô Oki, drummer Negi and bassist Keigo.

Novelbright released their debut EP, Skywalk (2018), and En. (2019), and the band has released studio albums Wonderland (2020), Opening Declaration (2021), Assort (2022), Circus (2024), and Pyramid (2026).

== History ==
=== 2013–2016: Formation and early career ===
In July 2013 it the group was formed with its original members, including Yudai, as a copy band of One Ok Rock.

In July 2016, Kimunii and Takuya withdrew.

=== 2017–2019: Skywalk and EN. ===
In January 2017, Kaito, Sôjirô and Negi. joined the group.

It was independent record label Emperor Mode.

The band's first single under Morning Light, was released on 5 January 2017. The band's second single Count on me, was released on 13 August 2017. The band's third single Like a hawk Flying in the Night Sky, was released on 25 December 2017.

The band's single Walking with you, was released on 30 August 2018. The band's second single To Hikari, was released on 27 September 2018.

In October 2018, The band's first mini album Skywalk, was released on 3 October 2018.

In December 2018, bassist Yutaro withdrew.

In January 2019, bassist Keigo joined replace Yutaro.

The band's single Dear Sir, Dear You was, released on 7 August 2019. The second single Two Shadows, was released on 1 September 2019.

In September 2019, The band's second mini album EN., was released on 3 September 2019.

In October 2019, it was announced that the band had signed to Emperor Driver

=== 2020–2021: First album Wonderland and Opening Declaration ===
The band's single Runner's High, was released on 5 January 2020. The band's single second Kimiiro Note, was released on 21 April 2020. The band's single third Dream Fireworks, was released on 27 May 2020. The band's single fourth Photo Album, was released on 26 July 2020.

The band's first debut album Wonderland, was released on 27 May 2020.

In August 2020, it was announced that the band had signed to major Universal Sigma was announced.

The band's single Sunny Drop, was released on 17 August 2020. The band's single second I just asked for you, was released on 30 November 2020. The band's single third Evening Primrose, was released on 11 December 2020.

The band's single fourth Fairy Tale, was released on 19 February 2021. The band's single fifth Hummingbird, was released on 10 April 2021. The band's single sixth Love Knot, was released on 26 April 2021. The band's single seventh Pandora, was released on 28 April 2021. The band's single eighth Opening Declaration was released on 15 May 2021.

The band's second album Opening Declaration, was released on 24 April 2021.

The band's single The Last Hope, was released on 8 July 2021.

=== 2021–2022: Assort ===
The band's single Life Squall, was released on 23 July 2021. The band's single second Sword of Kindness, was released on 4 September 2021. The band's single third Seeker, was released on 25 October 2021. The band's single fourth 1ROOM, was released on 15 November 2021.

On 10 November 2021, it was announced for Tour Novelbright, will be held from June 23 to 24, 2022.

The band's single fifth Okey Dokey!!, was released on 2 December 2021, in collaboration with Pokémon Unite. The group was briefly renamed "NovelUNITE" specifically for this collaboration.

The single sixth The Warrior, was released on 23 February 2022. The band's single seventh Aitoka Koitoka, was released on 22 April 2022. The band's single eighth Fanfare, was released on 5 May 2022.

The band's third studio album Assort, on 18 May 2022.

The band's single Why, was released on 10 August 2022.

It was announced first Summer Sonic Chiba from 20 August 2022.

The band did the opening theme song "The Warrior" for the anime Salaryman's Club and the opening theme song "Last Scene" and ending theme song "Pride" for the anime Yowamushi Pedal: Limit Break.

=== 2023–2025: Circus ===
In 2023, they released "Unwillingly" (March 15), "Cantabile" (opening theme for Ao no Orchestra), "Odyssey" (October 15), and "Sound of Snow" (December 21). In 2024, singles included "Awesome Life" (March 29) and "Iyn" (October 22), alongside their fourth studio album Circus on April 3, which peaked at No. 4 on Oricon and Billboard Japan.

=== 2025–present: Pyramid ===
In 2025, they released "Winding Road," "Canopus," and "Call me" (August 31), while embarking on the Asia Tour 2025-2026 Winding Road. their fifth studio album Pyramid on April 1.

== Overview ==
- Novelbright became popular on SNS after launching a video on TikTok in September 2019 of them performing "Walking with you" at an acoustic live on the street in front of Sendai Station which rapidly spread on Twitter and gained over 200,000 likes and 48,000 retweets, the song then ranked on streaming sites, it achieved the no.1 position for 8 consecutive weeks on the Spotify Japan viral chart and the no. 2 position on Japan Line Music BGM. Some other songs like "Haikei, shin'ainaru-kun e" from the 2nd mini album "EN.", was also in the top ten in Spotify. The chart had four songs in the top 50 by October.
- The group had a major a debut in 2020. They became one of four recipients of the New Artist Award at the 62nd Japan Record Awards.

== Musical style and songwriting ==
Novelbright musical style has been described as Rock and J-pop

Novelbright influences bands such as All Time Low, Avenged Sevenfold, Bullet for My Valentine, Coldplay, Foo Fighters, Green Day, Metallica, One Ok Rock, 5 Seconds of Summer.

== Band members ==
Current members

- Yudai Takenaka (竹中雄大, Takenaka Yudai) – vocals (2013–present)
- Kaito Yamada (山田海斗, Yamada Kaito) – guitar, backing vocals (2017–present)
- Sôjirô Oki (沖聡次郎, Oki Sôjirô) – guitar, backing vocals (2017–present)
- Negi (ねぎ, Negi) – drums, percussion (2017–present)
- Keigo (圭吾, Keigo) – bass guitar (2019–present)

Former members

- Kimunii (キム兄, Kimunii) – guitar (2013–2016)
- Takuya (たくや, Takuya) – drums, percussion (2013–2016)
- Yutaro (勇太郎, Yutaro) – bass guitar (2013–2018)

== Discography ==
=== Studio albums ===
Title	Details	Peak chart positions		Sales
Title	Details	JPN Oricon	JPN Hot	Sales
Wonderland	Released: May 27, 2020; Label: Emperor Driver; Formats: CD, digital download, streaming	8	8	
Opening Declaration	Released: April 24, 2021; Label: Universal Sigma/Universal Music; Formats: CD, digital download, streaming	6	4	
Assort	Released: May 18, 2022; Label: Universal Sigma/Universal Music; Formats: CD, digital download, streaming	9	9	
Circus	Released: April 3, 2024; Label: Universal Sigma/Universal Music; Formats: CD, digital download, streaming	4	4	JPN: 7,504
Pyramid	Released: April 1, 2026; Label: Universal Sigma/Universal Music; Formats: CD, digital download, streaming	8	28	JPN: 7,923

=== Mini albums ===
Title	Details	Peak chart positions	
Title	Details	JPN Oricon	JPN Hot
Skywalk	Released: October 3, 2018; Label: Emperor Mode; Formats: CD, digital download, streaming	100	35
En.	Released: September 4, 2019; Label: Emperor Mode; Formats: CD, digital download, streaming	78	84

=== Singles ===
List of singles, showing year released, selected chart positions, certifications, and album name
Title	Year	Peak chart positions	Certifications	Album
Title	Year	JPN Hot	Certifications	Album
"Count on Me"	2017	—		Skywalk
"Yozora ni Mau Taka no Youni" (夜空に舞う鷹のように)	2017	—		Wonderland
"Kosumosu" (秋桜)	2017	—		Non-album single
"Runner's High" (ランナーズハイ)	2020	—		Wonderland
"Kimiiro Note" (君色ノート)	2020	—		Wonderland
"Sunny Drop"	2020	83	RIAJ: Gold (st.)	Opening Declaration
"Bad Guy"	2020	—		Non-album single
"I Gave You Love" (あなたを求めただけなのに)	2020	—		Opening Declaration
"Evening Primrose" (ツキミソウ)	2020	23	RIAJ: Gold (dig.); 3× Platinum (st.)	Opening Declaration
"Fairy Tale" (フェアリーテール)	2021	—		Opening Declaration
"Life Squall" (ライフスコール)	2021	—		Assort
"Kindly Sword" (優しさの剣)	2021	—		Assort
"Seeker"	2021	81		Assort
"1Room" (ワンルーム)	2021	—		Assort
"The Warrior"	2022	—		Assort
"Why" (どうして)	2022	—		Circus
"Pride"	2022	—		Circus
"Last Scene" (ラストシーン)	2023	—		Circus
"Iyaiya" (嫌嫌)	2023	—		Circus
"Cantabile"	2023	—		Circus
"Remnants" (面影)	2023	—		Circus
"Odyssey"	2023	—		Circus
"Sound of Snow" (雪の音)	2023	—		Circus
"Ivy" (アイビー)	2024	—		Pyramid
"Winding Road" (ワインディングロード)	2025	—		Pyramid
"Canopus" (カノープス)	2025	—		Pyramid
"Call Me"	2025	—		Pyramid
"Anemone" (アネモネ)	2026	—		Pyramid
"—" denotes releases that did not chart or were not released in that region.

=== Other charted and certified songs ===
List of songs not released as singles, showing year released, selected chart positions, certifications, and album name
Title	Year	Peak chart positions	Certifications	Album
Title	Year	JPN Hot	Certifications	Album
"Walking with You"	2018	33	RIAJ: 3× Platinum (st.)	Skywalk
"Mata Ashita" (また明日)	2018	—	RIAJ: Gold (st.)	Skywalk
"Yumehanabi" (夢花火)	2020	77	RIAJ: Platinum (st.)	Wonderland
"Aitoka Koitoka" (愛とか恋とか)	2022	12	RIAJ: 3× Platinum (st.)	Assort
"—" denotes releases that did not chart or were not released in that region.

== Music videos ==
Song	Year
"Morning Light"	2017
"Count on me"	2017
"Like a hawk Flying in the Night Sky"	2017
"Walking with you"	2018
"To Hikari"	2018
"Dear Sir, Dear You"	2019
"Two Shadows"	2019
"Kimiiro Note"	2020
"Dream Fireworks"	2020
"A Poem that ticks the Clock"	2020
"Photo Album"	2020
"Sunny Drop"	2020
"Bad Guy"	2020
"I just asked for you"	2020
"Evening Primrose"	2020
"Fairy Tale"	2021
"Hummingbird"	2021
"Love Knot"	2021
"Pandora"	2021
"Opening Declaration"	2021
"The Last Hope"	2021
"Life Squall"	2021
"Sword of Kindness"	2021
"Seeker"	2021
"1ROOM"	2021
"The Warrior"	2022
"Aitoka Koitoka"	2022
"Fanfare"	2022
"Why"	2022
"Unwillingly"	2023
"Cantabile"	2023
"Odyssey"	2023

== Awards ==
Year	Ceremony	Award	Result
2019	Tower Recomen Awards 2019	Top 20 Artists of the year	Won
2020	62nd Japan Record Award	New Artist Award	Won
