= Peter Hassell =

Peter Hassell (born 1950) is an American whistler, known for whistling with his hands rather than his lips. He primarily performs classical music and is known as one of the pioneers who established hand whistling in international competitions, including the World's International Whistle-Off in Carson City, Nevada and International Whistlers Convention in Louisburg, North Carolina.

== Early life ==
Peter Hassell was born and raised in Ardsley, New York to father Donald. He was a whistler as a boy, and played the tuba in the school band from the age of nine. His great-aunt, Dorothy, could also do this hand whistle. Hassell accidentally learned while in class. He got quickly familiar with classical music. He graduated from Kalamazoo College in Kalamazoo, Michigan in 1972 as a mathematics major.

== Career ==
As a teenager, his father helped Hassell travel to competitions He competed often at the World's International Whisttle-Off in Nevada, but took a year break when Donald died in 1981. In 1985, he won the grand price at the International Whistlers Convention. In 1990, he won Best Supporting Male Whistler. The winners at the time got to perform on The David Letterman Show.
