= Pucker Up: The Fine Art of Whistling =

Pucker Up: The Fine Art of Whistling is a documentary film on the 31st International Whistlers Convention that follows a Washington D.C. investment banker, a Dutch social worker and a turkey hauler among others as they compete for a prize in competitive whistling.

== Awards and recognition ==
- Florida Film Festival -- Audience Award for Best Feature Documentary
- Florida Film Festival -- Special Jury Award for Excellence in Documentary Filmmaking
- Official Selection: SXSW (world premiere)
- Museum and TV & Radio Documentary Film Festival (non-competitive fest)
- Official Selection: Newport Film Festival
- Seattle International Film Festival
- AFI / Discovery Silver Docs Film Festival
- Melbourne International Film Festival
- Edinburgh International Film Festival
- Woods Hole Film Festival
- Atlanta Film Festival
- Martha's Vineyard Film Festival

== Reception ==
On the review aggregator website Rotten Tomatoes, 80% of 5 critics' reviews are positive, with an average rating of 6.5/10.
