= Robert Stemmons =

American whistler

Robert Stemmons is an American whistler who worked at Corteo for Cirque du Soleil from 2006 to 2013.

== Early life ==
Robert Stemmons was born in Tulsa, Oklahoma to W.F. ”Bill Stemmons and Ethel Stemmons. He grew up in Tulsa, Oklahoma.

He learned how to whistle at age 5. At age 13, he was inspired by whistler Fred Lowery when Lowery came to perform at his junior high school called Woodrow Wilson Junior High School in Tulsa. Around this time, Stemmons had a childhood friend who whistled. They encouraged each other throughout high school. His grandmother, a whistler herself, helped Stemmons explore his interest by playing Lowery songs.

== Career ==
While working as a custodian in Michigan, a music teacher overheard him whistling and asked if he could perform at the school's spring show with her on piano. He performed professionally since the early 2000s.

Stemmons has recorded two CDs titled "Whistlodeon" and "A Whistler's Christmas". From 2006-2013 he performed as 'The Loyal Whistler' in Cirque du Soleil’s “Corteo“.

Some of the different types of whistles Stemmons does is birdcalls and two-tone whistling, where one whistler whistles like it's two people doing a duet.

== Personal life ==
Stemmons met his wife Pauline while they worked together. They currently live in Idaho.
