= Michael Barimo =

American pop singer (born 1985)

- Born: 1985 (age 40–41); Chicago, Illinois, USA

Michael A. Barimo (born 1985) is a pop singer and whistler.

== Early life ==
Barimo was born in Chicago, Illinois and raised in Winter Park, Florida. Barimo started whistling really young, learning at age 3 and copying his pet bird, Sunshine. He would sometimes get in trouble in school for whistling, once in the 3rd grade. Barimo fell in love of opera as a boy, and would sing and whistle the music. He was a part of the Orlando Deanery Boys Choir in nearby Orlando, Florida. Barimo graduated from Lake Highland Prep and attended Columbia College of Columbia University in New York City from 2002 to 2006, graduating with two B.A.'s in Italian Literature and Anthropology. He won the 2002 Sergio Franchi scholarship from National Italian American Foundation (NIAF).

== Career ==
Barimo began his career as a singer and whistler as a child, performing with a boys' choir and touring as Amahl in Gian Carlo Menotti's one-act opera Amahl and the Night Visitors. When he was three years old his aunt gave him a pet canary that supposedly inspired him to whistle. In the first grade, Barimo was awarded "best whistler" of his class, foreshadowing what would come in his musical career. At the age of 11, Barimo appeared on the Nickelodeon show Figure It Out and whistled an aria from Faust.

and performed at galas in D.C. and Connecticut. On March 30, 2003, while a freshman at Columbia, Barimo appeared as the musical guest on the Late Show with David Letterman.

Barimo won several of the national whistling competitions held by the International Whistlers Convention in Louisburg, North Carolina as a teen. Upon winning the grand title of World Champion at the Millennium Championship of Musical Whistling in Edmonton, Alberta in 1999, he began performing around the world, whistling operatic arias, particularly those with fast coloratura. His most well known whistled arias are: The Vengeance Aria (Mozart) The Jewel Song (Gounod) and Mercè Dilette Amiche (Verdi).

Barimo has performed at Weill Recital Hall at Carnegie Hall with the IBLA Foundation and was presented the Vincenzo Bellini award. he was presented with an award by the Licia Albanese Puccini Foundation in 2002, 2003, 2004 and 2006 and performed at their annual gala held at Alice Tully Hall at Lincoln Center. On November 30, 2007, Barimo performed a one-man concert for the Italian Legion of Merit. On November 11, 2008, he performed for Ten O'Clock Classics at their gala at the Russian Tea Room in New York. In March 2008, he performed for the Ten O'Clock Classics at The Cutting Room in New York City.

Barimo has been profiled in The New York Times, America Oggi, The Sydney Morning Herald, National Geographic World, Sports Illustrated, The Winter Park Observerv, BBC News Online, NYC24, The Villages Daily Sun. In summer 2007, Barimo modeled clothing for IO DONNA, the style magazine of Corriere dPeople from Winter Park, Floridaella Sera in an issue profiling 'Italiani d'America".

He can be heard on BBC's animated series for children, 3rd & Bird: "The colourful pre-school animation series, which features the bird-whistling talents of world musical whistling champion Michael Barimo, continues this week with a rollercoaster of an episode."

Now Barimo has a rock band, called Di Bari. Di Bari performs in festivals all over the US and has a following in Latin America. Recently Di Bari has played NYC venues: The Highline Ballroom, Webster Hall, Tammany Hall and The Knitting Room.

Notable performances:

- Nov 2002, 03, 04, 06: Puccini Foundation, Alice Tully Hall
- Nov 2002 NIAF Annual Gala, Washington, D.C.
- September 2003
- March 2003, 04: IBLA at Carnegie Hall
- March 2007: Il Circolo of the Palm Beaches
- March 2007: Pucciana Exhibit Opening for Giulio Bellutti, NYU Casa Italiana
- April 2007: Loew's Portofino Bay Hotel Harbor Nights
- Nov 2007: Italian Legion of Merit Gala
- March 2008: The Cutting Room
- Nov 2008: Ten O'Clock Classics Gala, Russian Tea Room
