= Kimiko Wakiyama =

Kimiko Wakiyama (born June 1972) is a Japanese whistler, composer, pianist, and ukulele player under Victor Entertainment.

== Biography ==
Kimiko Wakiyama was born in June, 1972 in Fukuoka City, Fukuoka Prefecture, Japan. As a child, she started whistling, imitating the chirping of the Budgerigar her family owned. She learned the banjo and ukulele throughout her life.

She Graduated from Fukuoka Prefectural Fukuoka Chuo High School and the Kunitachi College of Music. While attending college, she began seriously pursuing whistling as a performer, playing the piano and whistling at the same time. She consulted with a senior about her career path after graduation; she was asked what he was good at and replied, "Whistling." Incidentally, the "senior" he consulted was Yuichi Watanabe, who composed the music for films such as The Life of Quill the Guide Dog.

Around 2000, she started working with Kazuyuki Sekiguchi, bassist for the rock band Southern All Stars. She worked on 'World Hits!? of Southern All Stars' and 'Whistling and Ukulele' along with fellow whistler Naoto Takenaka.

She started competing at the International Whistlers Convention in Louisburg, North Carolina, winning the overall championship in the adult women's division and being the first Japanese woman to win that category. She served as a judge at the 2024 World Whistlers Convention.
