= Agnes Woodward =

American music educator and professional whistler

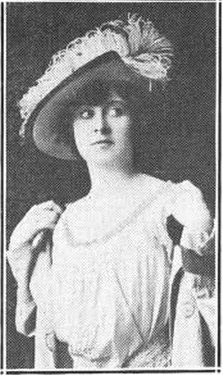
- Born: Anna Agnes Woodward; January 3, 1872; Waterloo, New York, U.S.
- Died: June 18, 1938 (aged 66); Los Angeles, California. U.S.
- Occupation: Music educator

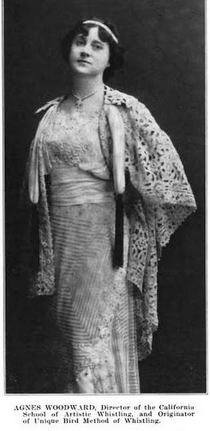
Agnes Woodward, from a 1917 publication.

Agnes Woodward (January 3, 1872 – June 18, 1938) was an American music educator and professional whistler, founder and head of the California School of Artistic Whistling in Los Angeles, California.

== Early life ==
Anna Agnes Woodward was born in Waterloo, New York and raised in Tecumseh, Michigan, the daughter of Charles Meredyth Woodward and Martha (McGlashan) Woodward. Her father was a military surgeon and veteran of the American Civil War. She trained as a singer at the Detroit Conservatory of Music. Actress and screenwriter Bess Meredyth was her first cousin.

== Career ==
Woodward sang with the Whalom Opera Company briefly as a young woman. She moved to California with her widowed mother and studied birdsong to develop her own "Bird Method" of teaching whistling, and opened the California School of Artistic Whistling in 1909, with branches later opening in Glendale, Seattle, Yakima, Chicago, and Portland. Her school's prospectus laid out her belief that "There is an art of whistling which belongs to the higher musical accomplishments, and which, in the majority of cases, falls to the lot of the young woman." Most of her students were young women, including Helen Porter, whose father was the mayor of Los Angeles. But she taught men and women of all ages; she trained actor John Wayne and singers Bing Crosby and Pat Boone as whistlers.

By 1916, she was managing the tours of several of her more successful students, including Margaret Gray McKee, Gertrude Willey, Nina Kellogg, Felice Jung, Mary Louise Hand, and Shirley Irvine. In 1918, Woodward and her "Forty Whistling Girls" entertained at a Red Cross benefit in Los Angeles, adding "Over There" to their program for the occasion. She wrote a textbook on the subject, Whistling as an Art, published in 1923, with later editions in 1925 and 1938.

== Personal life ==
Agnes Woodward died in 1938, aged 66, in Los Angeles, California.
