= Yūdai Takenaka =

Japanese musician and YouTuber

Yudai Takenaka is a Japanese singer-songwriter, whistler, and YouTuber. He is the vocalist of the rock band Novelbright based on Osaka, Japan.

== Early life ==
Yudai Takenaka was born in Himeji City, Japan on November 10, 1995. In his hometown, Takenaka was known as a good singer and whistler as a boy. Singing wise, he was known for singing in a high pitch vocal tone. He learned how to whistle at age three and did it often. In elementary school while watching TV, he saw an international whistling convention in the United States and competed at age 12.

He moved to Osaka, Japan for his correspondence high school. He started composing music after joining a One Ok Rock cover band in high school. He is a big fan of the band, particularly of singer Takahiro Moriuchi.

== Career ==
As a tween and teenager, Takenaka won the International Whistlers Convention in 2009 and 2013 in Louisburg, North Carolina In 2013, he performed his whistling on television before fame. In 2023, Takenaka created his own whistling concert, called "Whistling Sound Vol. 1" in Tokyo. That same year in 2013, Takenaka was one of the founders of Novelbright. Takenaka is the singer and whistler of the group, whistling in songs like "See You Tomorrow".

They made their indie debut in October 2018 with the nationwide distribution mini-album " SKYWALK ".

On August 17, 2020, they made their major debut with the digital album "Opening Declaration" released by Universal Sigma, which features the song "Sunny Drop".

From November 12, 2020, to March 25, 2021, he served as the host of "Novelbright U-Dynamite Nippon" on Nippon Broadcasting System, a radio show for the band.

On January 14, 2021, Takenaka started his YouTube career.

Since July 20, 2025, he has appeared on Nippon Television's "Active Singing King JAPAN" and was in 1st place of the Top 7 representing Japan. His final performance song was " Pretender (Official Hige Dandism song)" by Official Hige Dandism.

On November 10, 2025, He released a solo cover album called DIVA. It was released in January 2026 in South Korea.

== Personal life ==
Moriuchi, Celine Dion, Whitney Houston, and Yuzu are his inspirations. He is the ambassador of his hometown, Himeji since 2021.

== Solo discography ==
=== Digital-only single ===
	Release Date	Title	Published
1st	May 10, 2021	Shinobi's Song	Music download

=== Cover album ===
	Release Date	Title	Published	Standard part number
1st	January 14, 2026	DIVA	CD	UMCK-1812

=== Working with other artists ===
Release Date	Title	Artist	MV	Published	Notes
March 19, 2019	Forward（feat. Yudai Takenaka & KZK）	THE AGUL	-	Music download	
April 27, 2019	Forward Nuoh Remix（feat. Yudai Takenaka & KZK）	THE AGUL	-	Music download	
July 20, 2020	We are not alone（feat. Yudai Takenaka）	THE AGUL	-	Music download	
August 27, 2021	Remember I said（feat. Yudai Takenaka）	THE AGUL		Music download	Songwriter
December 4, 2022	I don't mind dying（feat. Yudai Takenaka）	SG		Music download	Songwriter
September 29, 2023	Lonely	Yoshikatsu Ikeuchi & Yudai Takenaka		Music download	Songwriter
December 11, 2024	Crossover（feat. OZworld & Yudai Takenaka）	Yoshikatsu Ikeuchi	-	Music download	Songwriter
