= Susan Silton =

American artist based in Los Angeles

- Born: 1956 (age 69–70)
- Known for: Public art

Susan Silton (born 1956) is an interdisciplinary artist based in Los Angeles. Her projects incorporate photography, video, installation, performance, sound, and language. Her work is exhibited in museums, galleries, and often is in public spaces, such as her contribution to the exhibition How Many Billboards? Art in Stead and her operatic work, A Sublime Madness in the Soul, which presented through the windows of her studio in downtown Los Angeles and was visible from the Sixth Street Viaduct just prior to its being demolished and reconstructed.

In 1995, she won a James D. Phelan Art Award in Photography.

== Themes ==
Silton's work investigates perception especially as it relates to subjectivity and subject positions. Her projects are often direct responses to current events, the dynamics of power, and celebrity culture. She is especially interested in the perceptions of celebrity, the accessibility of public space, activism, and coded language.

== Personal life ==
Silton was born in Los Angeles, California and raised in the West Los Angeles neighborhood. She worked in Los Angeles and also St. Lewis, Missouri where her dad and his family immigrated to originally from Vienna, Austria. Silton is a lesbian, and much of her art is inspired by her sexuality.

== Select Exhibitions and Performances ==
- 2018 It Passes Like a Thought, Beall Center for Art and Technology, Irvine, CA
- 2017 Quartet for the End of Time (in conjunction with LAND, Los Angeles Nomadic Division), Los Angeles.
- 2017 Ours is a City of Writers, Los Angeles Municipal Art Gallery
- 2015 The Whistling Project, part of 20 Years/20 Shows, SITE Santa Fe, New Mexico
- 2015 Exchange, Proxy Gallery, Los Angeles, CA
