= Vessel flute =

Vessel-shaped flute

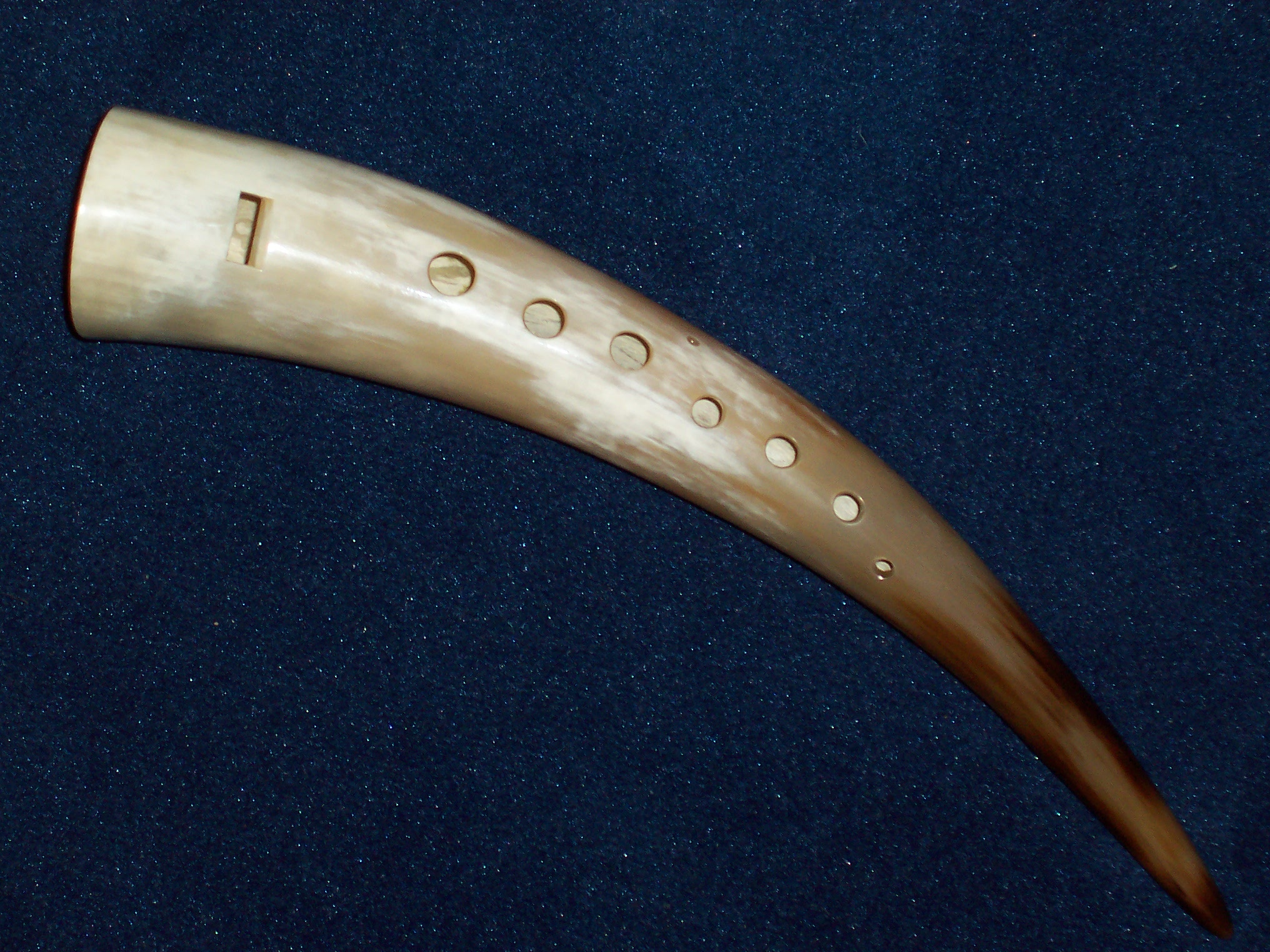
- Sound of a gemshorn A gemshorn playing the beginning of a French mazurka

Vessel flutes

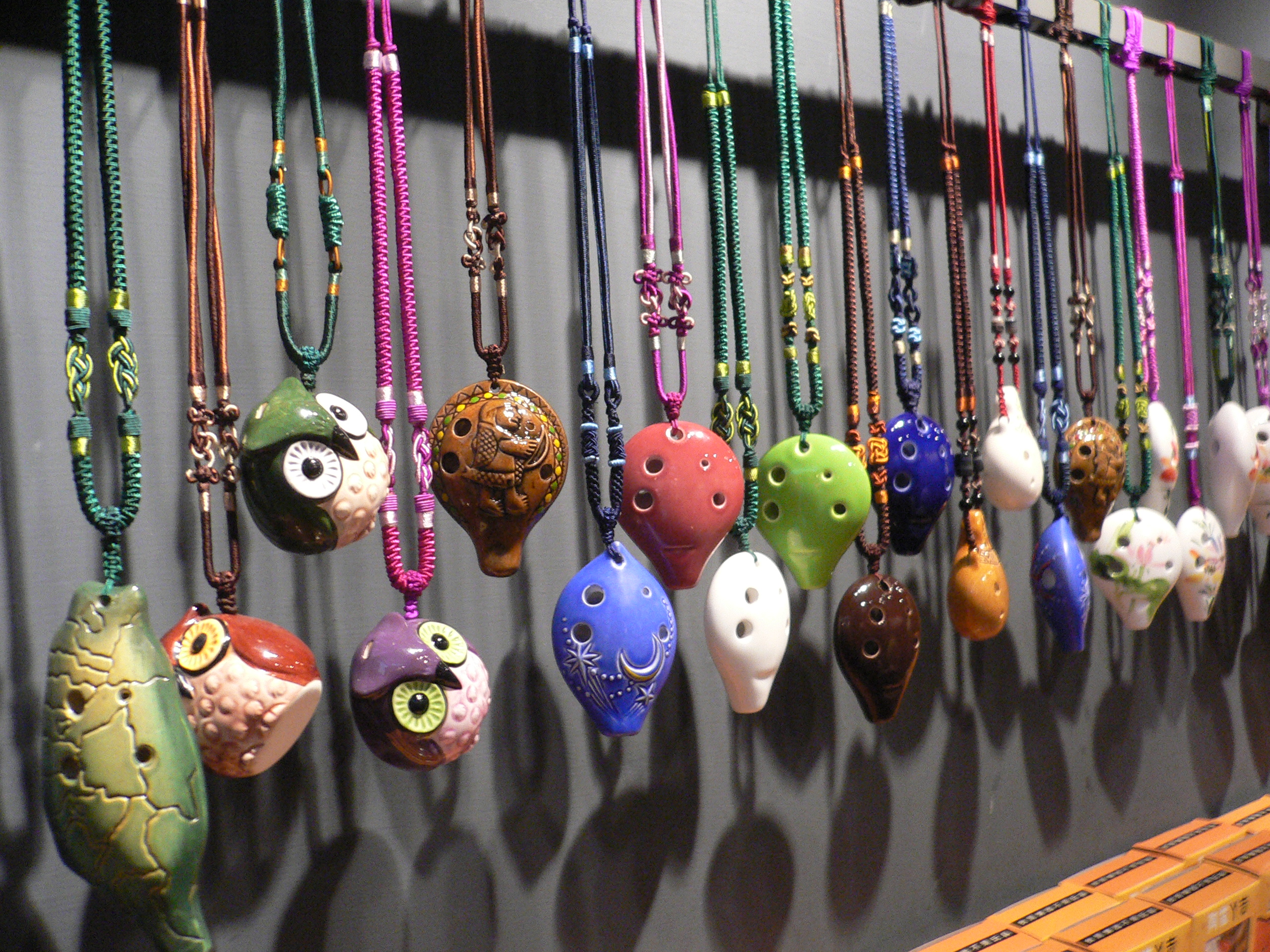
Ocarinas on display at a shop in Taiwan

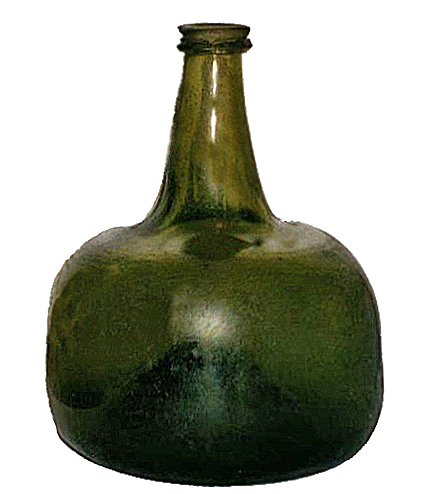
Blowing across the opening of empty bottle produces a basic edge-blown vessel flute.

A vessel flute is a type of flute with a body which acts as a Helmholtz resonator. The body is vessel-shaped, not tube- or cone-shaped; that is, the far end is closed.

Most flutes have cylindrical or conical bore (examples: concert flute, shawm). Vessel flutes have more spherical hollow bodies.

The air in the body of a vessel flute resonates as one, with air moving alternately in and out of the vessel, and the pressure inside the vessel increasing and decreasing. This is unlike the resonance of a tube or cone of air, where air moves back and forth along the tube, with pressure increasing in part of the tube while it decreases in another.

Blowing across the opening of empty bottle produces a basic edge-blown vessel flute. Multi-note vessel flutes include the ocarina.

A Helmholtz resonator is unusually selective in amplifying only one frequency. Most resonators also amplify more overtones. As a result, vessel flutes have a distinctive overtoneless sound.

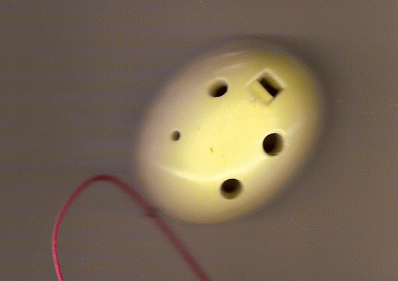
- Sound of an ocarina An E major (in concert pitch) scale, followed by a rendition of Frère Jacques. This is a six-hole English Pendant ocarina (the other two holes are on the back, for easy thumbing). The recording is of a home-made instrument.

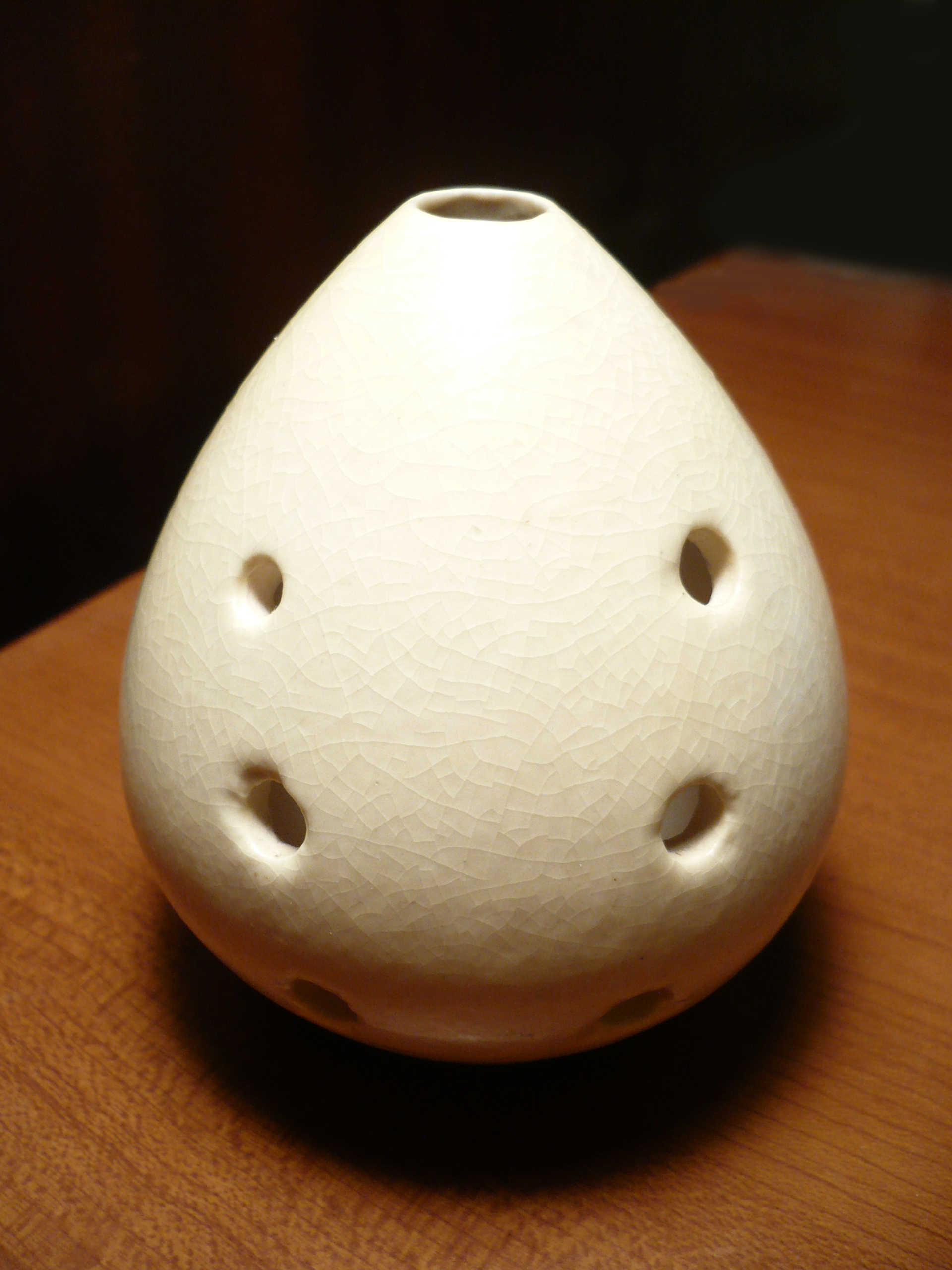
- Sound of a xun A scale played on a xun, an edge-blown vessel flute (note the lack of fipple)

== Types ==
=== Fipple vessel flutes ===
These flutes have a fipple to direct the air at an edge.

- Gemshorn
  - Pifana
- Ocarina
  - Molinukai
  - Tonette
- Niwawu

A referee's whistle is technically a fipple vessel flute, although it only plays one note.

=== Edge-blown vessel flutes ===
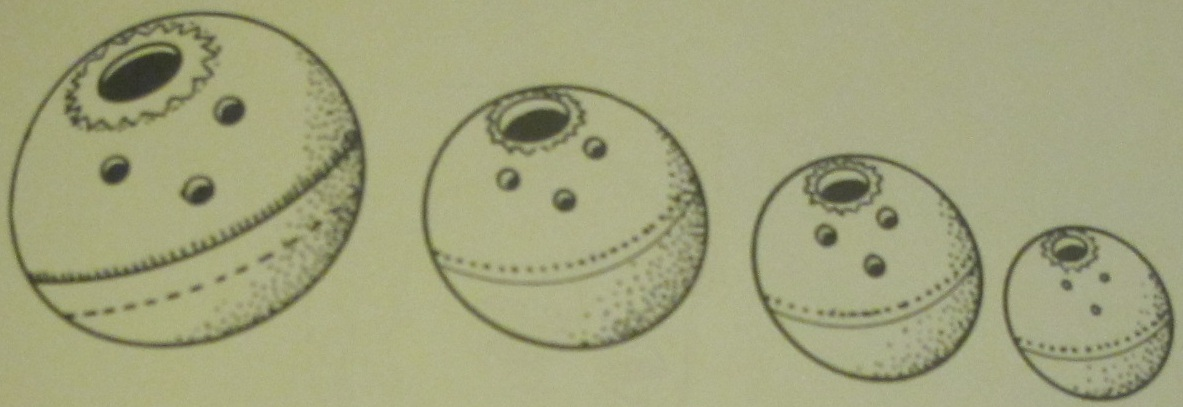
Borrindos, vessel flutes made of clay, often by children.

These flutes are edge-blown. They have no fipple and rely on the player's mouth to direct the air at an edge.

- Xun
  - Hun
- Borrindo
- Hand flute
- Kōauau ponga ihu (a Māori gourd vessel flute played with the nose)
- Ipu ho kio kio (a similar instrument from Hawai'i)
- Blown bottle

=== Other ===
The shepherd's whistle is an unusual vessel flute; the fipple consists of two consecutive holes, and the player's mouth acts as a tunable vessel resonator. A nose whistle also uses the mouth as a resonating cavity, and can therefore vary its pitch.

== Acoustics ==
=== Sound production ===
Air pressure oscillating in the body of a vessel flute with no fipple. These are sounded by blowing across a hole, just like blowing across the opening of an empty bottle. In this case, the labium is the edge of the far side of the hole. Just as in a fipple flute, the airstream alternates quickly between the inner and outer side of the labium; another diagram, with fipple.

Sound is generated by oscillations in an airstream passing an edge, just as in other flutes. The airstream alternates quickly between the inner and outer side of the edge.

The opening at which this occurs is called the voicing.

Some vessel flutes have a fipple to direct the air onto the labium edge, like a recorder. Others rely on the player's lips to direct the air against the edge, like a concert flute. Fippleless flutes are called edge-blown flutes.

The pitch of a vessel flute is affected by how hard the player blows. Breath force can change the pitch by several semitones, though too much or too little air will also harm the tone, so the usable range of tones is much smaller. The optimal breath force depends on which pitch is being sounded (according to the instrument's breath curve). This is why it is hard to learn to play a vessel flute in tune.

Vessel flutes generally have no tuning mechanism, partly because they rely on variations in breath pressure and partly because the volume of the chamber and the size of the voicing need to be matched to produce a good tone. A few have plungers that change the chamber volume.

Fingering holes and fingers that are too close to the labium disrupt the oscillation of the airstream and hurt the tone.

=== Amplification ===
At first the sound is a broad-spectrum "noise" (i.e. "chiff"), but those frequencies that match the resonant frequency of the resonating chamber are selectively amplified. The resonant frequency is the pitch of the note that is heard. Vessel flutes use the air in a vessel for amplification; the vessel acts as a Helmholtz resonator.

Other things being equal, vessel flutes are louder when they use more air, and when they are being played at higher pressures.

=== Pitch and fingering ===
The resonant frequency of a vessel flute is given by this formula: (heavily simplified, see simplifications)

$pitch\ of\ the\ note = (a\ constant) \times \frac{total\ surface\ area\ of\ open\ holes}{total\ volume\ enclosed\ by\ the\ instrument}$

From this, one can see that smaller instruments are higher-pitched. It also means that, in theory, opening a specific hole on an instrument always raises the pitch by the same amount. It doesn't matter how many other holes are open; opening the hole always increases the total area of the open holes by the same amount.

A vessel flute with two fingering holes of the same size can sound three notes (both closed, one open, both open). A vessel flute with two fingering holes of different sizes can sound four notes (both closed, only the smaller hole open, only the bigger hole open, both open). The number of notes increases with the number of holes:

Number of holes	0	1	2	3	4	5	6	7	8	9	10
Number of notes	1	2	4	8	16	32	64	128	256	512	1024
Powers of two	2^{0}	2^{1}	2^{2}	2^{3}	2^{4}	2^{5}	2^{6}	2^{7}	2^{8}	2^{9}	2^{10}

In theory, if the smallest hole were just big enough to raise the pitch by a semitone, and each successive hole was twice as big as the last, then a vessel flute could play a scale of 1024 fully-chromatic notes. Fingering would be equivalent to counting in finger binary.

In practice, the pitch of a vessel flute is also affected by how hard the player blows. If more holes are open, it is necessary to blow harder, which raises the pitch. The high notes tend to go sharp; the low notes, flat. To compensate, fingering charts soon diverge from the plain binary progression.

The same pitch can be made with a variety of vessel shapes, as long as the cavity resonates as a Helmholtz resonator. This is why vessel flutes come in a variety of shapes. The chamber shape does, however, affect the acoustics and ergonomics; it is not entirely arbitrary.

==== Overtones ====
The resonator in the ocarina can create overtones, but because of the common "egg" shape, these overtones are many octaves above the keynote scale. In similar instruments with a narrow cone shape, like the Gemshorn or Tonette, some partial overtones are available. Overblowing to get a range of higher pitched notes is possible on the ocarina, but not widely done, because the resulting notes are not "clean" enough.

==== Multiple resonant chambers ====
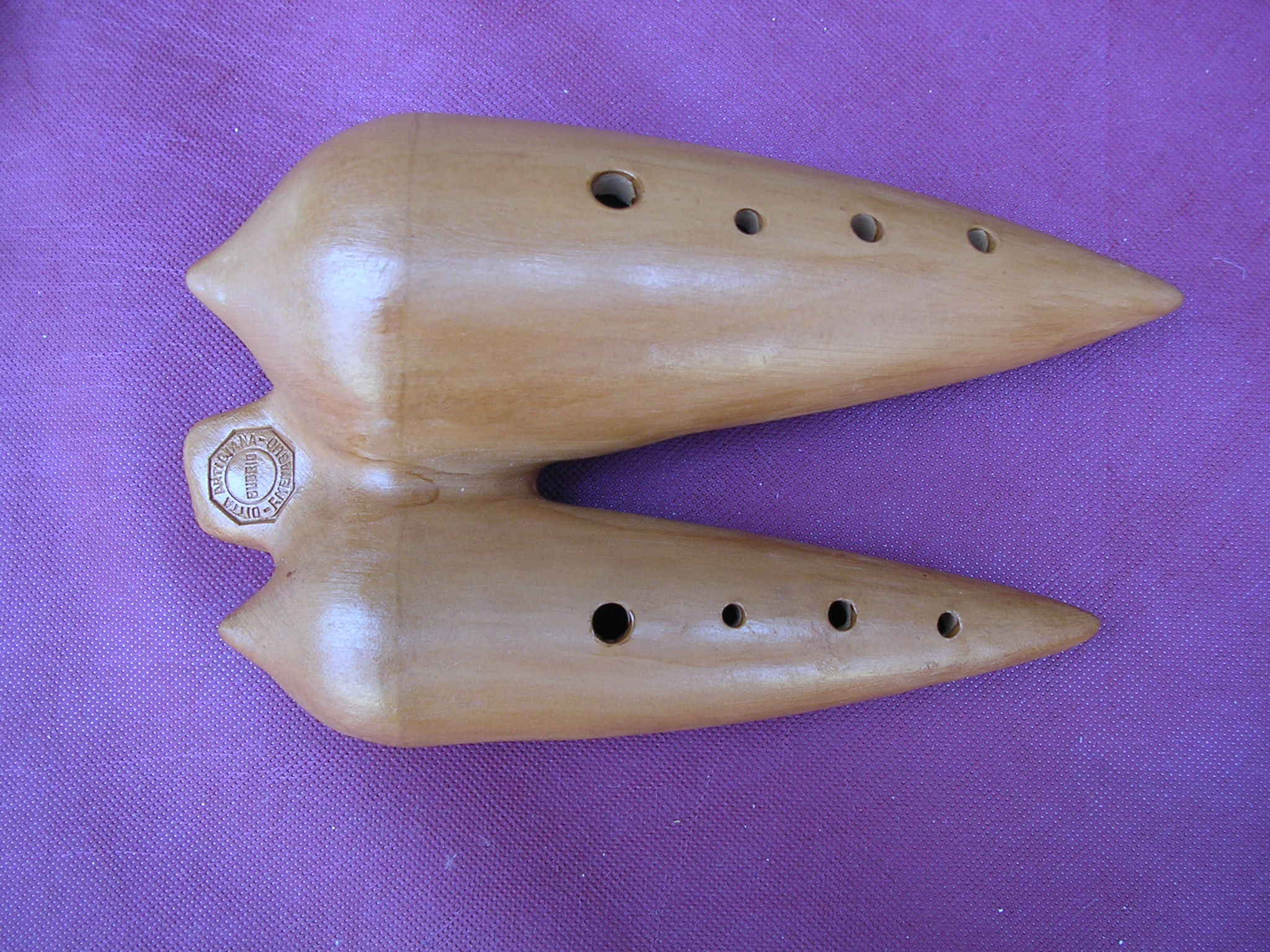
Double-chambered ocarina, for playing chords and extending range.

Some ocarinas are double- or triple-chambered, often with the chambers tuned an octave or a tenth apart. This allows the player to play chords, but it also allows an increased range.

A chamber with a smaller range can be more tuned to better characteristics throughout its range; a chamber with a large range will, for basic physical reasons, have more borderline characteristics at the extremities of its range. Splitting a large range over multiple chambers makes for a smaller range per chamber. So for the same range, multichambers can have a better tone. The optimal air pressure can also be more consistent between notes (a flatter breath curve), making multichambers easier to play, especially for fast music with large jumps in pitch.

==== Physics simplifications ====
A less-simplified formula for the resonant frequency of a Helmholtz resonator is:

$f = \frac{v}{2\pi}\frac{A}{V}$

Where f is the resonant frequency, v is the speed of sound, A is the total area of openings in the vessel, and V is the volume of air enclosed in the vessel.

The pitch of a Helmholtz resonator is also affected by how far the air has to go to get in or out of the resonator; in other words, the thickness of the material the holes are cut in.

===== Variations in the speed of sound =====
The speed of sound, assumed to be constant above, is in fact somewhat variable.

The speed of sound in air varies with temperature, meaning that a vessel flute's pitch will change in hot or cold air. However, varying the playing airspeed can change the pitch by several semitones. Unfortunately, most of this range is not usable, only about third of a semitone / 30 cents (for music with rapid or complex note transitions, the practical limit is only 5-10 cents). This is enough to cancel the expected pitch effects of moderate temperature changes (±20-30 Celsius for simple music, ±4-5 Celsius for complex music). The low notes can be made to sound good and in-tune at a variety of pressures, but the higher pitches are substantially less sensitive to changes in pressure. At low temperatures, the high notes may squeak before the player can blow hard enough to bring them in tune; at high temperatures, the high notes will require so little air that they sound too airy. Ocarina makers can give information on the temperature a specific ocarina was tuned for, the temperature which will give its designed tone.

Air pressure variations do not affect pitch. The ratio of pressure to air density in an ideal gas is constant. Air pressure and density changes therefore cancel, and have no effect on the speed of sound; air is nearly an ideal gas, so there is nearly no effect.

Humidity has a comparatively small effect on the speed of sound. Going from zero to 100% relative humidity should change the frequency by less than a two-degree-Celsius change in room temperature. As the player's breath has ~100% relative humidity, the humidity can't vary that much anyway.

== See also ==
- End-blown flute
- Fipple flute
- Hand flute
- Nose flute
- Overtone flute
- Side-blown flute
