= Whistling =

Whistling without use of an artificial whistle

Whistling
A human whistling.

Whistling, without the use of an artificial whistle, is achieved by creating a small opening with one's lips, usually after applying moisture (licking one's lips or placing water upon them) and then blowing or sucking air through the space. The air is moderated by the lips, curled tongue, teeth or fingers (placed over the mouth or in various areas between pursed lips) to create turbulence, and the curled tongue acts as a resonant chamber to enhance the resulting sound by acting as a type of Helmholtz resonator. By moving the various parts of the lips, fingers, tongue, and epiglottis, one can then manipulate the types of whistles produced.

== Techniques ==
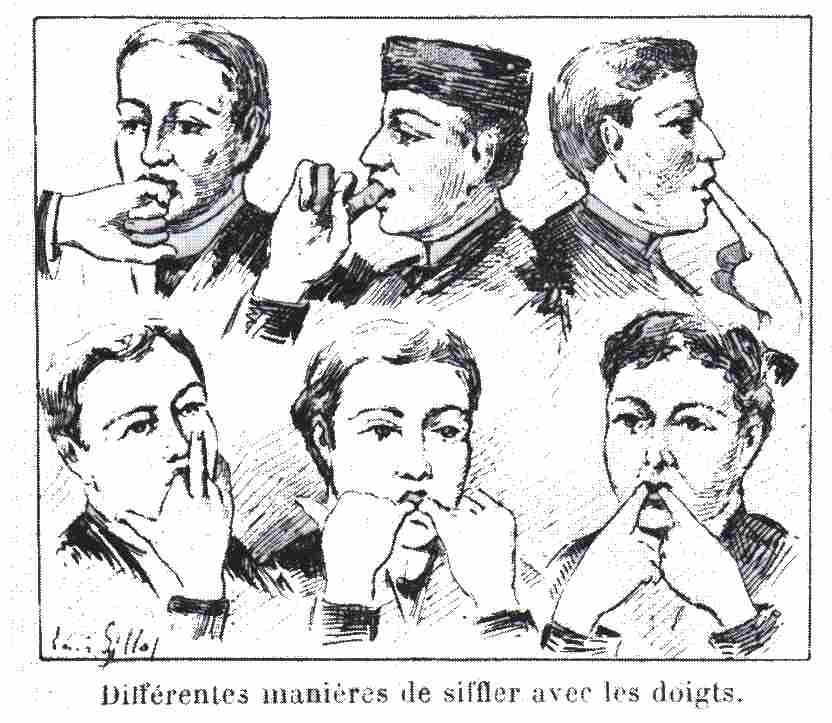
Various finger techniques (Le Monde illustré 14 January 1893)

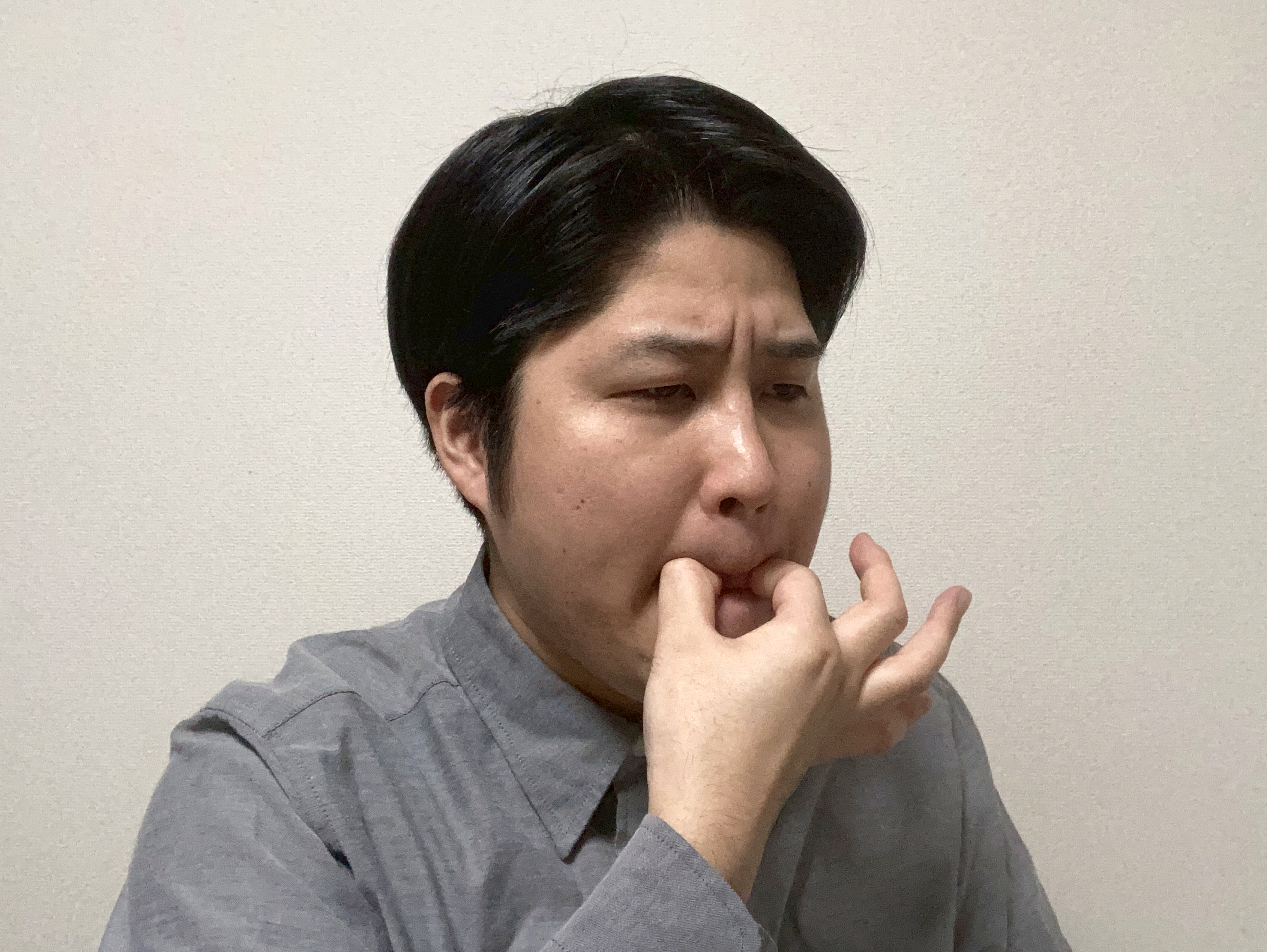
Finger whistling

Pucker whistling is the most common form in much Western music. Typically, the tongue tip is lowered, often placed behind the lower teeth, and the pitch altered by varying the position of the tongue. Although varying the degree of pucker will change the pitch of a pucker whistle, expert pucker whistlers will generally only make small variations to the degree of pucker, due to its tendency to affect purity of tone. Pucker whistling can be done by either only blowing out or blowing in and out alternately. In the 'only blow out' method, a consistent tone is achieved, but a negligible pause has to be taken to breathe in. In the alternating method, there is no problem of breathlessness or interruption as breath is taken when one whistles breathing in, but a disadvantage is that many times, the consistency of tone is not maintained, and it fluctuates.

Many expert musical palatal whistlers will substantially alter the position of the tongue to ensure a good quality tone. Venetian gondoliers are famous for moving the tongue while they whistle in a way that can look like singing. A good example of a palatal whistler is Luke Janssen, winner of the 2009 World Whistling Competition.

Finger whistling is harder to control but achieves a piercing volume. In Boito's opera Mefistofele the title character uses it to express his defiance of the Almighty.

Whistling can also be produced by blowing air through enclosed, cupped hands or through an external instrument, such as a whistle.

== Competitions ==
One of the most well-known whistling competitions is the International Whistlers Convention (IWC). This annual event took place in Louisburg, North Carolina, from 1973 to 2013. It recognized adult males and females, teenage males and females, and child champions.

One of the most prolific whistling competitors is a Virginia-based communications expert, Christopher W. Ullman, who has won the IWC so many times he is listed in the International Whistling Hall of Fame. Ullman won the IWC Grand Championship three times, in 1996, 1999, and 2000. In 1999, he was given the Lillian Williams Achievement Award as Whistling Entertainer of the Year.

According to Guinness World Records, the highest pitch human whistle ever recorded was measured at 10,599 Hz, which corresponds to an E9 musical note. This was done by Joshua Lockard in Southlake, Texas, on May 1, 2019. The lowest pitch whistle ever recorded was measured at 174.6 Hz, which corresponds to an F3 musical note. This was accomplished by Jennifer Davies (Canada) at the Impossibility Challenger Games in Dachau, Germany, on 6 November 2006. The most people whistling simultaneously was 853, which was organized at the Spring Harvest event at Minehead, UK, on April 11, 2014.

== As communication ==
On La Gomera, one of Spain's Canary Islands, a traditional whistled language, Silbo Gomero, is still used. At least nine separate whistling sounds are used to produce usually four vowels and five consonants. The language allowed people (such as shepherds) to communicate over long distances on the island, when other communication means were not available. It is now taught in school so that it is not lost among the younger generation. Another group of whistlers were the Mazateco Indians of Oaxaca, Mexico. Their whistling aided in conveying messages over far distances but was used also in close quarters as a unique form of communication with a variety of tones.

Whistling can be used to control trained animals such as dogs. A shepherd's whistle is often used instead.

Whistling has long been used as a specialized communication between laborers. For example, whistling in theatre, particularly on-stage, is used by flymen (members of a fly crew) to cue the lowering or raising of a batten pipe or flat. This method of communication became popular before the invention of electronic means of communication, and is still in use, primarily in older "hemp" houses during the set and strike of a show.

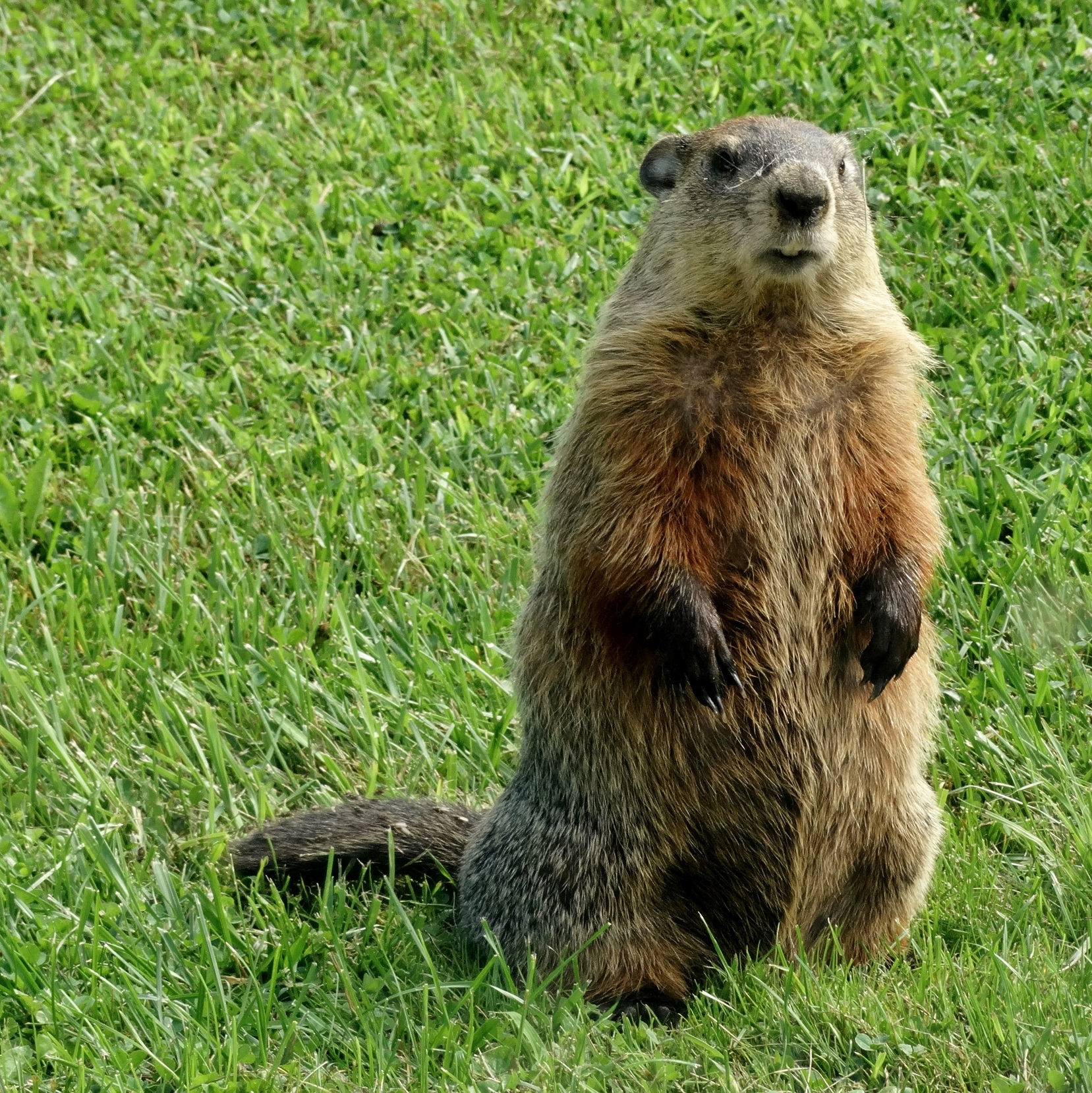
The groundhog makes a whistling sound as an alarm call.

Burrowing animals species are known to whistle to communicate threats, such as marmot species including the groundhog (woodchuck) and the alpine marmot. Whistling to communicate threats is used by animals such as prairie dogs, which have one of the most complex communication systems in the animal kingdom. Prairie dogs can communicate an animal's speed, shape, size, and species and for humans specific attire and if the human is carrying a gun. This method of communication is usually done by having a sentry stand on two feet surveying for potential threats while the rest of the pack finds food. Once a threat has been identified the sentry sounds a whistle alarm, (sometimes describing the threat) at which point the pack retreats to their burrows. The intensity of the threat is usually determined by how long and how loud the sentry whistles. The sentry continues to whistle the alarm until the entirety of the pack has gone to safety at which point the sentry returns to the burrow.

== In music ==
The range of pucker whistlers varies from about one to three octaves. Agnes Woodward classifies by analogy to voice types: soprano (c"-c""), mezzo (a-g'") and alto (e or d-g").

Many performers on the music hall and Vaudeville circuits were professional whistlers (also known as siffleurs), the most famous of whom were Ronnie Ronalde, Fred Lowery, and Ilse Werner. The term puccalo or puccolo was coined by Ron McCroby to refer to highly skilled jazz whistling.

Whistling is featured in several television themes, such as Lassie, The Andy Griffith Show and Mark Snow's title theme for The X-Files. It also prominently features in the score of the movie Twisted Nerve, composed by Bernard Herrmann, which was later used in Quentin Tarantino's Kill Bill.

Roger Whittaker released albums with whistling tracks such as "Mexican Whistler" and "Finnish Whistler".

== By spectators ==
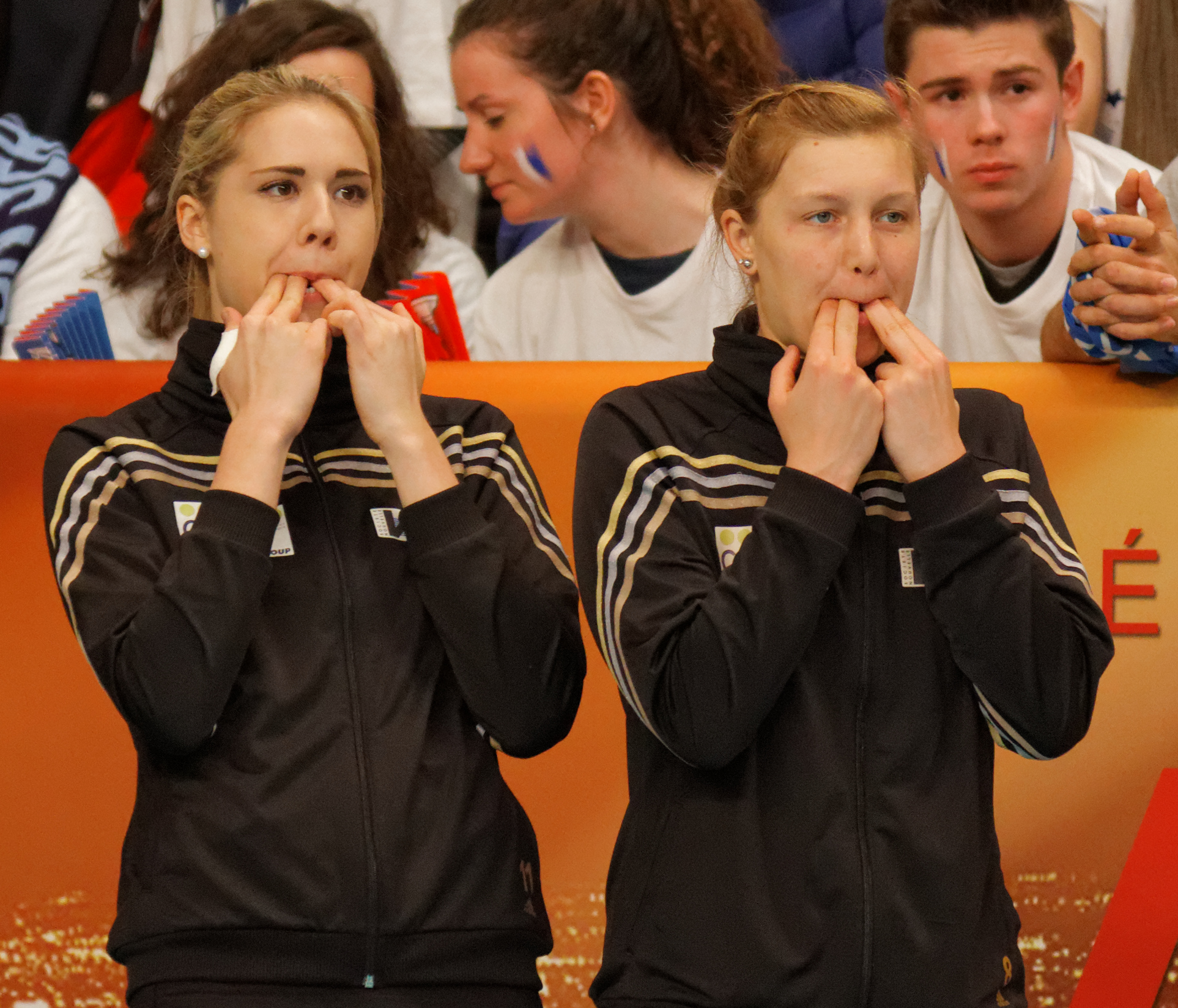
Spectators whistling during the Volleyball French Cup

Whistling is often used by spectators at sporting events to express either enthusiasm or disapprobation. In the United States and Canada, whistling is used much like applause, to express approval or appreciation for the efforts of a team or a player, such as a starting pitcher in baseball who is taken out of the game after having pitched well. In much of the rest of the world, especially Europe and South America, whistling is used to express displeasure with the action or disagreement with an official's decision, like booing. This whistling is often loud and cacophonous, using finger whistling. Whistling is used by spectators attending concerts to show approval of the singer’s talent.

== During roll calls in Ravensbrück ==
Some female prisoners of concentration camp Ravensbrück, such as the Dutch Martha Froukje Mees, lifted their fellow prisoners during the long daily roll calls by whistling songs and melodies.

== Cultural beliefs ==
In many cultures, whistling or making whistling noises in the morning is thought to attract good luck, good things, or good spirits.

In the UK there has historically been a superstitious belief in the "Seven Whistlers" which are seven mysterious birds or spirits who call out to foretell death or a great calamity. In the 19th century, large groups of coal miners were known to have refused to enter the mines for one day after hearing this spectral whistling. The Seven Whistlers have been mentioned in literature such as The Faerie Queene by Edmund Spenser, as bearing an omen of death. William Wordsworth included fear of the Seven Whistlers in his poem, "Though Narrow Be That Old Man's Cares". The superstition has been reported in the Midlands of England but also in Lancashire, Essex, Kent, and even in other places such as North Wales and Portugal. The Iron Maiden song "The Prophecy" from their album Seventh Son of a Seventh Son also references the "Seven Whistlers" as a warning of doom.

In Russian and other Slavic cultures, and also in Romania and Lithuania, whistling indoors is superstitiously believed to bring poverty ("whistling money away"), whereas whistling outdoors is considered normal. In Estonia and Latvia, it is widely believed that whistling indoors may bring bad luck and therefore set the house on fire.

Whistling on board a sailing ship is thought to encourage the wind strength to increase. This is regularly alluded to in the Aubrey–Maturin books by Patrick O'Brian.

Theater practice has plenty of superstitions: one of them is against whistling. A popular explanation is that traditionally sailors, skilled in rigging and accustomed to the boatswain's pipe, were often used as stage technicians, working with the complicated rope systems associated with flying. An errant whistle might cause a cue to come early or a "sailor's ghost" to drop a set piece on top of an actor. An offstage whistle audible to the audience in the middle of a performance might also be considered bad luck.

Transcendental whistling (chángxiào 長嘯) was an ancient Chinese Daoist technique of resounding breath yoga, and skillful whistlers supposedly could summon supernatural beings, wild animals, and weather phenomena.

In Thailand, it is believed that whistling is inauspicious at night, especially when indoors, because it is an invitation for a ghost or a snake to enter the house. In India, it is also believed that whistling in the home will cause the members of the household to experience various disasters. Countries in East Asia such as China, Japan, and Korea also believe in similar superstitions. In Islamic countries such as Indonesia, whistling at night is believed to summon the jinn.

== See also ==
- Alice J. Shaw, professional whistler
- Bird vocalization § Bird song and music
- Boatswain's call
- Hand flute
- Irish whistling champions
- Piedmont High School (California) § Bird Calling Contest
- Puirt à beul
- Rosita Serrano, whistling performer nicknamed Chilenische Nachtigall (Chilean Nightingale)
- Silbo Gomero language
- Slide whistle
- Tin whistle
- Wolf-whistling
- Whistle Pops
- Whistle register
- Whistled language
- Leaf whistle
