= Hand flute =

Hand-based musical instrument

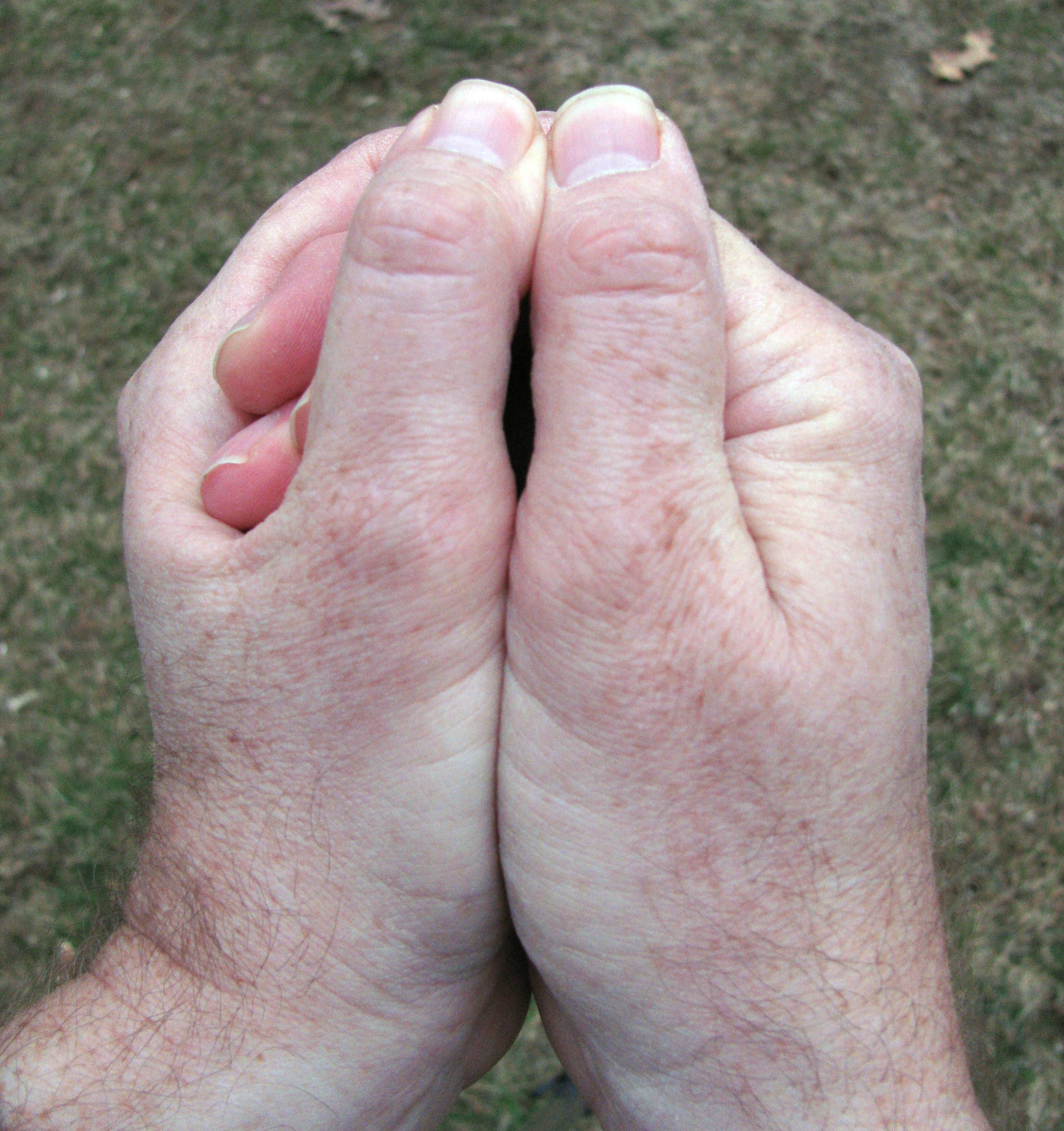
The air is blown between the thumbs into the hand.

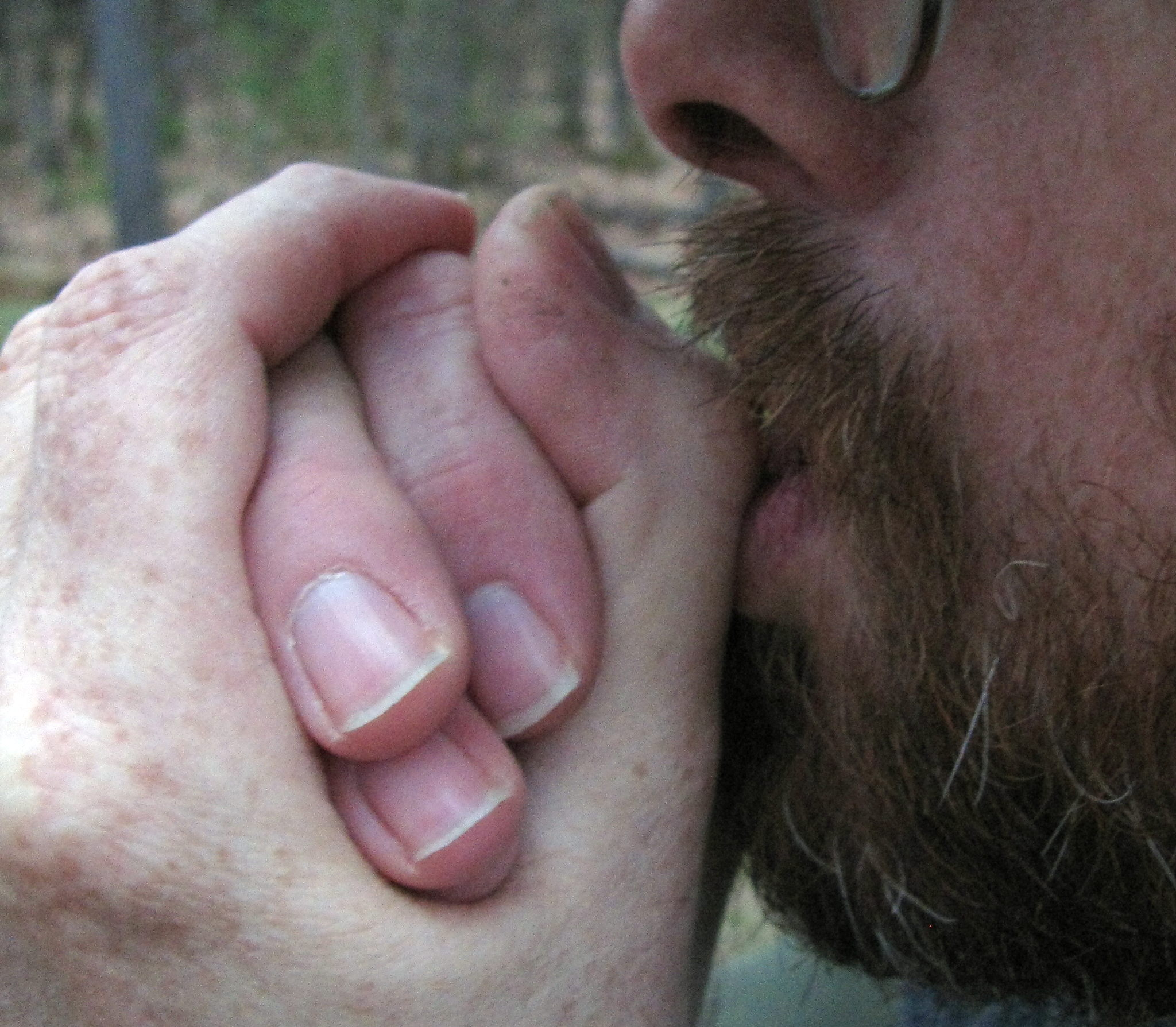
The thumb knuckles are put on the lips.

The hand flute, or handflute, is a musical instrument made out of the player's hands. It is also called a hand ocarina or hand whistle. To produce sound, the player creates a chamber of air with their hands, into which they blow air via an opening at the thumbs. There are two common techniques involving the shape of the hand chamber: the "cupped hand" technique and the "interlock" technique.

The pitch depends on how the hands are held. If the space between the hands is made smaller or the opening made larger, the pitch becomes higher: the principles are the same with an ocarina or Helmholtz resonator; see vessel flute for details of the acoustics. The best hand flute players have a range of up to 2.5 octaves.

An early recording of hand-whistling originates from a 1954 short communication. Bearing similarity to "a lover’s flute tradition", it was described how Kickapoo from Mexico "cupp[ed] the[ir] hands, [a]ir was blown into the cavity between the knuckles of the thumbs [that were] placed against the lips vertically".

== See also ==
- Flute
- Wolf-whistling
- Whistle register
- Whistled language
- Whistling
- Ocarina
