= Gemshorn =

Type of musical instrument

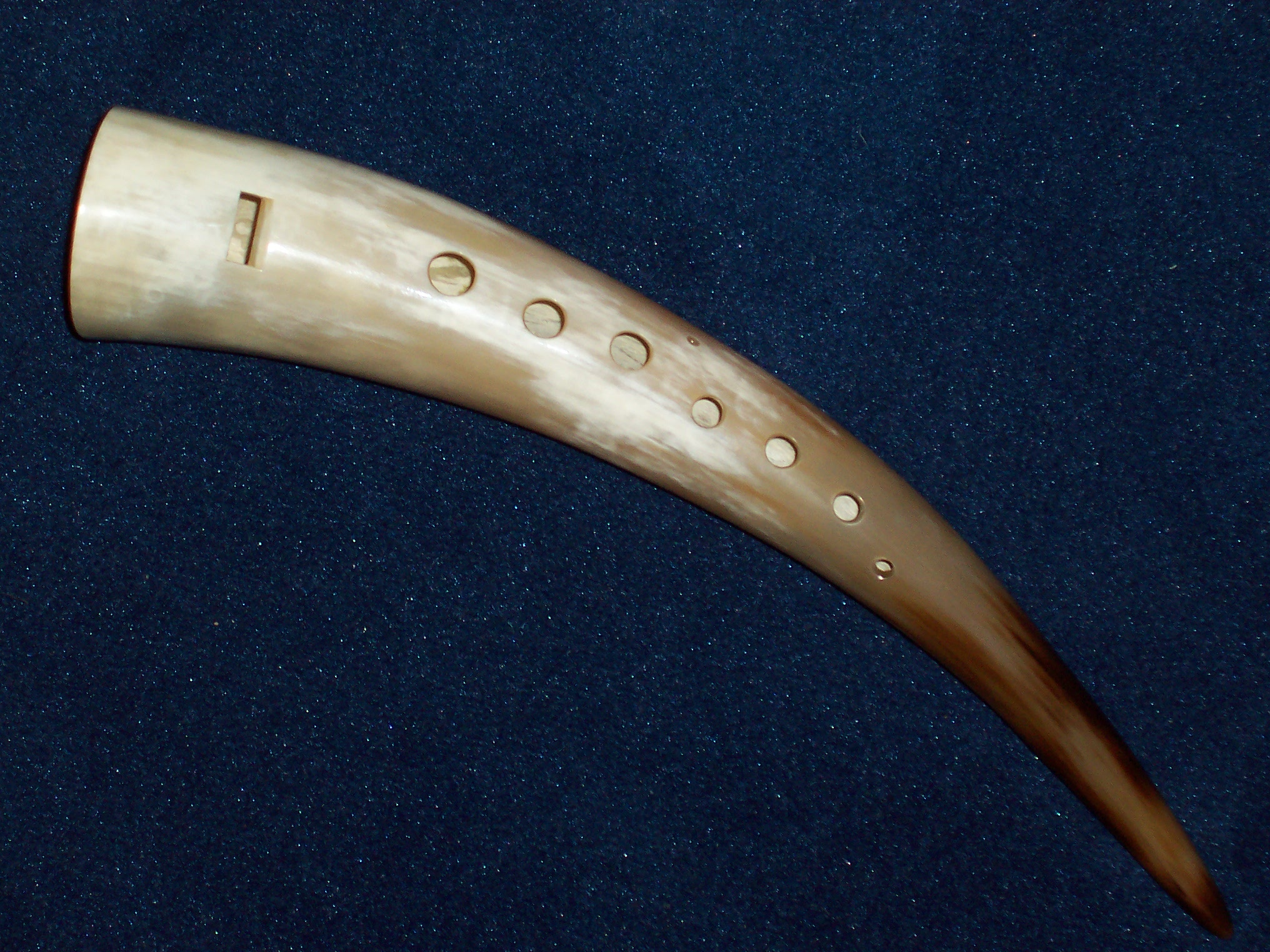
- Classification: Wind; Woodwind

Playing range
- 1 octave

Related instruments
- Ocarina; Blowing horn; Cornett; Recorder

The gemshorn is an instrument of the ocarina family that was historically made from the horn of a chamois, goat, or other suitable animal. The gemshorn receives its name from the German language, in which Gemshorn means a "chamois horn".

== History ==
The gemshorn was used in the 15th century. Examples have been unearthed in Italy, in Hungary and in Germany, including one intact instrument made of clay which dates at least to 1450, as it was found buried beneath the foundation of a house built at that time. The early history of the instrument is not well-known, but the oldest known illustration of one in a reference work is in Musica Getutscht (1511), by Sebastian Virdung. A skeletal figure is seen holding one in a Danse Macabre illustration dated to 1485. There is also mention of this instrument in "The Complaynt of Scotlande" as "ane gatehorn"(goat horn). They were primarily a pastoral instrument and were not widely known after the mid-to-late 16th century. With resurgent interest in early music in the 19th and 20th centuries, they have received new attention. Horace Fitzpatrick developed a form of gemshorn which adopted the fingering method of recorders and produced them in consort families, which have proven very popular since the 1960s.

== Construction ==
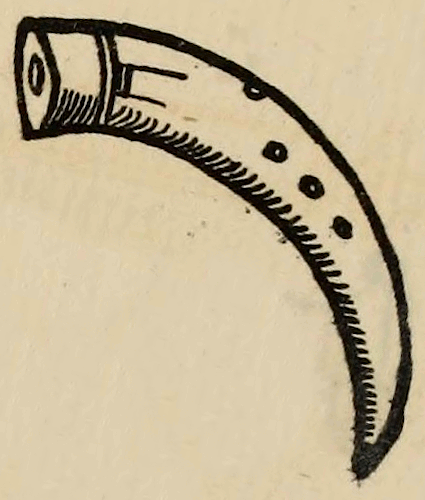
Gemshorn as depicted in Musica Getutscht

Modern gemshorns are often made of the horns of domesticated cattle, because they are readily available, and their use prevents endangering wild species. The hollow horn has tone holes down the front, like a recorder or clarinet. The pointed end of the horn is left intact, and serves as the bottom of the instrument. A fipple plug, usually of wood, is fitted into the wide end of the instrument, with a recorder type voicing window on the front of the horn, for tone production.

On more advanced models, there is a "tuning ring". This is a metal band or ring, placed between the voicing window and the top tone hole. A hole is drilled through this ring and the horn beneath. When the ring is turned with the fingers the hole is partially blocked. This lowers the flute's keynote by up to about one major tone. Partial wax closure of the dorsal (rear) thumb hole will accomplish the same keynote tuning.

Some recent makers have used synthetic materials in place of the animal horn. Another alternative, offered by some makers, is wooden gemshorns.

== Playing and sound ==
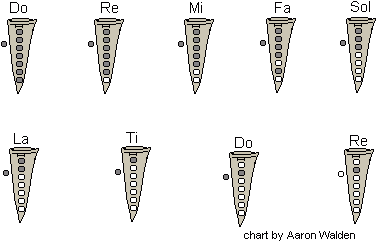
fingering chart

16th-century illustrations show an instrument which had only a few tone holes, and a very limited range. The intact clay gemshorn, mentioned above, which was found beneath a 15th-century house, had a chromatic range of one octave. Modern makers have often chosen to build them using the Baroque recorder fingering.

The sound of the gemshorn is like that of other flutes, but with an ocarina-like lack of harmonic overtones.

Alto gemshorn in F

== Organ stop ==
There is a gemshorn organ stop, modeled after this instrument. Its pipes are conical, with the wind going in at the wide end, as in the actual gemshorn. In organ pipe classification it is a flute/string hybrid.

== See also ==
- Early music
- Helmholtz resonance
- Ocarina
- Pan flute
- Pifana, a Corsican gemshorn
- Tonette
