= Tonette =

Small, end-blown flute made of plastic

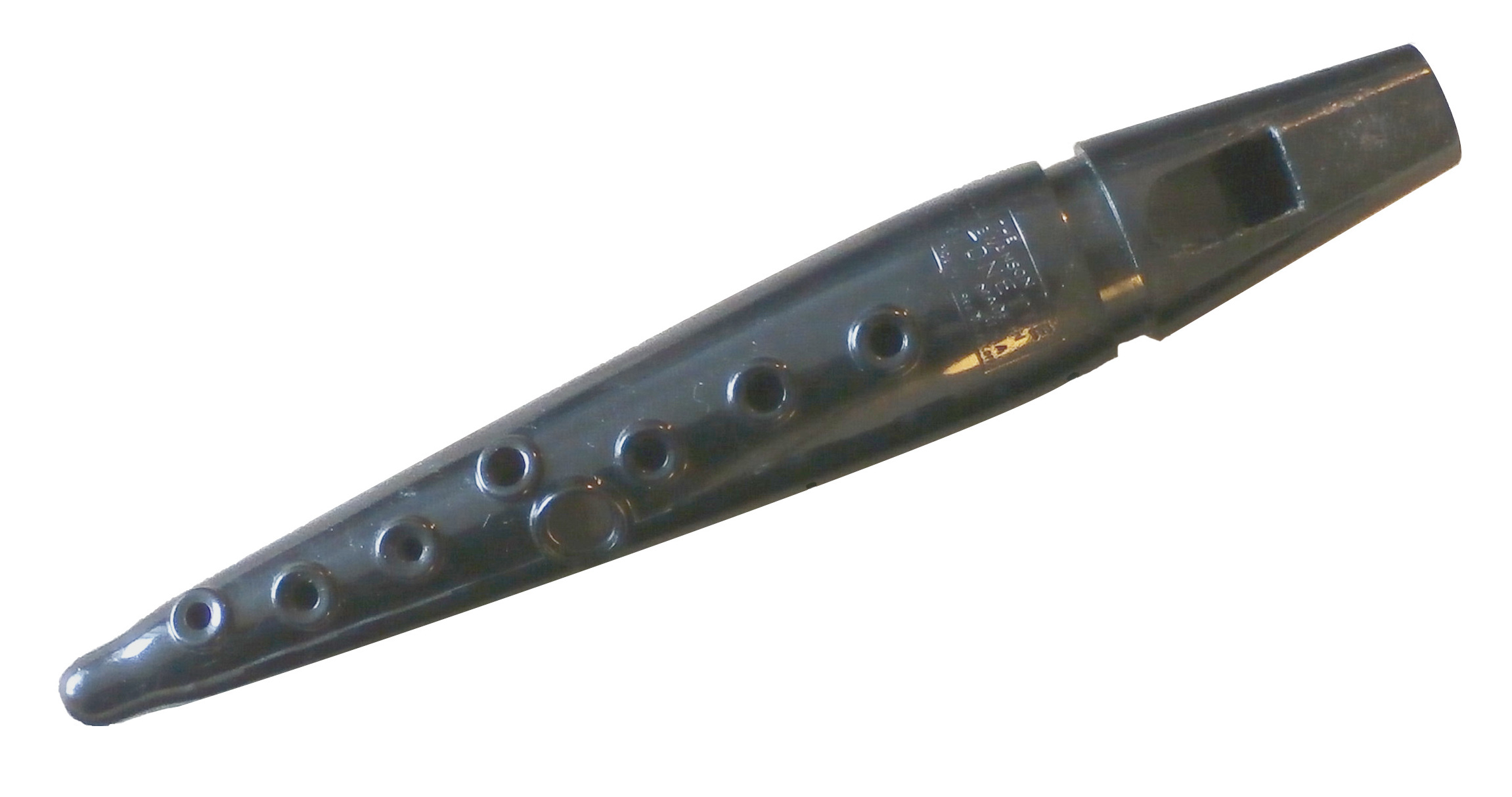
The Swanson tonette

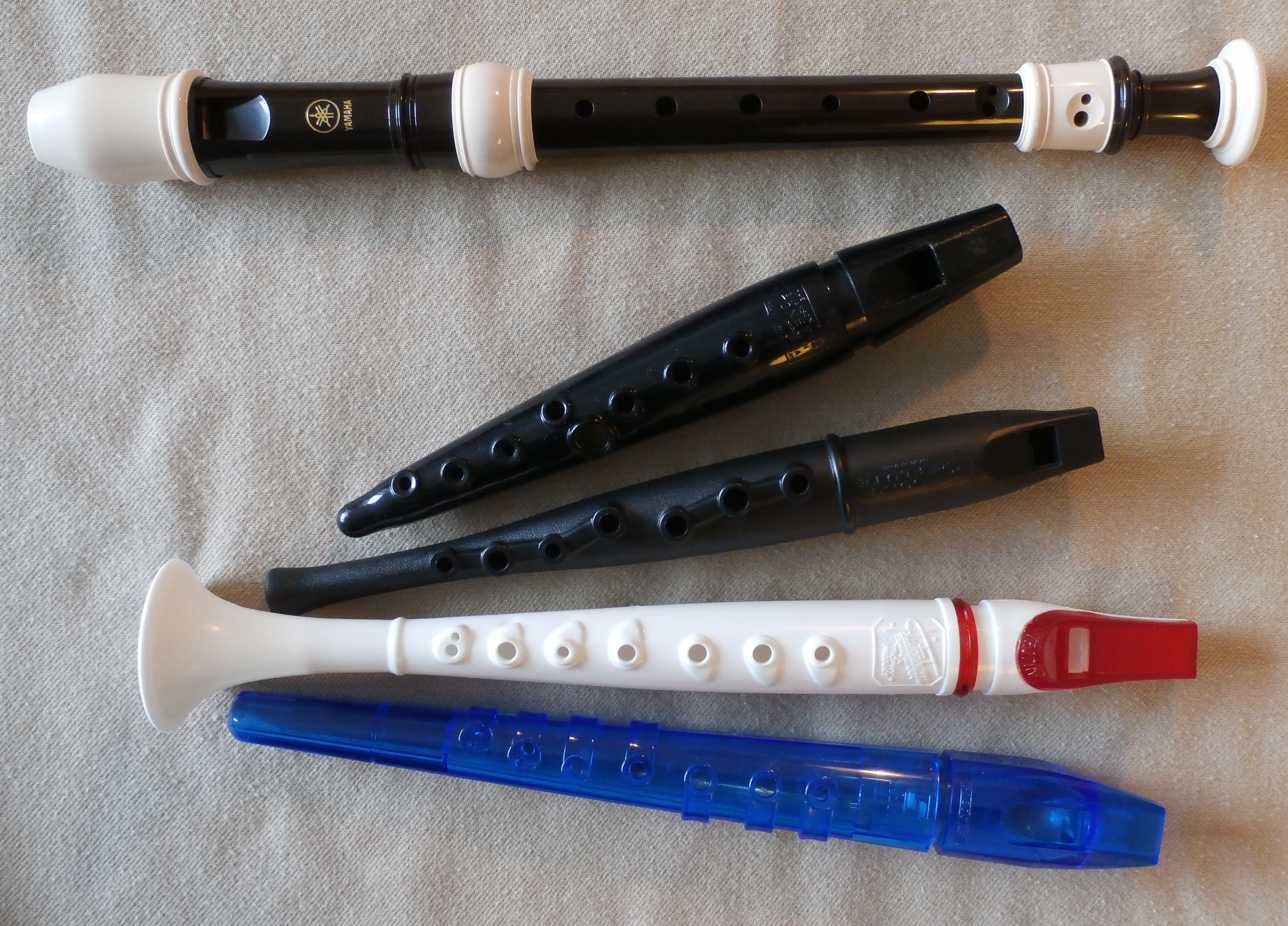
From top to bottom: Yamaha soprano recorder, Swanson tonette, Conn-Selmer song flute, Grover-Trophy flutophone, Suzuki precorder

The stub-ended Swanson tonette is a small (6" cavity), end-blown vessel flute made of plastic, which was once popular in American elementary music education. Though the tonette has been superseded by the recorder in many areas, plastic Tonettes are still in use in elementary schools around the nation due to their price, durability, and simplicity. The range of the tonette is from C4 to D5. A skilled player can produce notes above the principal register by overblowing and half-covering holes. Similar instruments are the song flute, flutophone, and precorder.

The Swanson tonette was introduced in 1938. Designed as a pre-band instrument, the tonette was nearly unbreakable, chromatic, and tunable. It was easy to blow, and the fingering was simple. By 1941 over half of the grammar schools in the United States had adopted the tonette as standard pre-band equipment. The tonette's pleasant flute-like sound was also used for special novelty effects in radio, television, and film.

As a closed pipe (with all tone holes closed), the Swanson tonette's pitch (in Hz) is approximately half that of a recorder (an open pipe) of comparable length. Although the cavity appears to be conical, the overblown (1st overtone) of the low C4 is G5, an octave and a fifth above, indicating a cylindrical pipe such as the clarinet. (The 2nd overtone is C6. A conical pipe, such as the saxophone, has as its first overtone the octave.)

However, the pitch analysis is more complex above the fundamental, as the tonette is actually a Helmholtz resonator (like the ocarina) rather than an open or closed pipe. The pitch depends upon the ratio of the total area of open tone holes to the volume of the resonating cavity. Tonette tone holes are of varying sizes designed to provide a clarinet or recorder like fingering scale. But one can find other tone hole combinations with similar total areas that produce similar pitches. The shorter length required for pitches at around the child's voice made the tonette ideal for carrying as well as finger placement for small hands.

The tonette came originally in basic black, but the line expanded to many colors, including camouflage green for the benefit of the armed services, who, in World War II, found the tonette to be an inexpensive and entertaining way for idle troops to pass the time.

Peter Schickele has described the tonette as "a cheap, synthetic recorder with amusing pretensions"; it is one of the instruments featured in the Gross Concerto by P. D. Q. Bach.

This instrument was played by Felix Pappalardi on "Pressed Rat and Warthog" on Cream's Wheels of Fire album.
