= Seven Whistlers =

English folklore omen

The Eurasian curlew, which the Whistlers are often identified with.

The Seven Whistlers are ill omens from English folklore, composed of seven birds that foretell or cause misfortune. Variably said to be the spirits of the dead, a transformed group of seven coal miners, or the souls of wandering Jewish people, they were a common belief among coal miners and seamen in the 19th century. In some variations, it’s a group of six searching for the seventh, and if they reunite the world will end.

== Identification ==
The Seven Whistlers are identified with several birds; such as the eurasian curlew, the corn crake, the swift, and the wigeon. One particular example, the whimbrel, notably has a 5-7 note call.

== Belief ==
Beliefs about the nature of the Seven Whistlers vary. Beliefs include that they are the souls of Jews who assisted in the crucifixion, condemned with eternal restlessness; that they are the souls of the dead, returned to warn people of danger; and that they are seven coal miners, who after either getting drunk and engaging in whistling at night for a bet were carried up into the sky and transformed.

Belief in the Seven Whistlers may have originated from the sound of bird calls and wings flapping at night being interpreted as a warning call given by spirits. The belief may be very old, and possibly related to Celtic folk beliefs surrounding voices in the wind. Belief in the Whistlers is only found in midland England.

Coal miners were known to refuse to work in the mines the day after the sound of the Whistlers was heard.

== In culture ==
The Seven Whistlers are referenced in Edmund Spenser’s 1590 epic poem The Fairy Queene, with the line “The Whistler shrill, that who so heares, doth dy”.

William Wordsworth’s poem Though narrow be that old man’s cares directly references the Seven Whistlers.

O. Henry’s short story The Door of Unrest features the Seven Whistlers, going by the story of them being the Jews who assisted with the crucifixion.
