= Shepherd's whistle =

Whistle placed in the mouth and used to communicate with sheepdogs

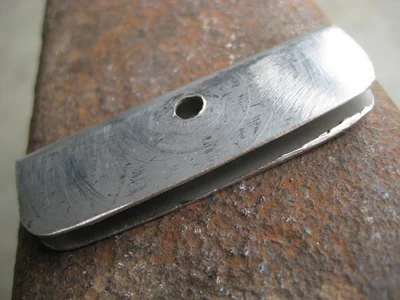
Traditional Shepherd's whistles made from a piece of folded metal.

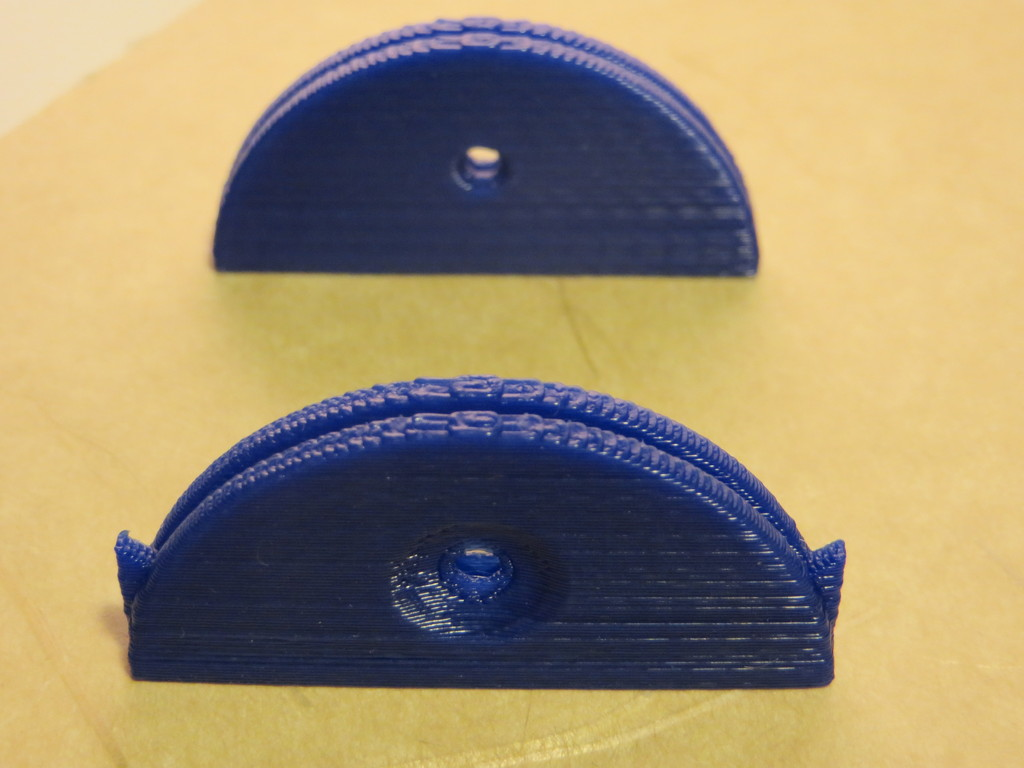
Two 3-D-printed shepherd's whistles, with and without handles.

A shepherd's whistle is a specialized, modulatable, variable-pitch whistle used to train and transmit commands to working dogs and other animals. Unlike other whistles, they are placed inside the mouth. The pitch is controlled by the placement of the tongue; physically, shepherd's whistles are vessel flutes with the tongue forming one side of the resonating chamber, and controlling its size. Like tin whistles, while simple, they can be used as musical instruments in their own right.

== Purpose ==
A shepherd's whistle is traditionally used for communicating commands to a sheepdog to aid in herding. They are typically seen used at sheepdog trials, but are also used for other working dogs including gundogs, and for falconry.

Shepherd's whistles are used to communicate clearly, and at distances up to 2 miles (3.2 km), the commands of the owner to their working dog. They produce clear, high-frequency tones of an easily modulated and variable pitch, allowing the shepherd to communicate a variety of commands. The pitch is at an optimal frequency for the herding dog's hearing, and for penetration and distance to cut through adverse weather when gathering sheep.

There are some standard whistle commands, although the commands in use vary.

If you are herding a big flock with two or three sheepdogs at once, you can control any one of the dogs, by whistling the individual command-tune which you only taught to that particular dog.

== Materials ==
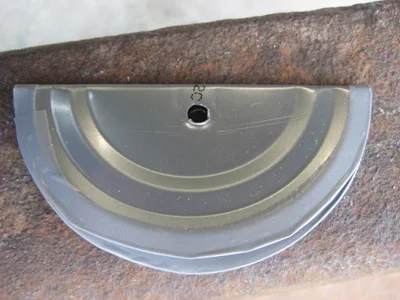
Shepherd's whistle, homemade from a steel can lid and duct tape (used to round the edge)

Oral histories have noted primitive whistles made by folding over a sheet cut from a tin, a jam lid, or dog-food lid, punching a hole, and smoothing sharp edges.

They are also produced commercially. Simple whistles may cost less than 1 USD in bulk; expensive ones may be quite ornate. They are commonly made of plastic, aluminum, stainless steel, silver, brass, titanium, Corian, jade, buffalo horn and other materials. The material affects the properties of the whistle, including the loudness, timbre, and range in pitch.

== Design ==
The size of the whistle can vary to fit the mouth of the whistler. The whistle's shape is best described as a flat circle of material, folded in half on a center line. This forms a very narrow U-shape in cross-section. The open space between the two sides is quite narrow - approximately 4–5 mm. A hole is drilled about 5 mm from the fold, through the center line of both faces.

The visible faces are then a half-circle shape. The design can also be varied to make the faces squarish, rectangular, or even a triangular A-shape, and handles or a hole for suspending the whistle as a pendant can be added.

Some whistles have two holes, to make them louder.

== Use ==
The whistle position is not at all like that of a standard whistle.

The whistle is pushed into the mouth fold-first. The curved open side of the U is the mouth of the whistle— where the air exits. The lips seal against the outside of the curved edges, such that the inside of the fold can be seen between the lips. The back of the fold is sealed against the tongue when in use, but the tongue must not block the holes. Air travels over the tongue, through the top hole, past the top of the bottom hole, and out of the mouth between the lips.

The edge of the hole acts as a fipple. The lower hole opens onto an otherwise closed pocket of air, in the space between the whistle and the bottom of the mouth. This space acts as a sound box; the sound resonates in it. Blowing over the lip of a bottle or jug also makes resonances by blowing across an opening.

Unlike typical, single-tone whistles, the shepherd's whistle can emit a range of pitches, by using the tongue and mouth to change the shape and size of the "sound box". By moving the tongue and mouth, the resonance, and therefore the sound, can be varied. See vessel flute.

A range of over an octave is possible, but whistle vary in the range of pitches and loudness they can produce; Denser material typically have greater ranges.

When a dog is trained to voice commands, whistle commands are added in parallel; when the dog is responding to the whistle commands, the voice commands can be omitted. Commands may be lengthened and loudened to get the dog's attention.

== See also ==
- Human–animal communication
- Dog whistle
- Vessel flute
