= Blown bottle =

Improvised musical instrument

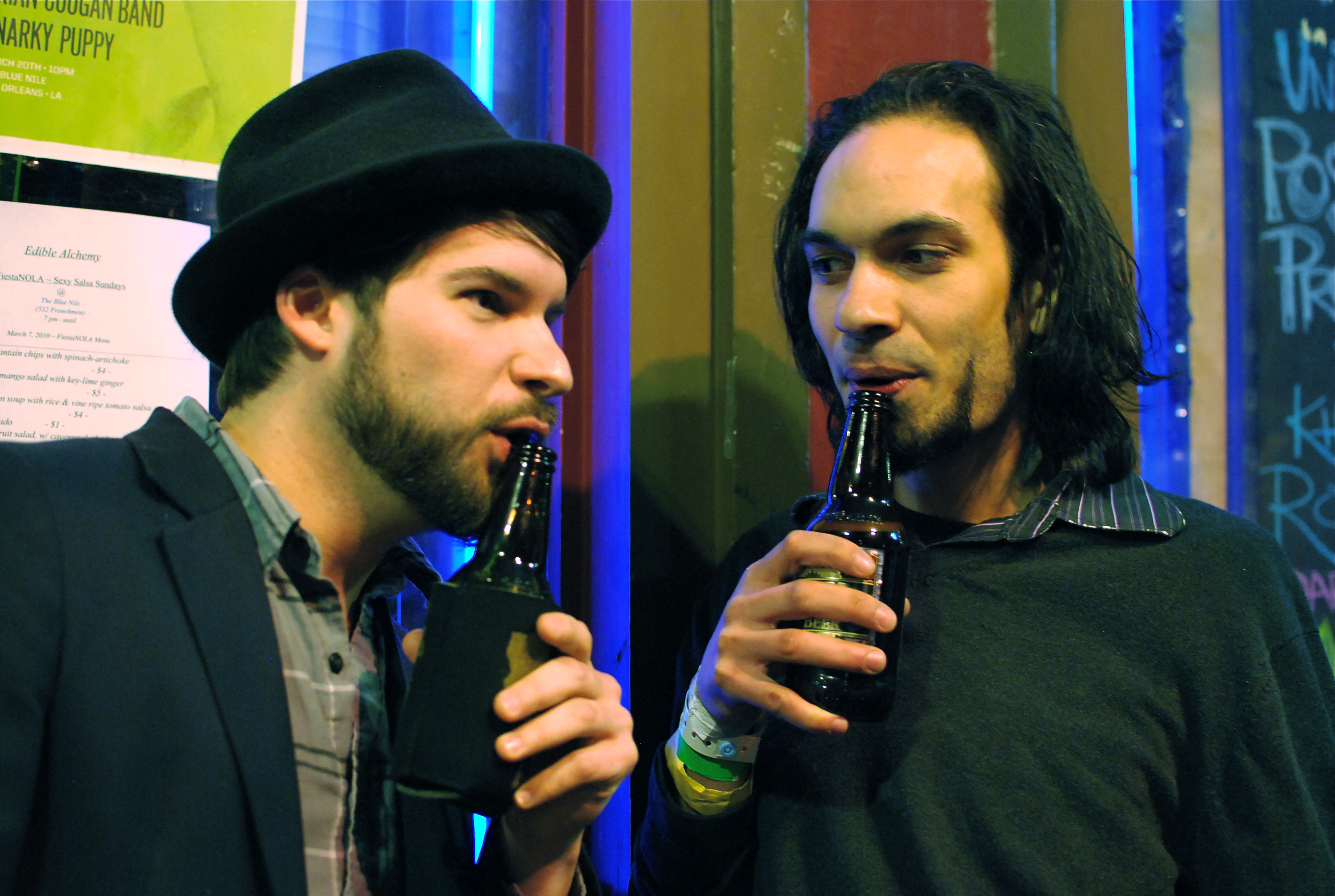
People blowing over bottles to produce a note.

Notes produced by blowing over bottles

A blown bottle is a musical instrument that produces sound when the musician blows air over the bottle opening.

Blown bottles generate sound by utilizing a vibrating column of air, a phenomenon known as Helmholtz resonance. The bottles may be tuned by adding various amounts of water or sand to the vessel.

Blown bottles, like the musical jug, are sometimes used by performers of folk music. The blown bottle is assigned to note number 76 (or 77, for numbering starting with 1) in the General MIDI specification.
