= End correction =

Correction applied to organ pipes

In acoustics, end correction is a short distance added to the length of a resonance pipe, in order to calculate the precise resonant frequency of the pipe. Whenever a wave forms through a medium/object (such as an organ pipe) with a closed/open end, the wave may form incorrectly, i.e., it may not actually start from the opening of the object but instead before the opening, producing an error when studying it theoretically. Hence an end correction is sometimes required to appropriately study its properties. The end correction depends on the radius of the object.

An acoustic pipe, such as an organ pipe, marimba, or flute resonates at a specific pitch or frequency. Longer pipes resonate at lower frequencies, producing lower-pitched sounds. In an ideal tube, the wavelength is directly proportional to the length of the tube. A tube that is open at one end and closed at the other produces sound with a wavelength equal to four times the length of the tube. A tube that is open at both ends produces sound whose wavelength is twice the length of the tube. Thus, when a Boomwhacker with two open ends is capped at one end, the pitch goes down by one octave.

The analysis above applies only to a tube of zero diameter. When designing an organ or Boomwhacker, the diameter of the tube must be taken into account. The pitch of a real tube is lower than the pitch predicted by the theory. A finite diameter pipe acts acoustically as though it were somewhat longer than its physical length.

A theoretical basis for computation of the end correction is the radiation acoustic impedance of a circular piston. This impedance represents the ratio of acoustic pressure at the piston, divided by the flow rate induced by it. The air speed is typically assumed to be uniform across the tube end. This is a good approximation, but not precisely correct, since air viscosity reduces the flow rate in the boundary layer very close to the tube surface. Thus, the air column inside the tube is loaded by the external fluid due to sound energy radiation. This requires an additional length to be added to the regular length for calculating the natural frequency of the pipe system.

The end correction is denoted by $\Delta L$ and sometimes by $e$ . In organ pipes, a displacement antinode is not formed exactly at the open end. Rather, the antinode is formed a slight distance $\Delta L$ away from the open end outside it.

This $\Delta L$ can be calculated as:

- for a closed pipe (with one opening):

$$\Delta L = 0.6 \cdot r = 0.3 \cdot D$$,
This equation increases the flute length if flute diameter is larger but reduces the length as the diameter increases. This equation is not accurate for all bore / pipe diameters. For example this is correct for G bass flute for 20mm bore diameter, but as diameter increases this equation has negative effects reducing the length. A correction for the pipe wall thickness correction must also be added.

where $r$ is the radius of the neck and $D$ is the hydraulic diameter of the neck;

- and for an open pipe (with two openings):

$$\Delta L = 1.2 \cdot r = 0.6 \cdot D$$.

The exact number for the end correction depends on the geometry of the pipe. Lord Rayleigh was the first experimenter to publish a figure, in 1871: it was $0.3 \cdot r$. Other experiments yielded results such as $0.576 \cdot r$ and $0.66 \cdot r$. The end correction for ideal cylindrical tubes was calculated to be $0.6133 \cdot r$ by Levine and Schwinger.

== Sources ==
- Mouth Correction.
