= Pifana =

Type of gems horn played in Corsica

The pifana is a type of gemshorn played in Corsica. The pifana is generally made from goat horn.
