= Nose whistle =

Small musical instrument

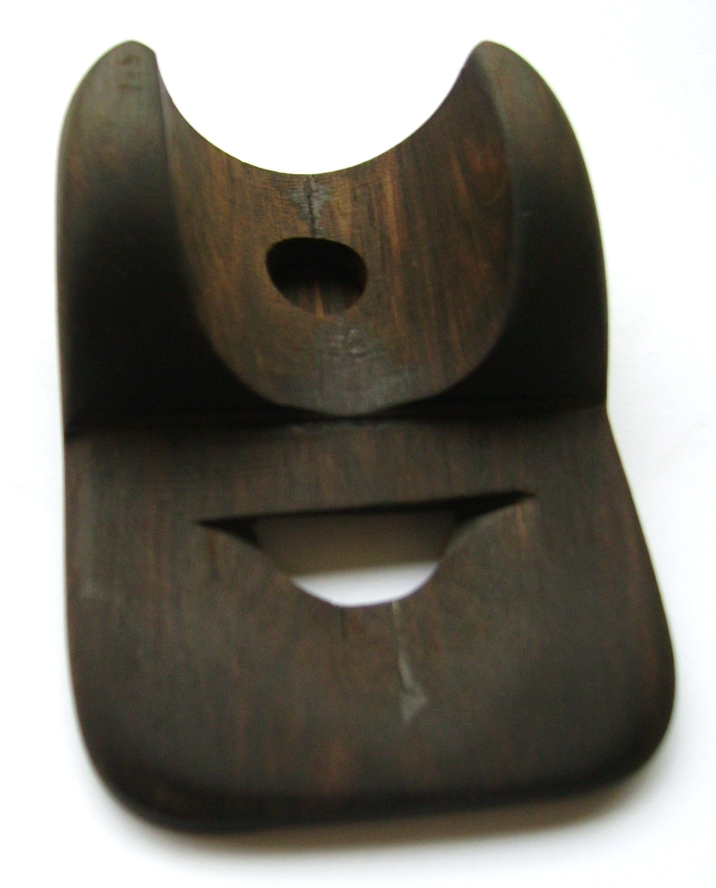
A rosewood nose whistle. The player puts one's nose on the upper hole. The air is directed towards the lower edge, where the open mouth makes the sound.

Sound of nose whistle

A nose whistle (also called a "nose flute" or a "humanatone") is a wind instrument played with the nose and mouth cavity. Often made of wood, they are also constructed with plastic, clay, or sheet metal.

== History ==
Nose whistles, possibly with different sound producing mechanisms, are used traditionally by various South American indigenous groups in the Amazon rainforest, such as the Nambikwara. While representing fertility or war by some groups within the Nambikwara, the nose flute ("ta tãu sư" in Nambikwaran) was not used as a ritual instrument, and was more commonly a children's toy. The Piaroa by contrast used the instrument ("Chuvo" in Wötʰïhä tivene) alongside other flutes in ritual situations, where it represented masculinity and was played during wartime. However, a clear connection between the nose whistles used by South American indigenous and the models described in this article, in terms of working principles and cultural transmission, has not been fully established.

In spite of its possible ethnic background, models were conceived and patented in the 19th and 20th centuries. James J. Stivers, co-founder of the Humanatone Company, is credited to coining this instrument as a "Humanatone". Operating out of New York City, his nose whistles were made of tin plates.

Today, nose whistles are often sold as children's novelties and are made of plastic, although enthusiasts use techniques to modify instruments for easier use by adults, as well as better sound. Using beeswax to extend the nose cup to accommodate an adult's larger maxilla is one such technique.

== Acoustics ==
The nose blows air into the instrument's open nose cup, from where it is channeled through an air duct towards a sharp edge (fipple) positioned over the player's mouth opening. The placement of the edge helps to create a vortex that excites the acoustic field into the player's mouth cavity. The pitch and tone is then changed by the musician via moving their mouth and tongue, as well as variating air flow. The mouth cavity is the functional resonance chamber determining the tone of the instrument, as opposed to the chamber's volume and length being altered by holes or buttons, as is the case with flutes and recorders. The nose-whistle behaves acoustically like a Helmholtz resonator, the closest conventional instrument being an ocarina.

Effectively, the nose whistle may produce an extense glissando, in a rather wide range of more than three octaves .

== Examples ==
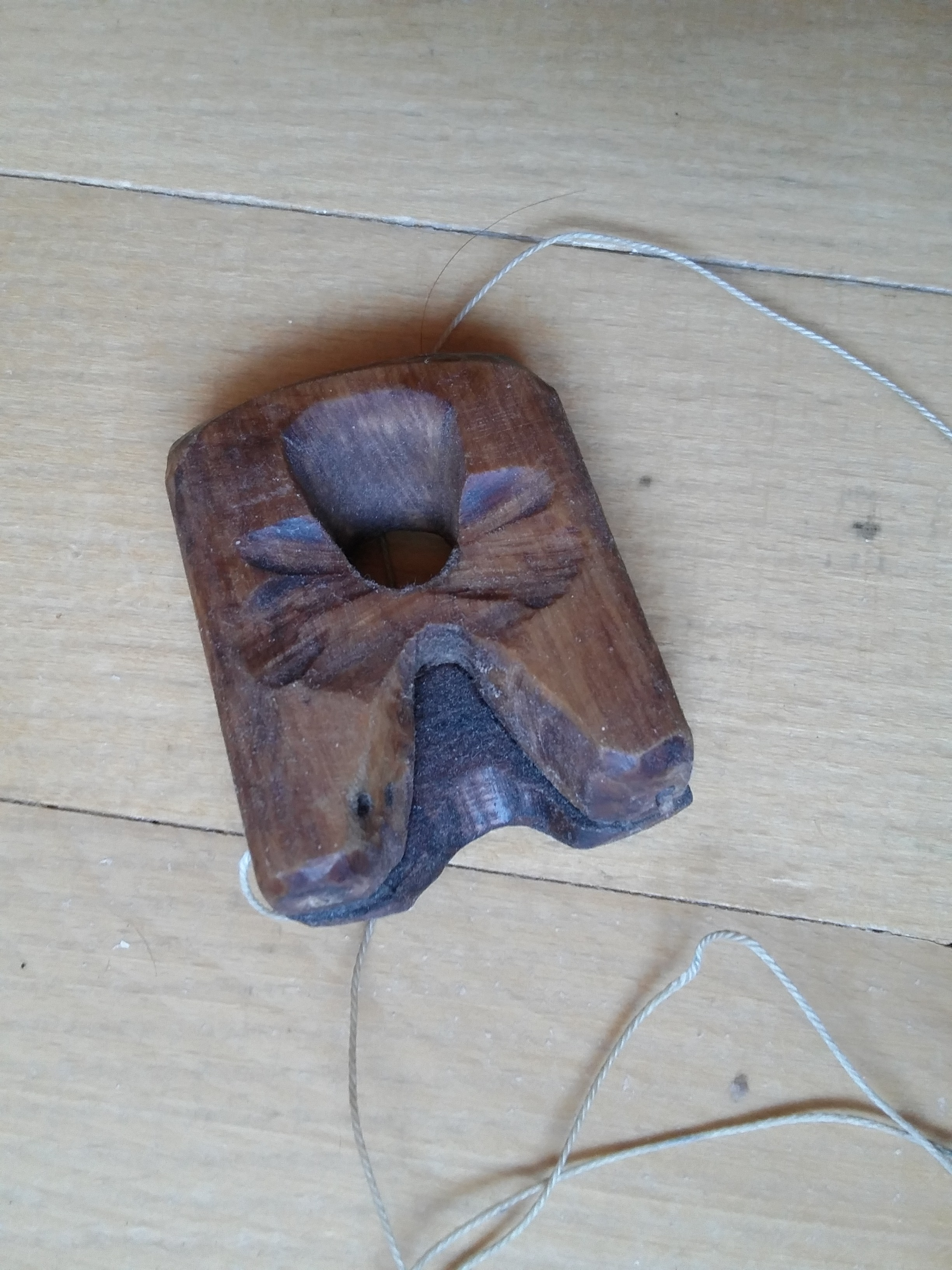
Hand-carved wooden nose whistle

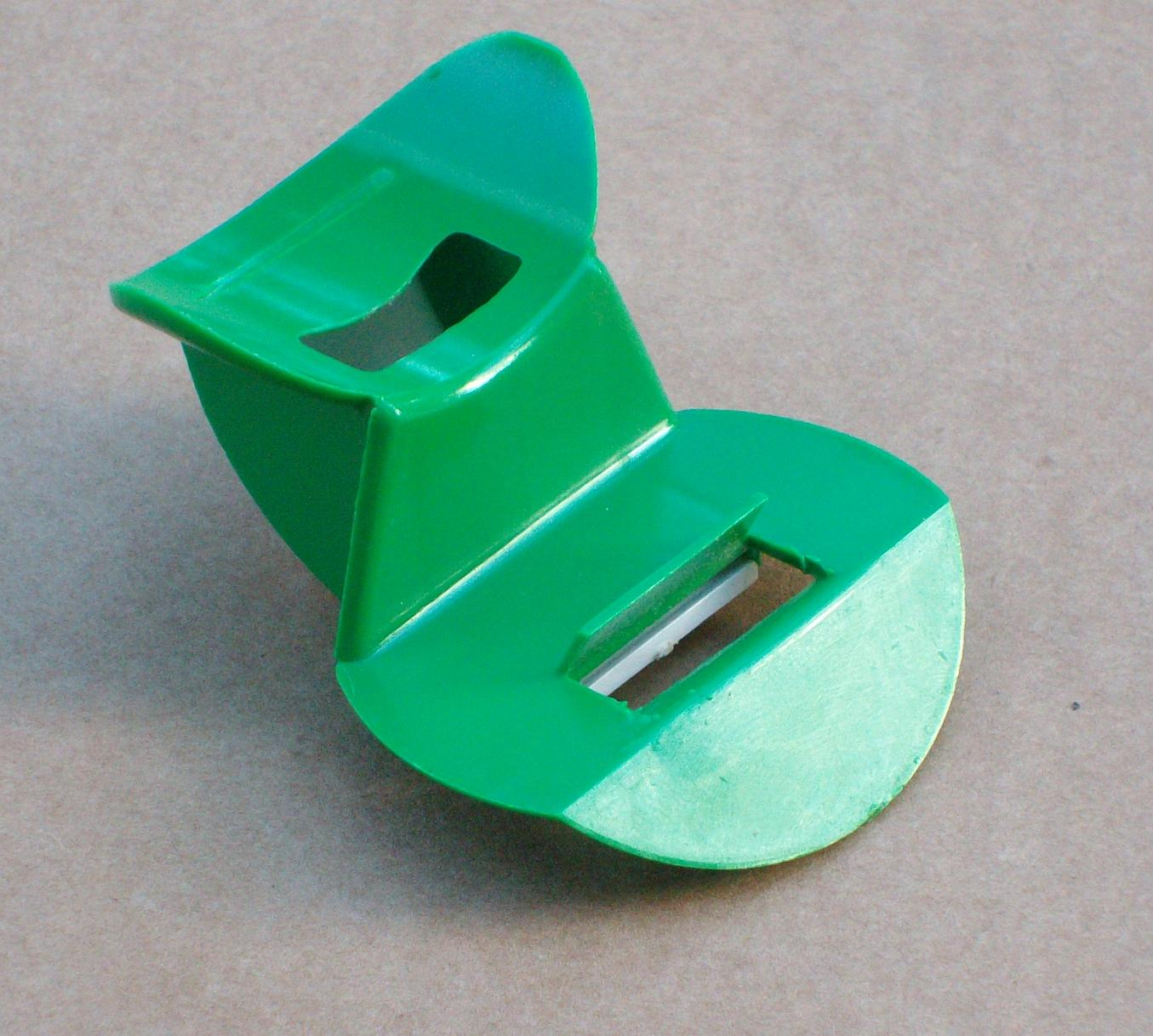
Commercially manufactured nose whistle made in Germany

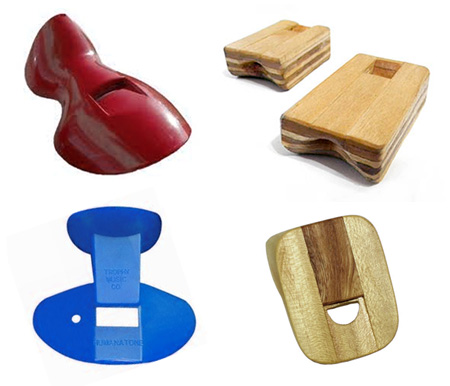
Wooden and plastic manufactured nose whistle

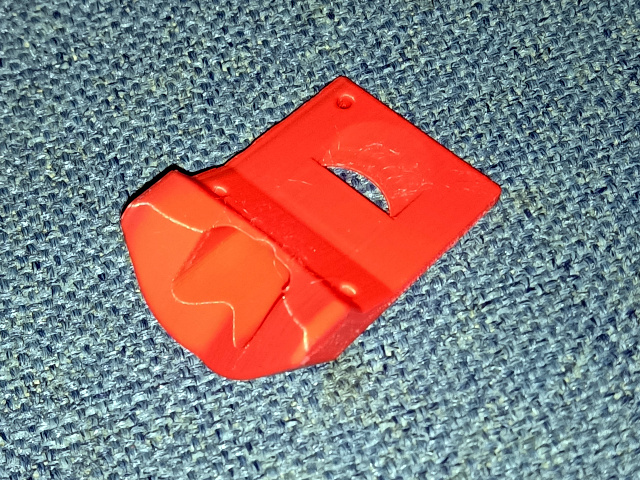
3D printed nose whistle

== See also ==
- Nose flute
- Ocarina
- Helmholtz resonance
