= Acoustic resonance =

Resonance phenomena in sound and musical devices

Experiment using two tuning forks oscillating at the same frequency. One of the forks is being hit with a rubberized mallet. Although the first tuning fork hasn't been hit, the other fork is visibly excited due to the oscillation caused by the periodic change in the pressure and density of the air by hitting the other fork, creating an acoustic resonance between the forks. However, if a piece of metal is placed on a prong, the effect dampens, and the excitations become less and less pronounced as resonance isn't achieved as effectively.

Acoustic resonance is a phenomenon in which an acoustic system responds strongly to sound waves whose frequency matches one of its own natural frequencies of vibration (its resonance frequencies).

The term "acoustic resonance" is sometimes used to narrow mechanical resonance to the frequency range of human hearing, but since acoustics is defined in general terms concerning vibrational waves in matter, acoustic resonance can occur at frequencies outside the range of human hearing.

An acoustically resonant object usually has more than one resonance frequency, especially at harmonics of the strongest resonance. It will easily vibrate at those frequencies, and vibrate less strongly at other frequencies. It will "pick out" its resonance frequency from a complex excitation, such as an impulse or a wideband noise excitation. In effect, it is filtering out all frequencies other than its resonance.

Acoustic resonance is an important consideration for instrument builders, as most acoustic instruments use resonators, such as the strings and body of a violin, the length of tube in a flute, and the shape of a drum membrane. Acoustic resonance is also important for hearing. For example, resonance of a stiff structural element, called the basilar membrane within the cochlea of the inner ear allows hair cells on the membrane to detect sound. (For mammals the membrane has tapering resonances across its length so that high frequencies are concentrated on one end and low frequencies on the other.)

Like mechanical resonance, acoustic resonance can result in catastrophic failure of the vibrator. The classic example of this is breaking a wine glass with sound at the precise resonant frequency of the glass.

== Vibrating string ==
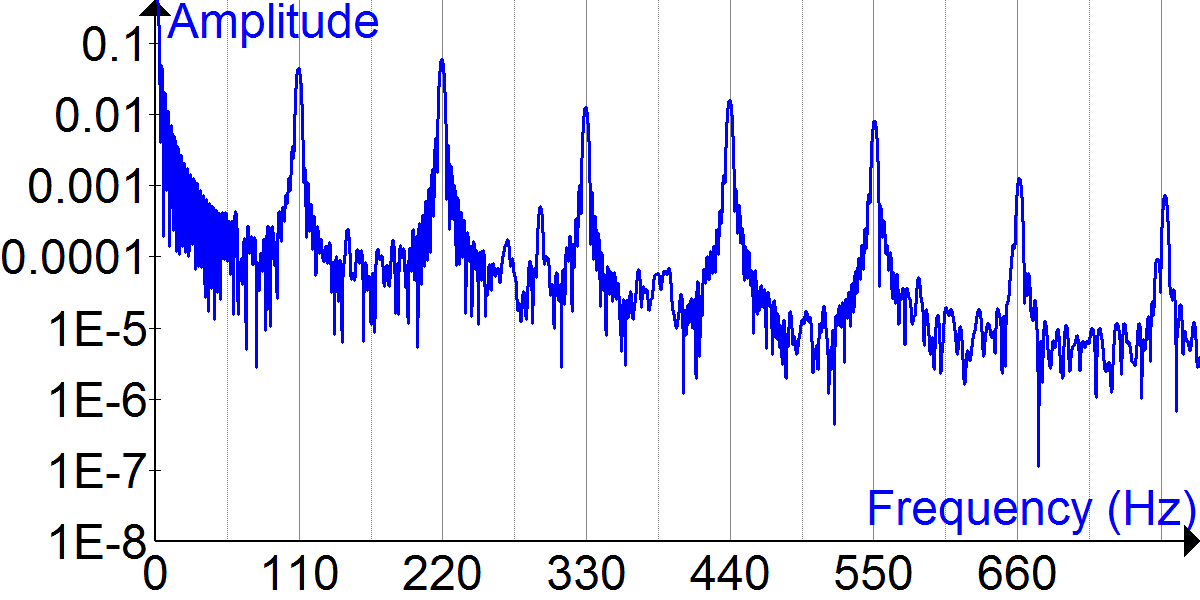
String resonance of a bass guitar A note with fundamental frequency of 110 Hz.

In musical instruments, strings under tension, as in lutes, harps, guitars, pianos, violins and so forth, have resonant frequencies determined primarily by string length, mass per unit length, and tension. In the ideal string model, the fundamental resonance has a wavelength equal to twice the string length. Higher resonances correspond to wavelengths that are integer divisions of the fundamental wavelength. The corresponding frequencies are related to the speed v of a wave traveling down the string by the equation

$$f = {nv \over 2L}$$

where L is the length of the string (for a string fixed at both ends) n = 1, 2, 3...(Harmonic). The speed of a wave through a string or wire is related to its tension T and the mass per unit length ρ:

$$v = \sqrt {T \over \rho}$$

So the frequency is related to the properties of the string by the equation

$$f = {n\sqrt {T \over \rho} \over 2 L} = {n\sqrt {T \over m / L} \over 2 L}$$

Under these assumptions, the resonant frequencies form an exact harmonic series. Higher tension and shorter lengths increase the resonant frequencies. When the string is excited with an impulsive function (a finger pluck or a strike by a hammer), the string vibrates at all the frequencies present in the impulse (an impulsive has broad frequency content.) Those frequencies that are not one of the resonances are quickly filtered out—they are attenuated—and all that is left is the harmonic vibrations that we hear as a musical note.

Measurements of piano strings show that their partials are not exact integer multiples of the fundamental frequency. Robert W. Young measured the inharmonicity of plain steel piano strings in situ in six pianos of different sizes and makes. He showed that the frequency deviation increases with mode number and depends on string diameter and vibrating length. The results follow stiff-string theory, which predicts a quadratic dependence on mode number and an inverse fourth-power dependence on string length. Young found that inharmonicity near middle C is similar across pianos but is lower in larger instruments and increases rapidly at higher pitches.

=== String resonance in music instruments ===
String resonance occurs on string instruments. In some cases, a string may be excited indirectly by another sounding string if their harmonic frequencies are closely related, producing sympathetic vibration. For example, an A string at 440 Hz can excite an E string at 330 Hz because both produce a harmonic near 1320 Hz, allowing energy transfer between the strings.

== Resonance of a tube of air ==
The resonance of a tube of air is related to the length of the tube, its shape, and whether it has closed or open ends. Many musical instruments resemble tubes that are conical or cylindrical (see bore). A pipe that is closed at one end and open at the other is said to be stopped or closed while an open pipe is open at both ends. Modern orchestral flutes behave as open cylindrical pipes; clarinets behave as closed cylindrical pipes; and saxophones, oboes, and bassoons as closed conical pipes, while most modern lip-reed instruments (brass instruments) are acoustically similar to closed conical pipes with some deviations (see pedal tones and false tones). Like strings, vibrating air columns in ideal cylindrical or conical pipes also have resonances at harmonics, although there are some differences.

=== Cylinders ===
Any cylinder resonates at multiple frequencies, producing multiple musical pitches. The lowest frequency is called the fundamental frequency or the first harmonic. Cylinders used as musical instruments are generally open, either at both ends, like a flute, or at one end, like some organ pipes. However, a cylinder closed at both ends can also be used to create or visualize sound waves, as in a Rubens Tube.

The resonance properties of a cylinder may be understood by considering the behavior of a sound wave in air. Sound travels as a longitudinal compression wave, causing air molecules to move back and forth along the direction of travel. Within a tube, a standing wave is formed, whose wavelength depends on the length of the tube. At the closed end of the tube, air molecules cannot move much, so this end of the tube is a displacement node in the standing wave. At the open end of the tube, air molecules can move freely, producing a displacement antinode. Displacement nodes are pressure antinodes and vice versa.

In real cylinders, resonances deviate from the ideal harmonic series. Effects such as end correction, radiation impedance, and interaction between the air jet and the resonator shift the higher modes. Practical pipes are only approximately harmonic.

==== Closed at both ends ====
The table below shows the displacement waves in a cylinder closed at both ends. Note that the air molecules near the closed ends cannot move, whereas the molecules near the center of the pipe move freely. In the first harmonic, the closed tube contains exactly half of a standing wave (node-antinode-node). Considering the pressure wave in this setup, the two closed ends are the antinodes for the change in pressure Δp; Therefore, at both ends, the change in pressure Δp must have the maximal amplitude (or satisfy ∂(Δp)/∂x = 0 in the form of the Sturm–Liouville formulation), which gives the equation for the pressure wave: $\Delta p(x,t) = p_\text{max}\cos \left({2\pi x \over \lambda} \right) \cos(\omega t)$. The intuition for this boundary condition ∂(Δp)/∂x = 0 at x = 0 and x = L is that the pressure of the closed ends will follow that of the point next to them. Applying the boundary condition ∂(Δp)/∂x = 0 at x = L gives the wavelengths of the standing waves:

$$\lambda = \frac{2L}{n}; n=1,2,3,...$$

And the resonant frequencies are

$$f = \frac{v}{\lambda} = \frac{nv}{2L}.$$

Frequency	Order	Name 1	Name 2	Name 3	Wave representation	Molecular representation
1 · f = 440 Hz	n = 1	1st partial	fundamental tone	1st harmonic		
2 · f = 880 Hz	n = 2	2nd partial	1st overtone	2nd harmonic		
3 · f = 1320 Hz	n = 3	3rd partial	2nd overtone	3rd harmonic		
4 · f = 1760 Hz	n = 4	4th partial	3rd overtone	4th harmonic		

==== Open at both ends ====
In cylinders with both ends open, air molecules near the end move freely in and out of the tube. This movement produces displacement antinodes in the standing wave. Nodes tend to form inside the cylinder, away from the ends. In the first harmonic, the open tube contains exactly half of a standing wave (antinode-node-antinode). Thus the harmonics of the open cylinder are calculated in the same way as the harmonics of a closed/closed cylinder.

The physics of a pipe open at both ends are explained in Physics Classroom. Note that the diagrams in this reference show displacement waves, similar to the ones shown above. These stand in sharp contrast to the pressure waves shown near the end of the present article.

By overblowing an open tube, a note can be obtained that is an octave above the fundamental frequency or note of the tube. For example, if the fundamental note of an open pipe is C1, then overblowing the pipe gives C2, which is an octave above C1.

Open cylindrical tubes resonate at the approximate frequencies:

$$f = {nv \over 2L}$$

where n is a positive integer (1, 2, 3...) representing the resonance node, L is the length of the tube and v is the speed of sound in air (which is approximately 343 metres per second [770 mph] at 20 °C [68 °F]). This equation comes from the boundary conditions for the pressure wave, which treats the open ends as pressure nodes where the change in pressure Δp must be zero.

A more accurate equation considering an end correction is given below:

$$f = {nv \over 2(L+0.6d)}$$

where r is the radius of the resonance tube. This equation compensates for the fact that the exact point at which a sound wave is reflecting at an open end is not perfectly at the end section of the tube, but a small distance outside the tube.

The reflection ratio is slightly less than 1; the open end does not behave like an infinitesimal acoustic impedance; rather, it has a finite value, called radiation impedance, which is dependent on the diameter of the tube, the wavelength, and the type of reflection board possibly present around the opening of the tube.

So when n is 1:

$$f = {v \over 2(L+0.6d)}$$
$${f(2(L+0.6d))} = v$$
$${f\lambda} = v$$
$$\lambda = {2(L+0.6d)}$$

where v is the speed of sound, L is the length of the resonant tube, d is the diameter of the tube, f is the resonant sound frequency, and λ is the resonant wavelength.

==== Closed at one end ====
When used in an organ a tube which is closed at one end is called a "stopped pipe". Such cylinders have a fundamental frequency but can be overblown to produce other higher frequencies or notes. These overblown registers can be tuned by using different degrees of conical taper. A closed tube resonates at the same fundamental frequency as an open tube twice its length, with a wavelength equal to four times its length. In a closed tube, a displacement node, or point of no vibration, always appears at the closed end and if the tube is resonating, it will have a displacement antinode, or point of greatest vibration at the Phi point (length × 0.618) near the open end.

By overblowing a cylindrical closed tube, a note can be obtained that is approximately a twelfth above the fundamental note of the tube, or a fifth above the octave of the fundamental note. For example, if the fundamental note of a closed pipe is C1, then overblowing the pipe gives G2, which is one-twelfth above C1. Alternatively we can say that G2 is one-fifth above C2 — the octave above C1. Adjusting the taper of this cylinder for a decreasing cone can tune the second harmonic or overblown note close to the octave position or 8th. Opening a small "speaker hole" at the Phi point, or shared "wave/node" position will cancel the fundamental frequency and force the tube to resonate at a 12th above the fundamental. This technique is used in a recorder by pinching open the dorsal thumb hole. Moving this small hole upwards, closer to the voicing will make it an "Echo Hole" (Dolmetsch Recorder Modification) that will give a precise half note above the fundamental when opened. Note: Slight size or diameter adjustment is needed to zero in on the precise half note frequency.

A closed tube will have approximate resonances of:

$$f = {nv \over 4L}$$

where "n" here is an odd number (1, 3, 5...). This type of tube produces only odd harmonics and has its fundamental frequency an octave lower than that of an open cylinder (that is, half the frequency). This equation comes from the boundary conditions for the pressure wave, which treats the closed end as pressure antinodes where the change in pressure Δp must have the maximal amplitude, or satisfy ∂(Δp)/∂x = 0 in the form of the Sturm–Liouville formulation. The intuition for this boundary condition ∂(Δp)/∂x = 0 at x = L is that the pressure of the closed end will follow that of the point next to it.

A more accurate equation considering an end correction is given below:

$$f = {nv \over 4(L+0.3d)}$$.

Again, when n is 1:

$$f = {v \over 4(L+0.3d)}$$
$${f(4(L+0.3d))} = v$$
$${f\lambda} = v$$
$$\lambda = {4(L+0.3d)}$$

where v is the speed of sound, L is the length of the resonant tube, d is the diameter of the tube, f is the resonant sound frequency, and λ is the resonant wavelength.

==== Pressure wave ====
In the two diagrams below are shown the first three resonances of the pressure wave in a cylindrical tube, with antinodes at the closed end of the pipe. In diagram 1, the tube is open at both ends. In diagram 2, it is closed at one end. The horizontal axis is pressure. Note that in this case, the open end of the pipe is a pressure node while the closed end is a pressure antinode.

1

2

=== Cones ===
An open conical tube, that is, one in the shape of a frustum of a cone with both ends open, will have resonant frequencies approximately equal to those of an open cylindrical pipe of the same length.

The resonant frequencies of a stopped conical tube — a complete cone or frustum with one end closed — satisfy a more complicated condition:

$kL = n\pi - \tan^{-1} kx$

where the wavenumber k is

$$k = 2\pi f/v$$

and x is the distance from the small end of the frustum to the vertex. When x is small, that is, when the cone is nearly complete, this becomes

$$k(L+x) \approx n\pi$$

leading to resonant frequencies approximately equal to those of an open cylinder whose length equals L + x. In other words, a complete conical pipe behaves approximately like an open cylindrical pipe of the same length, and to first order the behaviour does not change if the complete cone is replaced by a closed frustum of that cone.

=== Closed rectangular box ===
Sound waves in a rectangular box include such examples as loudspeaker enclosures and buildings. Rectangular buildings have resonances described as room modes. For a rectangular box, the resonant frequencies are given by

$$f = {v \over 2} \sqrt{\left({\ell \over L_x}\right)^2 + \left({m \over L_y}\right)^2 + \left({n \over L_z}\right)^2}$$

where v is the speed of sound, L_{x} and L_{y} and L_{z} are the dimensions of the box. $\ell$, $m$, and $n$ are nonnegative integers that cannot all be zero. If the small loudspeaker box is airtight, the frequency low enough and the compression is high enough, the sound pressure (decibel level) inside the box will be the same anywhere inside the box, this is hydraulic pressure.

== Resonance of a sphere of air (vented) ==
The resonant frequency of a rigid cavity of static volume V_{0} with a necked sound hole of area A and length L is given by the Helmholtz resonance formula

$$f = \frac{v}{2\pi}\sqrt{\frac{A}{V_0 L_{eq}}}$$

where $L_{eq}$ is the equivalent length of the neck with end correction

$L_{eq}= L+0.75d$ for an unflanged neck
$L_{eq}= L+0.85d$ for a flanged neck

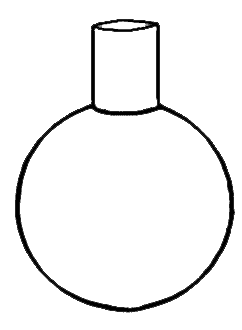

For a spherical cavity, the resonant frequency formula becomes

$$f = \frac{vd}{\pi}\sqrt{\frac{3}{8L_{eq}D^3} }$$

where

D = diameter of sphere
d = diameter of sound hole

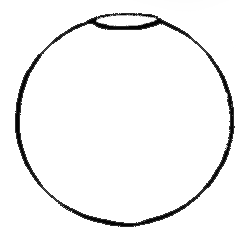

For a sphere with just a sound hole, L=0 and the surface of the sphere acts as a flange, so

$$f = \frac{vd}{\pi}\sqrt{\frac{3}{8(0.85d)D^3} }$$

In dry air at 20 °C, with d and D in metres, f in hertz, this becomes

$$f = 72.6\sqrt{\frac{d}{D^3}}$$

== Breaking glass with sound via resonance ==
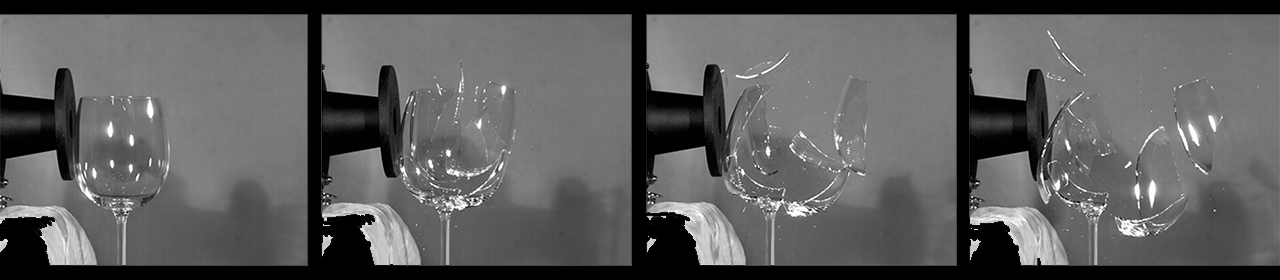
Breaking glass with sound using resonance

This is a classic demonstration of resonance. A glass has a natural resonance, a frequency at which the glass will vibrate easily. Therefore the glass needs to be moved by the sound wave at that frequency. If the force from the sound wave making the glass vibrate is big enough, the size of the vibration will become so large that the glass fractures. To do it reliably for a science demonstration requires practice and careful choice of the glass and loudspeaker.

== In musical composition ==
Several composers have begun to make resonance the subject of compositions. Alvin Lucier has used acoustic instruments and sine wave generators to explore the resonance of objects large and small in many of his compositions. The complex inharmonic partials of a swell shaped crescendo and decrescendo on a tamtam or other percussion instrument interact with room resonances in James Tenney's Koan: Having Never Written A Note For Percussion. Pauline Oliveros and Stuart Dempster regularly perform in large reverberant spaces such as the 2-million-US-gallon (7,600 m^{3}) cistern at Fort Worden, WA, which has a reverb with a 45-second decay. Malmö Academy of Music composition professor and composer Kent Olofsson's "Terpsichord, a piece for percussion and pre-recorded sounds, [uses] the resonances from the acoustic instruments [to] form sonic bridges to the pre-recorded electronic sounds, that, in turn, prolong the resonances, re-shaping them into new sonic gestures."

== See also ==
- Harmony
- Music theory
- Resonance
- Reverberation
- Standing wave
- Sympathetic string
- Reflection phase change
