= Helmholtz resonance =

Phenomenon of air resonance in a cavity

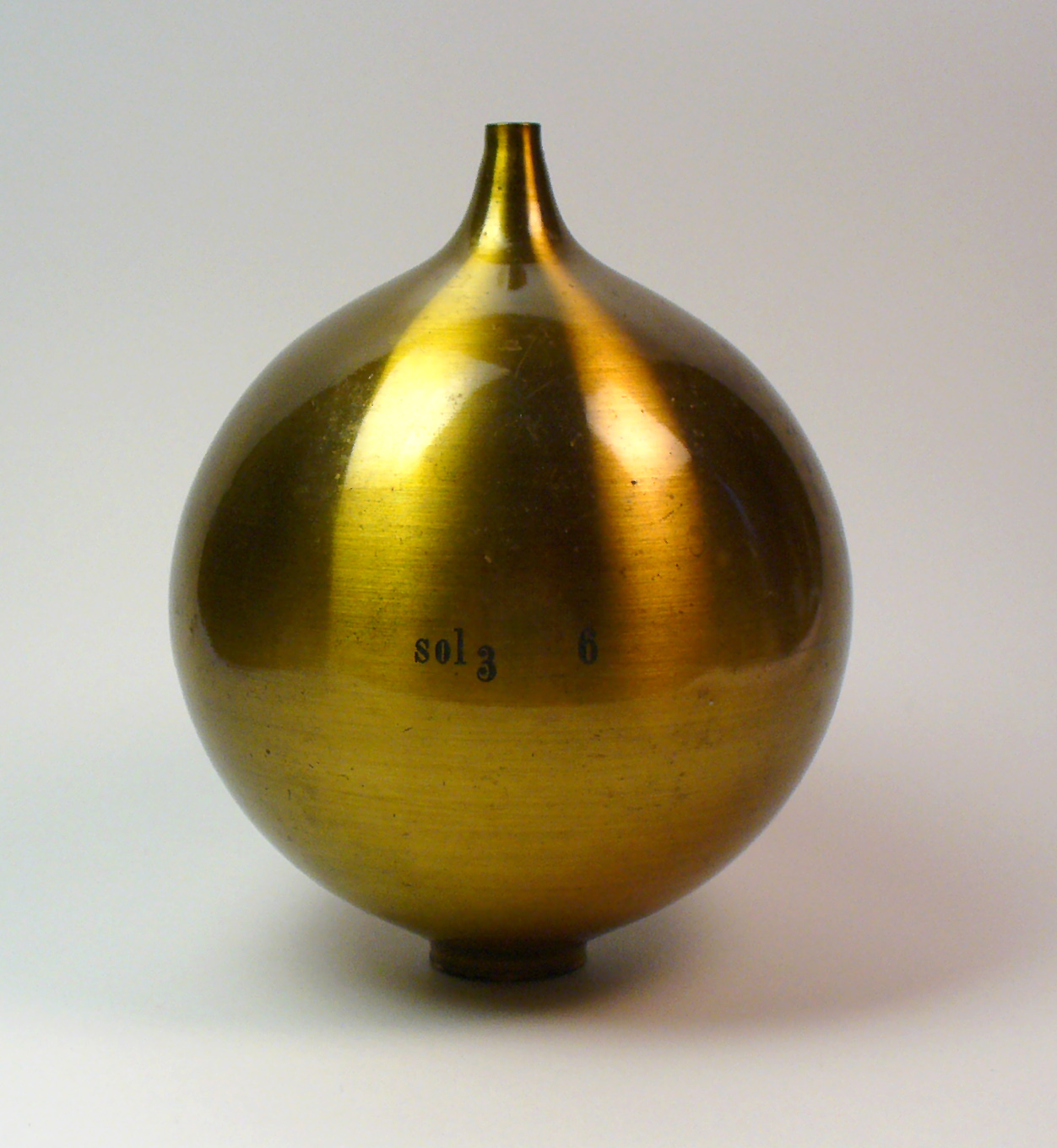
A brass, spherical Helmholtz resonator based on his original design, circa 1890–1900

Helmholtz resonance, also known as wind throb, refers to the phenomenon of air resonance in a cavity, an effect named after the German physicist Hermann von Helmholtz. This type of resonance occurs when air is forced in and out of a cavity (the resonance chamber), causing the air inside to vibrate at a specific natural frequency. The principle is widely observable in everyday life, notably when blowing across the top of a bottle, resulting in a resonant tone.

The concept of Helmholtz resonance is fundamental in various fields, including acoustics, engineering, and physics. The resonator itself, termed a Helmholtz resonator, consists of two key components: a cavity and a neck. The size and shape of these components are crucial in determining the resonant frequency, which is the frequency at which the system naturally oscillates.

In the context of acoustics, Helmholtz resonance is instrumental in the design and analysis of musical instruments, architectural acoustics, and sound engineering. It is also utilized in automotive engineering for noise reduction and in designing exhaust systems.

The underlying principle involves the vibration of the air mass in the neck of the resonator, acting analogously to a mass on a spring. When external forces, such as airflow, disturb this air mass, it oscillates and causes the air within the cavity to resonate. This phenomenon is characterized by its sharp and high-amplitude resonance curve, making it distinct from other types of acoustic resonance.

Since its conceptualization in the 19th century, Helmholtz resonance has continued to be a subject of study and application, illustrating the interplay between simple physical systems and complex vibrational phenomena.

== History ==
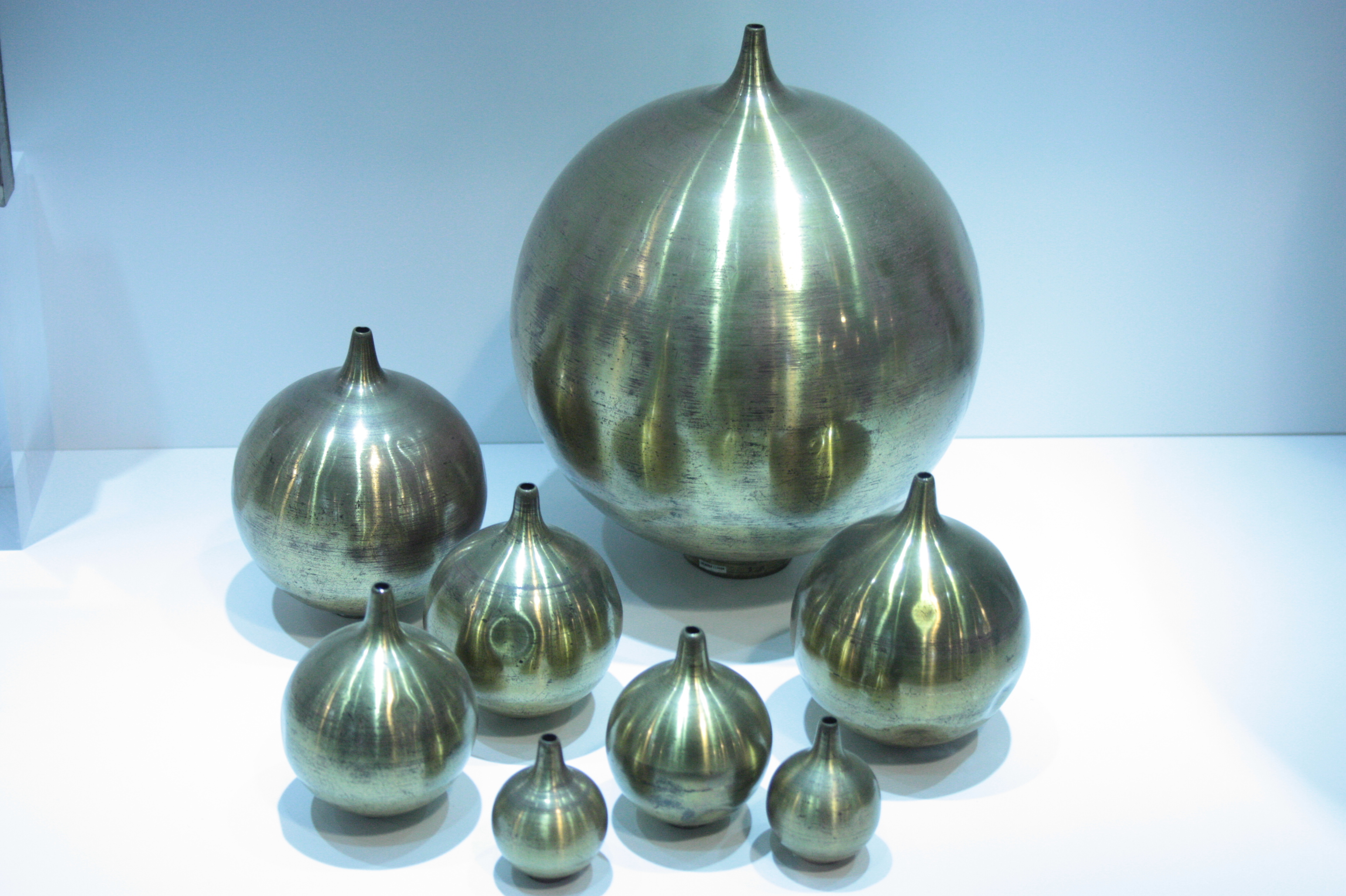
A selection of Helmholtz resonators from 1870, at Hunterian Museum and Art Gallery in Glasgow

Helmholtz described in his 1863 book On the Sensations of Tone an apparatus able to pick out specific frequencies from a complex sound, which is now known as a Helmholtz resonator. It consists of a rigid container of a known volume, nearly spherical in shape, with a small neck and hole in one end and a larger hole in the other end to emit the sound.

When the resonator's 'nipple' is placed inside one's ear, a specific frequency of the complex sound can be picked out and heard clearly. In his book Helmholtz explains: When we "apply a resonator to the ear, most of the tones produced in the surrounding air will be considerably damped; but if the proper tone of the resonator is sounded, it brays into the ear most powerfully. ... The proper tone of the resonator may even be sometimes heard cropping up in the whistling of the wind, the rattling of carriage wheels, the splashing of water."

A set of varied size resonators was sold to be used as discrete acoustic filters for the spectral analysis of complex sounds. There is also an adjustable type, called a universal resonator, which consists of two cylinders, one inside the other, which can slide in or out to change the volume of the cavity over a continuous range. An array of 10 of this type of resonator was employed in a mechanical Fourier sound analyzer designed by Rudolph Koenig. This resonator can also emit a variable-frequency tone when driven by a stream of air in the "tone variator" invented by William Stern, 1897.

When air is forced into a cavity, the pressure inside increases. When the external force pushing the air into the cavity is removed, the higher-pressure air inside will flow out. Due to the inertia of the moving air the cavity will be left at a pressure slightly lower than the outside, causing air to be drawn back in. This process repeats, with the magnitude of the pressure oscillations increasing and decreasing asymptotically after the sound starts and stops.

The port (the neck of the chamber) is placed in the ear, allowing the experimenter to hear the sound and to determine its loudness. The resonant mass of air in the chamber is set in motion through the second hole, which is larger and doesn't have a neck.

A gastropod seashell can form a Helmholtz resonator with low Q factor, amplifying many frequencies, resulting in the "sounds of the sea".

The term Helmholtz resonator is now more generally applied to include bottles from which sound is generated by blowing air across the mouth of the bottle. In this case the length and diameter of the bottle neck also contribute to the resonance frequency and its Q factor.

By one definition a Helmholtz resonator augments the amplitude of the vibratory motion of the enclosed air in a chamber by taking energy from sound waves passing in the surrounding air. In the other definition the sound waves are generated by a uniform stream of air flowing across the open top of an enclosed volume of air.

== Resonant frequency ==
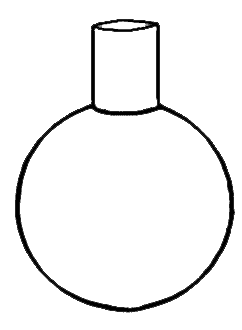

By making a few assumptions and considering the mass of fluid in the neck and pressure changes in the body, the resonant frequency of a Helmholtz resonator can be derived to be:

$\omega_{H} = \sqrt{\gamma\frac{A^2}{m} \frac{P_0}{V_0}}$ (rad/s),

or alternatively:

$$\omega_{H} = v\sqrt{\frac{A}{V_0 L_{eq}}}$$.

where:

- $\gamma$ (gamma) is the adiabatic index or ratio of specific heats. This value is usually 1.4 for air and diatomic gases.
- $A$ is the cross-sectional area of the neck (assumed to be constant);
- $m$ is the mass in the neck;
- $P_0$ is the static pressure in the cavity;
- $V_0$ is the static volume of the cavity;
- $v$ is the speed of sound in a gas;
- $L_{eq}$ is the equivalent length of the neck with end correction, which can be calculated as: $L_{eq} = L_n + 0.3 D$, where $L_n$ is the actual length of the neck and $D$ is the hydraulic diameter of the neck;
- $V_n$ is the volume of air in the neck.

These two formulations can be shown to be equal using:

- The cross-sectional area of the neck is $A = \frac{V_n}{L_{eq}}$ ,

which gives $\quad \omega_{H} = \sqrt{\gamma\frac{A}{m} \frac{V_n}{L_{eq}} \frac{P_0}{V_0}}$,

- and then the speed of sound in a gas is $v = \sqrt{\gamma\frac{P_0}{\rho}}$,
- and the density of the air in the neck, $\rho$ is: $\rho = \frac{m}{V_n}$.

Finally, dividing by $2\pi$ gives the resonant frequency:

$$f_{H} = \frac{v}{2\pi}\sqrt{\frac{A}{V_0 L_{eq}}}$$.

The length of the neck appears in the denominator because the inertia of the air in the neck is proportional to the length. The volume of the cavity appears in the denominator because the spring constant of the air in the cavity is inversely proportional to its volume. Increasing the area of the neck increases the inertia of the air proportionately, but also decreases the velocity at which the air rushes in and out.

Depending on the exact shape of the hole, the relative thickness of the sheet with respect to the size of the hole and the size of the cavity, this formula can have limitations. More sophisticated formulae can still be derived analytically, with similar physical explanations (although some differences matter). Furthermore, if the mean flow over the resonator is high (typically with a Mach number above 0.3), some corrections must be applied.

== Applications ==
=== Automotive ===
Helmholtz resonance sometimes occurs when a slightly open single car window makes a very loud sound, also called side window buffeting or wind throb. Because cars have a large volume, the frequency of the wind throb is quite low.

Helmholtz resonance finds application in internal combustion engines, especially the airbox. Intake systems described as 'Helmholtz Systems' have been used in the Chrysler V10 engine built for both the Dodge Viper and the Ram pickup, and several of the Buell tube-frame series of motorcycles.

The theory of Helmholtz resonators is used in motorcycle and car exhausts to alter the sound of the exhaust note and for differences in power delivery by adding chambers to the exhaust. Exhaust resonators are also used to reduce potentially loud engine noise where the dimensions are calculated so that the waves reflected by the resonator help cancel out certain frequencies of sound in the exhaust. In some two-stroke engines, a Helmholtz resonator is used to remove the need for a reed valve. A similar effect is also used in the exhaust system of most two-stroke engines, using a reflected pressure pulse to supercharge the cylinder.

During the early 2010s, some Formula 1 teams used Helmholtz resonators in their cars' exhaust systems to help even out the flow of gasses that were being used to seal the edges of their diffusers as part of their exhaust blown diffuser systems.

=== Aircraft ===
Helmholtz resonators are also used to build acoustic liners for reducing the noise of aircraft engines, for example. These acoustic liners are made of two components:

- a simple sheet of metal (or other material) perforated with little holes spaced out in a regular or irregular pattern; this is called a resistive sheet;
- a series of so-called honeycomb cavities (holes with a honeycomb shape, but in fact only their volume matters).

Such acoustic liners are used in most of today's aircraft engines. The perforated sheet is usually visible from inside or outside the airplane; the honeycomb is just under it. The thickness of the perforated sheet is of importance, as shown above. Sometimes there are two layers of liners; they are then called "2-DOF liners" (DOF meaning degrees of freedom), as opposed to "single DOF liners".

This effect might also be used to reduce skin friction drag on aircraft wings by 20%.

=== Architecture ===
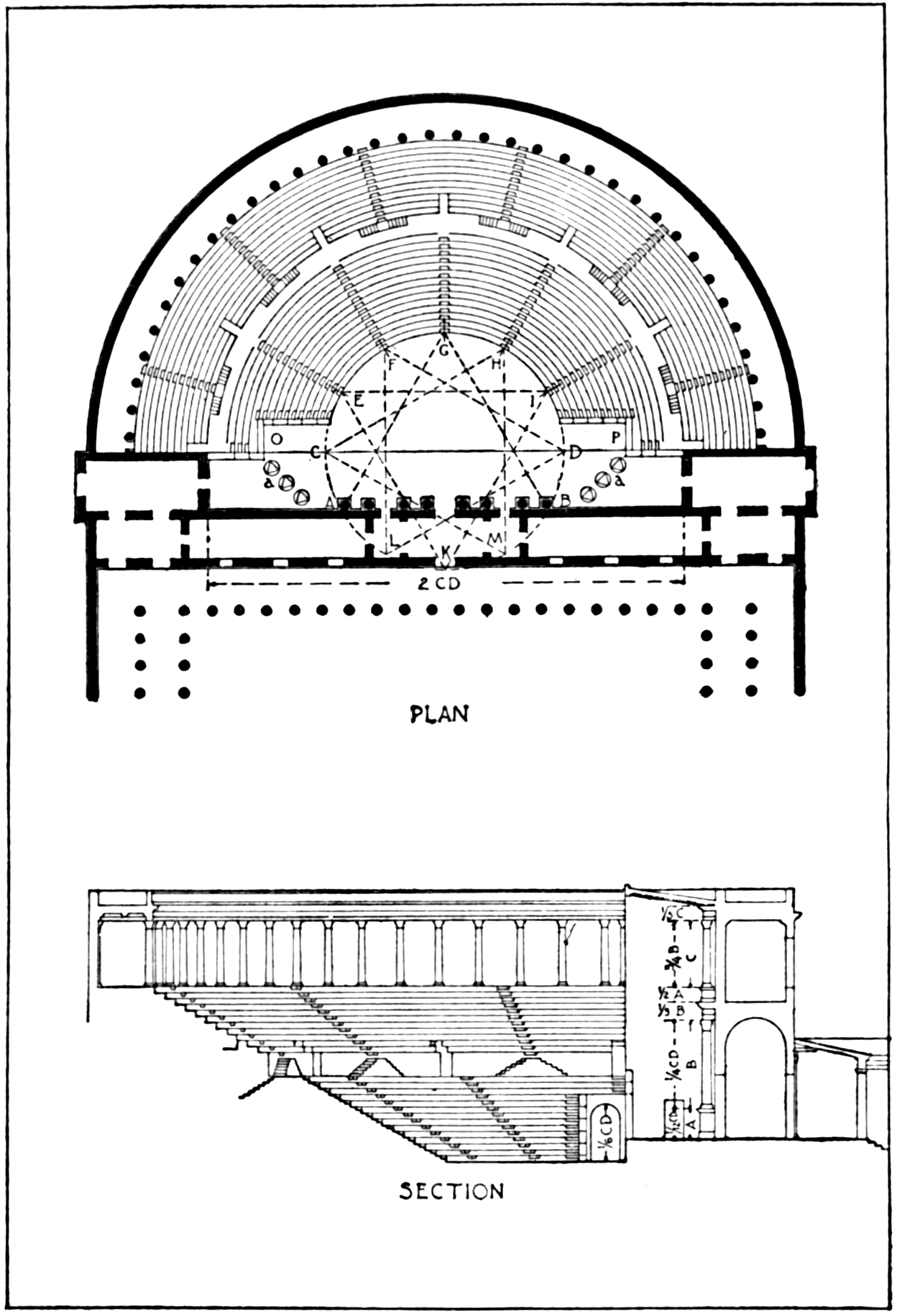
The Roman Theatre according to Vitruvius, from Wikisource:Ten Books on Architecture/Book V

Vitruvius, a 1st-century BC Roman architect, described the use of bronze or pottery resonators in classical theater design.

Helmholtz resonators are used in architectural acoustics to reduce undesirable low frequency sounds (standing waves, etc.) by building a resonator tuned to the problem frequency, and putting absorbing material inside, thereby reducing it.

=== Music (instruments and amplification) ===
In all stringed instruments, from the sitar to the modern guitar and violin, the response curve of the instrument consists of a series of Helmholtz resonance modes associated with the size and shape of the resonance cavity (harmonics of the fundamental cavity mode), as well as vibration damping from absorption by the resonance cavity material (typically wood). An ocarina is essentially a Helmholtz resonator where the combined area of the opened finger holes determines the note played by the instrument. The West African djembe is related to a Helmholtz resonator with a small neck area, giving it a deep bass tone, but its stretched skin, strongly coupled to the cavity makes it a more complex, and musically interesting, resonant system. It has been in use for thousands of years. Conversely, the human mouth is effectively a Helmholtz resonator when it is used in conjunction with a jaw harp, shepherd's whistle, nose whistle, nose flute. The nose blows air through an open nosepiece, into an air duct, and across an edge adjacent to the open mouth, creating the resonator. The volume and shape of the mouth cavity augments the pitch of the tone.

Helmholtz resonance is also used in bass-reflex speaker enclosures, with the compliance of the air mass inside the enclosure and the mass of air in the port forming a Helmholtz resonator. By tuning the resonant frequency of the Helmholtz resonator to the lower end of the loudspeaker's usable frequency range, the speaker's low-frequency performance is improved.

=== Other ===
Helmholtz resonance is one of the principles behind the way piezoelectric buzzers work: a piezoelectric disc acts as the excitation source, but it relies on the acoustic cavity resonance to produce an audible sound.

== See also ==
- Acoustic resonance § Resonance of a sphere of air (vented) for more detailed acoustics (physics perspective)
- Vessel flute for more detailed acoustics (musical perspective)
- Xun (instrument), an instrument that is a Helmholtz resonator with holes
- Resonance
