= A Day Out of Time =

Live album by Trance Mission
- Released: April 6, 1999
- Recorded: July 25, 1998, at St. John's Church, Berkeley, CA
- Genre: Ambient
- Length: 69:17
- Label: City of Tribes
- Producer: Simon Tassano, Trance Mission

Trance Mission chronology
Head Light (1996)	A Day Out of Time (1999)

Professional ratings
Review scores
Source	Rating
Allmusic	4/5 stars
Exclaim!	(favorable)

A Day Out of Time is a live album by Trance Mission, released on April 6, 1999, through City of Tribes Records.

== Track listing ==
No.	Title	Music	Length
1.	"Head Light" (part 1)	Custer, Kent	7:06
2.	"Head Light" (part 2)	Custer, Kent	4:06
3.	"Working Wheel"	Kent, Maxym	4:38
4.	"Tjilpi II"	Kent	5:54
5.	"Curious Wine"	Custer, Dickinson, Kent, Maxym, Valsamis	5:54
6.	"Space"	Custer, Kent, Maxym, Valsamis	2:43
7.	"Chasing the Moon Rabbit"	Custer, Kent	4:10
8.	"Secret Void"	Custer, Kent, Maxym, Valsamis	11:04
9.	"Monkfish"	Custer, Kent	5:50
10.	"Go Play Outside!"	Custer, Kent, Maxym, Tassano	7:10
11.	"Tunnels" (part 1)	Custer, Kent, Loose, Newby	5:08
12.	"Tunnels" (part 2)	Custer, Kent, Loose, Newby	5:33

== Personnel ==
Trance Mission

- Beth Custer – clarinets, trumpet, melodica, ocarina, shaker, tingsha, voice
- Stephen Kent – didgeridoo, cello, ngoma, percussion, voice
- Eda Maxym – kalimba, keyboards, shaker, voice
- Peter Valsamis – drums, djembe, dumbek, gong, percussion

Production and additional personnel

- Anne Hamersky – photography
- Mark Stichman – engineering
- Simon Tassano – production, mixing
- Trance Mission – production
