= Oterfløyte =

Norwegian flute

- Classification: Wind, Aerophone

Related instruments
- Ocarina, Xun, Tin Whistle, Recorder, Western concert flute, Flute, Ney, Kaval, Shakuhachi, Nose flute

Oterfløyte (English: "otter pipe or flute", or oterlokkefløyte English: "otter lur[e] flute") is a Norwegian flute used to mimic otter sound to serve as a lure. It is made of the wing bones of large birds, with a sound hole in the center column formed of resin or wax.
