= Halcyon Days (Steve Roach, Stephen Kent and Kenneth Newby album) =

Studio album by Steve Roach, Stephen Kent and Kenneth Newby
- Released: 1996
- Recorded: December 17–28, 1995 at The Timeroom in Tucson, Arizona
- Genre: Ambient, world fusion, space music
- Length: 63:20
- Label: Fathom
- Producer: Steve Roach, Stephen Kent and Kenneth Newby

Steve Roach chronology
| The Magnificent Void (1996) | Halcyon Days (1996) | Cavern of Sirens (1997) |

Stephen Kent chronology
| Landing (1994) | Halcyon Days (1996) | Family Tree (1997) |

Kenneth Newby chronology
| Ecology of Souls (1994) | Halcyon Days (1996) | Sirens (1997) |

Professional ratings
Review scores
| Source | Rating |
|---|---|
| Allmusic | 4/5 stars |
| Alternate Music Press | favorable |

Halcyon Days is a collaborative album by the ambient musicians Steve Roach, Stephen Kent and Kenneth Newby. This album was recorded in the period from December 17 to 28, 1995. At that time most of the United States were experiencing severe winter weather, but the Sonoran Desert region, where this album was recorded, was enjoying a period temperate calm and clear skies.

While recording this album, Kent and Newby, along with their families, stayed at Roach's home in Tucson. While there, the group enjoyed casual walks through the surrounding desert, serving as inspiration for their daily creative explorations in the studio.

Halcyon is the ancient Greek name for a bird now believed to be the kingfisher. In Greek Mythology Alcyone was a queen whose husband Ceyx was killed when his ship was lost at sea. She was overcome by grief and tried to drown herself, but the gods took pity on her and transformed her into a kingfisher. In the myth, the seas are calmed during a two-week period surrounding the winter solstice, when Alcyon's descendants lay their eggs on the still water. This period is known as the Halcyon Days.

The music has a predominantly acoustic quality although much of the percussion and textures are rendered by computer algorithms designed by Kenneth Newby (Halcyon Days, Calyx Revelation, Rainfrog Dreaming) or programmed by Steve Roach (First Day, Kingfisher Flight), with didgeridoo and flute. Sampled electroacoustic textures are used throughout with only limited use of synthesizers. On some tracks, Stephen Kent plays a cello, in a fashion that resembles the sintir, a Moroccan plucked stringed instrument with a sound resembling an upright bass. This gives these tracks slight jazz overtones.

== Track listing ==
1. ”Halcyon Days” (10:20)
2. ”First Day” (9:22)
3. ”Rainfrog Dreaming” (7:56)
4. ”Snake Brothers” (5:52)
5. ”Slow Walk at Stone Wash” (9:22)
6. ”Riding the Atlas” (5:28)
7. ”Calyx Revelation” (8:00)
8. ”Kingfisher Flight” (7:00)

== Personnel ==
- Steve Roach (analog and digital synthesizers, percussion, ocarinas, didgeridoo on “Snake Brothers” and “Riding the Atlas”)
- Stephen Kent (didgeridoos, percussion, cello, ocarinas)
- Kenneth Newby (treatments, samplers, algorithmic drummers and atmospheres, suling, percussion, p’iri, bonang)

== See also ==
- Ambient music
- Electronic music
