= Head Light =

Studio album by Trance Mission
- Released: October 21, 1996
- Recorded: Mobius Music, San Francisco, California
- Genre: Ambient
- Length: 51:14
- Label: City of Tribes
- Producer: Simon Tassano

Trance Mission chronology
Meanwhile... (1995)	Head Light (1996)	A Day Out of Time (1999)

Professional ratings
Review scores
Source	Rating
Allmusic	2.5/5 stars
Alternative Press	4/5 stars

Head Light is the third album by Trance Mission, released on October 21, 1996 through City of Tribes Records.

== Track listing ==
All music is composed by Trance Mission.

No.	Title	Length
1.	"Monkfish"	5:07
2.	"Head Light"	10:32
3.	"Alpha Swim"	5:31
4.	"Work Song"	5:37
5.	"In Frog Pyjamas"	5:50
6.	"The Sun Cries, Pt. 1"	6:45
7.	"The Sun Cries, Pt. 2"	3:35
8.	"Their Hands Are Blue"	9:47
9.	"[untitled]"	4:34

== Personnel ==
Trance Mission

- Beth Custer – alto clarinet, bass clarinet, trumpet, ocarina, txistu, percussion, bells, voice
- Stephen Kent – didgeridoo, cello, drums, percussion, shaker
- John Loose – drums, dumbek, tabla, piano, sampler, shaker
- Kenneth Newby – sampler, suling, drums, percussion

Production and additional personnel

- Ken Adams – cover art
- Anne Hamersky – photography
- Mike Johnson – mixing
- Christian Jones – recording
- Georgia Rucker – design
- Simon Tassano – production, mixing
