= Head light =

Head light may refer to:

- Head Light, 1996 album by Trance Mission
- Headlight, a lamp attached to the front of a vehicle
