= Sirens (Kenneth Newby album) =

Studio album by Kenneth Newby
- Released: April 29, 1997
- Recorded: Vibrant Arts! Laboratory, San Francisco, California
- Genre: Ambient
- Length: 50:47
- Label: City of Tribes
- Producer: Kenneth Newby

Kenneth Newby chronology
Halcyon Days (1996)	Sirens (1997)

Professional ratings
Review scores
Source	Rating
Allmusic	4/5 stars

Sirens is the second album by Kenneth Newby, released on April 29, 1997 through City of Tribes Records.

== Track listing ==
All music is composed by Kenneth Newby, except "Fathom" by Nartosabdha

No.	Title	Length
1.	"Saraswati"	4:46
2.	"Sirens I"	6:44
3.	"Luna"	1:12
4.	"Howe Sound"	6:19
5.	"Fathom"	9:31
6.	"Eileithyia"	8:12
7.	"Sirens II"	7:53
8.	"Infinite"	2:12
9.	"Mistress"	3:58

== Personnel ==
Musicians

- DB Boyko – voice on "Sirens I" and "Sirens II"
- Patti Clemens – voice on "Saraswati", "Sirens I", "Fathom", "Infinite" and "Mistress"
- Barbara Imhoff – harp "Fathom" and "Infinite"
- Stephen Kent – didgeridoo on "Eileithyia"
- Eda Maxym – voice on "Sirens II"
- Chris Miller – rebab on "Sirens I" and "Sirens II"
- Kenneth Newby – suling gambuh, piri, percussion, production, mixing, recording, design
- Alex Stahl – double bass on "Howe Sound"
- Anis W.A. Sutrisno – voice on "Fathom"
- Sutrisno – voice on "Mistress"

Production and additional personnel

- Christian Jones – recording
- M4 Media – design
- Lorraine Thomson – cover art, design
