= Trance Mission (Trance Mission album) =

Studio album by Trance Mission
- Released: 1993
- Recorded: December 1992 at Mobius Music, San Francisco, California
- Genre: Ambient
- Length: 59:21
- Label: City of Tribes
- Producer: Oliver DiCicco

Trance Mission chronology
Trance Mission (1993)	Meanwhile... (1995)

Professional ratings
Review scores
Source	Rating
Allmusic	4.5/5 stars

Trance Mission is the debut album of Trance Mission, released in 1993 through City of Tribes Records.

== Track listing ==
All music is composed by Trance Mission.

No.	Title	Length
1.	"Bo Didgeley"	4:12
2.	"Folk Song"	4:24
3.	"Tunnels"	11:04
4.	"Rig"	6:14
5.	"Tjilpi II"	5:24
6.	"VeeDeeVu"	6:30
7.	"Kif"	5:47
8.	"Red Man"	4:54
9.	"Icaro"	9:52

== Personnel ==
Trance Mission

- Beth Custer – alto clarinet, bass clarinet, horns, gong, percussion, voice
- Stephen Kent – didgeridoo, horns, surdo, shaker, percussion, voice
- John Loose – tar, bodhrán, tabla, sampler, kalimba, kanjira, Riq, percussion, voice
- Kenneth Newby – suling, piri, khene, gong, sampler, horns, percussion

Production and additional personnel

- Will Bernard – guitar on "Tunnels" and "Rig"
- Oliver DiCicco – production, engineering
- Randall Erkelens – design
- Eda Maxym – voice on "Red Man" and "Icaro"
- Charles Rose – cover art
- Jai Uttal – gub-gubbi and khartal on "Folk Song", dutar on "Red Man"
