= Ecology of Souls =

Studio album by Kenneth Newby
- Released: 1993
- Recorded: Electronic Music Facilities of the School for Contemporary Arts, Simon Fraser University, British Columbia, Canada
- Genre: Ambient
- Length: 58:07
- Label: Songlines
- Producer: Kenneth Newby, Tony Reif

Kenneth Newby chronology
Ecology of Souls (1993)	Halcyon Days (1996)

Professional ratings
Review scores
Source	Rating
Allmusic	4/5 stars

Ecology of Souls is the debut album of Kenneth Newby, released in 1993 through Songlines Recordings.

== Track listing ==
All music is composed by Kenneth Newby

No.	Title	Length
1.	"Persephone"	17:10
2.	"Equinox"	11:43
3.	"Ephemera"	12:31
4.	"Odalan"	12:01
5.	"Glossolalia" (Persephone Return)	4:18

== Personnel ==
- Janet Brook – voice
- Ann Hepper – percussion
- Andreas Kahre – percussion, voice
- Chris Miller – percussion, prepared piano
- Kenneth Newby – suling gambuh, siter, cymbal, production, mixing, recording
- Michael O'Neill – percussion
- Tony Reif – production
- Matt Rogalsky – percussion
- Lorraine Thomson – cover art
