= Giuseppe Donati =

Italian musical instrument maker (1836–1925)

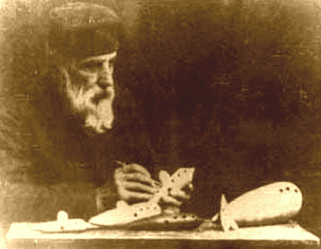
Giuseppe Donati

Giuseppe Donati (2 December 1836 – 14 February 1925) was an Italian musical instrument maker who invented the ocarina, a ceramic wind instrument based on the principle of a Helmholtz resonator.

Donati was born in Budrio. Legend has it that he created his first "little goose" ("ocarina" in Italian dialect) in 1853, aged 17, whilst still working as a brickmaker. His first ocarina-making workshop was in his hometown of Budrio. When he moved to larger premises in Bologna in 1878, a fellow musician of the Gruppo Ocarinistico, Cesare Vicinelli, continued the Budrio workshop. Donati died, aged 88, in Milan.
