= Meanwhile... =

Studio album by Trance Mission
- Released: 1995
- Recorded: Mobius Music, San Francisco, California
- Genre: Ambient
- Length: 61:01
- Label: City of Tribes
- Producer: Simon Tassano

Trance Mission chronology
Trance Mission (1993)	Meanwhile... (1995)	Head Light (1996)

Professional ratings
Review scores
Source	Rating
Allmusic	4.5/5 stars

Meanwhile... is the second album by Trance Mission, released in 1995 through City of Tribes Records.

== Track listing ==
No.	Title	Music	Length
1.	"Go Play Outside!"	Anthony, Custer, Kent, Loose, Maxym, Newby, Tassano	4:12
2.	"Bindi"	Custer, Kent, Loose, Newby	4:24
3.	"Chasing the Moon Rabbit"	Custer, Kent, Loose, Newby	11:04
4.	"Every Stone's Dream"	Anthony, Custer, Kent, Loose, Maxym, Newby	6:14
5.	"Zozobra"	Custer, Kent, Loose, Newby	5:24
6.	"Sunrise"	Scanavino	6:30
7.	"No They There"	Custer, Kent, Loose, Newby	5:47
8.	"Surrender"	Custer, Kent, Loose, Newby	4:54

== Personnel ==
Trance Mission

- Beth Custer – alto clarinet, bass clarinet, soprano clarinet, trumpet, percussion, sampler, voice
- Stephen Kent – didgeridoo, tuba, cello, ashiko, shaker, cowbell, percussion, voice
- John Loose – drums, bodhrán, dumbek, kanjira, riq, shaker, sampler, kalimba
- Kenneth Newby – programming, khene, piri, suling, sampler

Production and additional personnel

- Robert Anthony – spoken word on "Go Play Outside!" and "Every Stone's Dream"
- Egon Dubois – photography
- Phillip George – cover art
- Eda Maxym – voice on "Go Play Outside!", "Every Stone's Dream" and "Sunrise"
- Bob Olhsson – mastering
- Georgia Rucker – design
- Simon Tassano – production, engineering, mixing
