= Aleksandra Dulic =

Aleksandra Dulic (born 1973 in Belgrade, Yugoslavia) is a Serbian Canadian painter, animator, media artist and scholar. Aleksandra is a professor in creative studies at the University of British Columbia (UBC), serving as director of the Centre for Culture and Technology at (UBC). She is visiting professor at the University of Arts in Belgrade. In 1998, Aleksandra received BFA from University of Arts in Belgrade, MFA from the School for the Contemporary Arts in 2000 and Ph.D. from the School of Interactive Art and Technology in 2006 from Simon Fraser University, in British Columbia, Canada.

Her art and research involve a focus on computational poetics, media performance, situated media in the creation of interactive audiovisual installations and performances. Her work is widely presented in exhibitions, festivals, conferences and television broadcasts across Europe, Asia and North America. These works include films, animated media performances, interactive computer installations; software tools for interactive animation, as well as interdisciplinary collaborations with composers and artists in various disciplines, such as music, dance, theatre, poetry, shadow play. She is active as a curator, a writer and an educator in the area of digital media.

The installation works include in a thousand drops… refracted glances, 2008 collaboration with Kenneth Newby and Martin Gotfrit and Transience, 2010/11 collaboration with Kenneth Newby.
