= Hun (instrument) =

Traditional Korean wind instrument

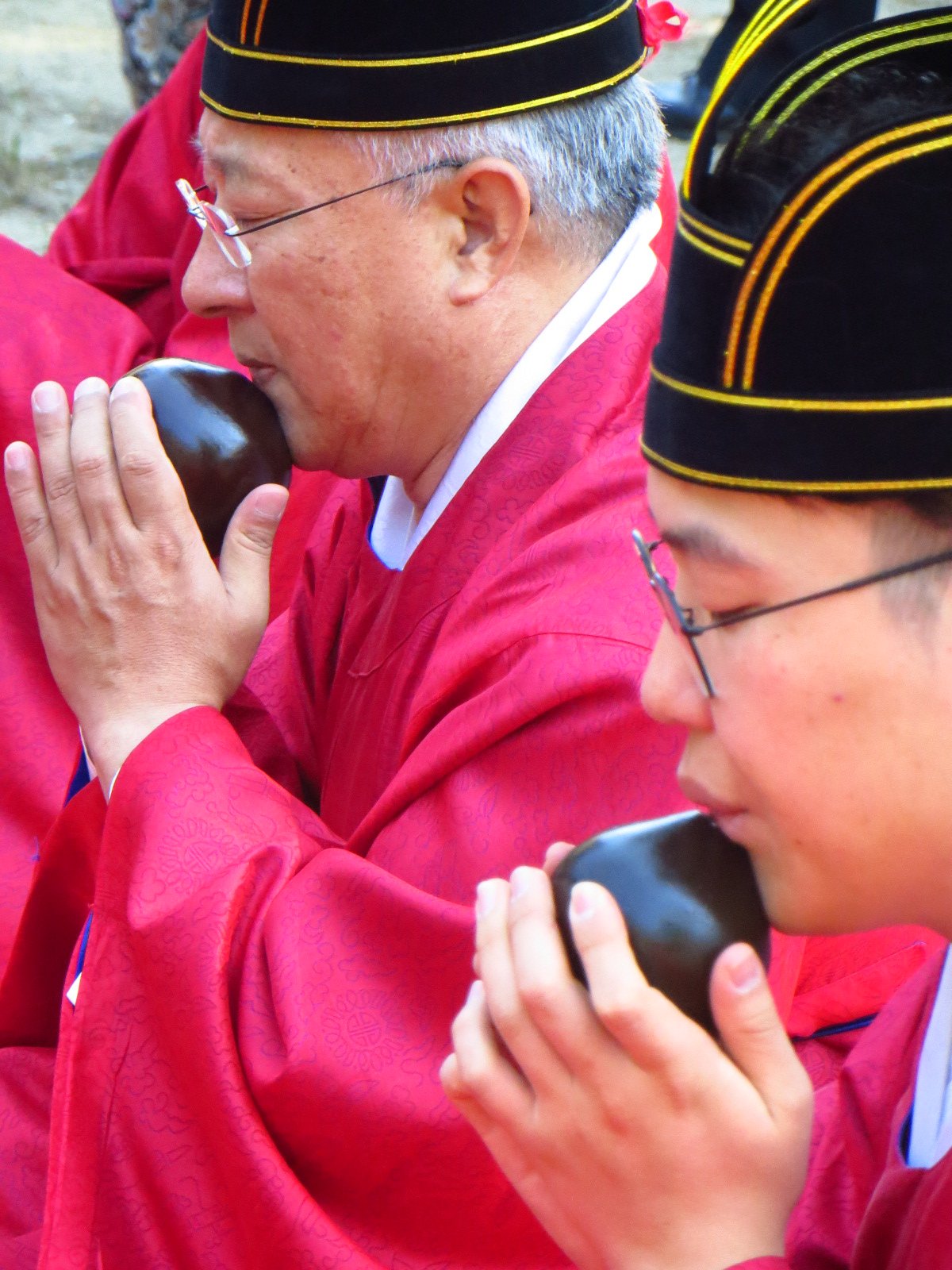
- Musicians playing the hun during a Seokjeon Daeje ceremony

Woodwind instrument
- Classification: Aerophone
- Hornbostel–Sachs classification: 421.13 (vessel flutes without distinct beak)
- Developed: 12th century

Related instruments
- Xun; Ocarina; Tsuchibue

The hun (Korean: 훈; Hanja: 塤) is a Korean Xun-like globular flute made of baked clay or other ceramics.

== Origin ==
The hun is a close relative to the Chinese xun. It dates back to the 12th century, when it was introduced to Korea by the Song dynasty of China in 1114 and 1116. This came about when the Chinese emperor gave 72 hun to King Yejong of Goryeo as a gift. The instrument began being made in Korea around the 15th century.

== Design ==
The instrument is made of clay and is usually black. The hun is globular and comes in three main shapes: the egg, the hemisphere and the ball. It has a blowing hole on top and five finger holes, two on the back and three on the front. The is no standard size for the instrument. The hun is played using two hands. The range of the hun is an octave: it can produce all 12 chromatic notes. It has a dark timbre similar to the ocarina.

== Usage ==
It is used primarily in court music ensembles to play aak: ceremonial music to honour Confucius. In these ceremonies, the hun represents the earth and plays together with the ji, a flute. The hun has been used in this capacity since the 12th century. In the late 20th century some contemporary Korean composers began to use it in their compositions and film scores.

== See also ==
- Traditional music of Korea
