= Trance Mission =

Trance Mission is a world fusion ensemble co-founded in San Francisco by American clarinetist and composer Beth Custer and British-born didgeridoo player Stephen Kent in 1992, with Canadian musician Kenneth Newby and American percussionist John Loose. Their music incorporates elements of jazz, fourth world and ethnoambient music styles. In the 1990s, the group recorded four albums on the ambient label City of Tribes.

== History ==
After spending time in Africa, England, Spain, and Australia, Stephen Kent settled in San Francisco in the early 1990s after finishing a European tour with his band Lights in a Fat City. He first met Beth Custer while playing with Lights in a Fat City at a party for Mondo 2000. Custer, who had been playing with the Club Foot Orchestra ensemble, began playing with Kent on Sundays at the (now defunct) Radio Valencia cafe in San Francisco's Mission District. They soon invited percussionist John Loose of the Blue Rubies to join them. Canadian composer Kenneth Newby, who had previously played with Kent in Lights in a Fat City and had known Kent since 1985, joined the band after the trio had played only a few times together. The newly formed quartet solidified in April 1992 with a trip to the Wine Country region where they completed their first recording. These recordings were self-released on a C60 cassette by the band.

=== Trance Mission (1993) ===
Trance Mission's self-titled debut album was recorded later that year in December 1992 at Mobius Music in San Francisco. In the studio, the band recorded only live performances, with the entire session lasting just one week. Produced by Alex Stahl and Oliver di Cicco, the album was released in 1993 featuring special guests Will Bernard on guitar, Eda Maxym on vocals, Dan Reiter on cello, and Jai Uttal on dotar and kartals. Upon its release the album sold 10,000 copies with minimal marketing, and became, according to music critic Craig Harris, "a staple of college radio world music shows".

Custer's performance on the debut album earned her a nomination for "Outstanding reeds/brass player" at the 17th Annual Bay Area Music Awards (Bammies), now known as the California Music Awards. The band appeared on West Coast Live at the Cowell Theater on January 8, 1994. The host, Sedge Thomson, credits Kent for influencing his choice of iconic shoewear—red Dr. Martens.

=== Meanwhile... (1994) ===
Their second album, Meanwhile... (1994), featured special guests Robert Anthony performing spoken word, Eda Maxym on vocals, and Peter Whitehead on rebab. Billboard magazine published a critic's choice review of Meanwhile in November 1994, calling the album a "seductive world-fusion journey", with the band joining "the ranks of Jon Hassell, Steve Roach, and Robert Rich in exploring a primary, techno-tribal music". Approximately a year later, Trance Mission was voted best "World Music" band at the Sixth Annual SF Weekly Music Awards.

=== Head Light (1996) ===
Head Light (1996), the band's third album, remained heavily rhythmic but more ethnoambient. Produced by Simon Tassano, the album has, notes music critic Bryan Reesman, "an equally dense and spacious feel, creating a clear mix". Writer Sam Prestianni observes that the album's "digital aura remarkably marries the indigenous instrumentation with a rare naturalness" and that it "resonates with the full flame of world-derived trance power". The album was nominated for "Outstanding World Beat Album" at the 20th annual Bay Area Music Awards. Busy with other projects and unable to tour, Loose and Newby left the band towards the end of 1996. Newby left the United States for Canada while Loose returned to working full-time for Dolby Labs.

=== A Day Out of Time (1999) ===
Vocalist and keyboard player Eda Maxym and percussionist Peter Valsamis joined the band, touring Europe multiple times. On May 30, 1998, Trance Mission played the Benefit Concert for the Refugee Children of Tibet at the Yerba Buena Center for the Arts along with Silvia Nakkach and Nina Hagen. The group played a farewell concert on July 25, 1998 at St. John's Church in Berkeley. The concert was recorded live, mixed by Simon Tassano, and released as their fourth album, A Day Out of Time (1999).

=== Recent work ===
After producing four albums and touring North America and Europe, including music festivals in Vienna, Hamburg, and Berlin, the City of Tribes label went bankrupt. The original members (Kent, Custer, Newby, Loose) reunited in 2008 for a concert at Yoshi's jazz club San Francisco. Custer has discussed the possibility of reissuing and remastering older recordings from the 1990s. Custer and Kent continue to perform live together several times a year. Another version of Trance Mission performed at the Starwood Festival in 2006, featuring Stephen Kent, Peter Valsamis, Geoffrey Gordon, Eda Maxym and cellist Rufus Cappadocia. (Kent had performed as a soloist at Starwood the previous year, opening for Brazilian percussionist Airto Moreira.)

== Band members ==
- Stephen Kent – didgeridoo, percussion, cello
- Beth Custer – clarinets, trumpet, vocals
- John Loose – multi-ethnic drums, samples
- Kenneth Newby – Asian winds, percussion, digital atmospheres
- Eda Maxym – vocals
- Peter Valsamis – drums, samples

== Discography ==
Self-released cassette

- Trance Mission (1992)

All regular albums were released on the City of Tribes Records label.

As Trance Mission

- Trance Mission (1993)
- Meanwhile... (1994)
- Head Light (1996)
- A Day Out of Time (1999)
- Le Pendu (2020)

Compilations

- The Event Horizon (1994)
- The Event Horizon (1996)
- The Event Horizon (1997)

== Videography ==
- VeeDeeVu (1994)
