= Cavern of Sirens =

Studio album by Steve Roach, Vidna Obmana
- Released: 10 June 1997
- Recorded: 1995–1996
- Genre: Ambient
- Length: 72:48
- Label: Projekt
- Producer: Steve Roach, Vidna Obmana

Steve Roach chronology
Halcyon Days (1996)	Cavern of Sirens (1997)	On This Planet (1997)

Professional ratings
Review scores
Source	Rating
Allmusic	4/5 stars

Cavern of Sirens is the second collaborative album by the American ambient musicians Steve Roach and Vidna Obmana.

== Reception ==
AllMusic rated the album a 4 of 5, stating "this CD is essential".

== Track listing ==
No.	Title	Length
1.	"Ascension for Protection"	11:27
2.	"Hidden Earth and the Shadows Dance"	15:17
3.	"Middle World Passage"	24:18
4.	"The Current Below"	9:19
5.	"The Graceful Sky"	12:27

== Personnel ==
- Steve Roach, Vidna Obmana – composer, performer, producer, recorder
- Sam Rosenthal – design
- Roger King – mastering
- Martine Verhoeven – cover photography
- Vidna Obmana – recorder
- Steve Roach – recorder, mixing

== Notes ==
- Source material recorded at Serenity Studio, Belgium and the Timeroom, Tucson, Arizona between 1995 and 1996.
- Final performance and recording at the Timeroom in October 1996, mixed November 1996.
- Thupten Nyandak, Pema Lama and director of the Dip Tse-Chok-Ling Monastery, Dharamsala, India.
- Tibetan Buddhist Chant on "Ascension For Protection" recorded at the Timeroom in November 1995.
