= Molinukai =

Lithuanian folk music instrument

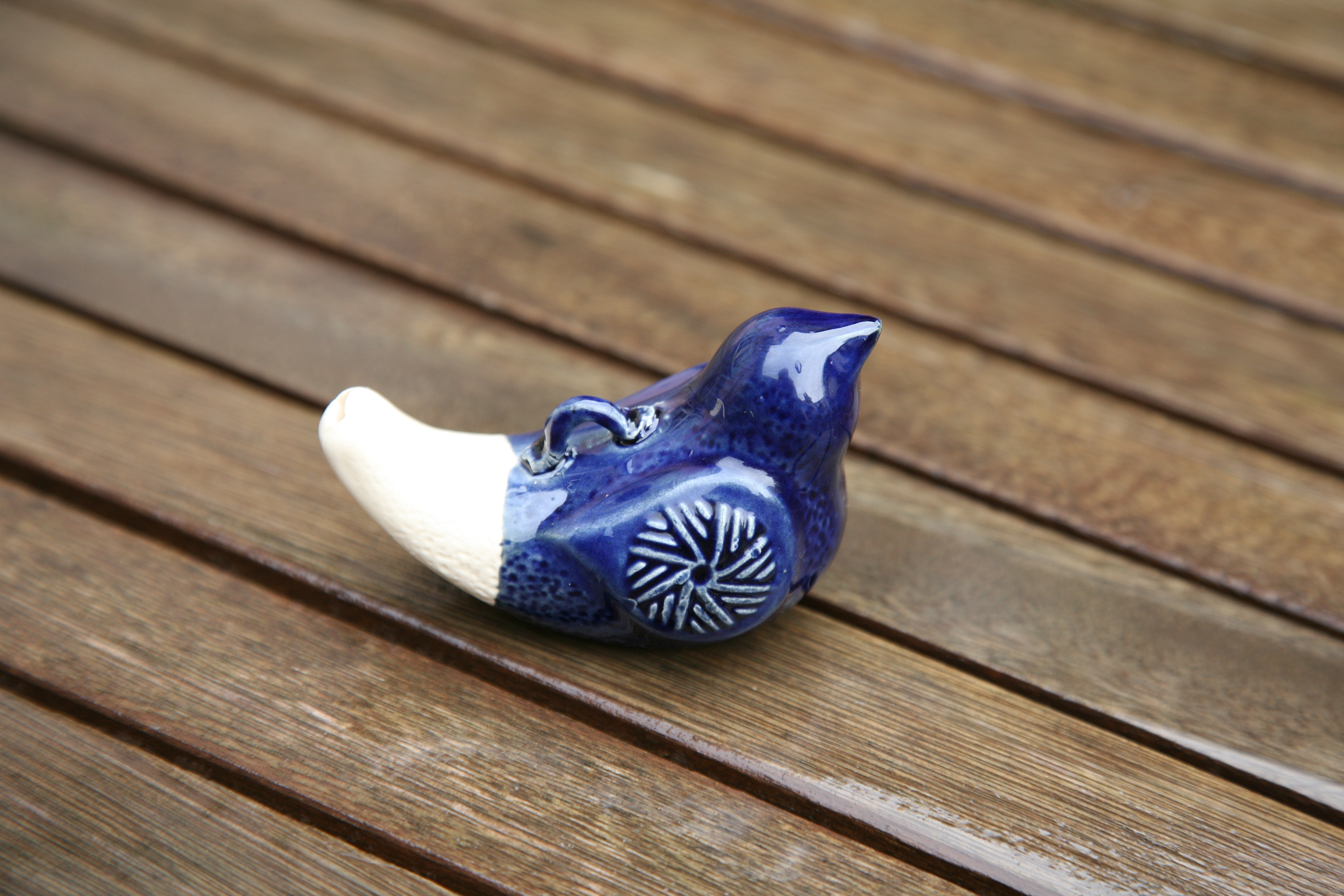
Clay pipe or duck pipe or clay pipe, in the art of Lithuanian ceramists, Estonian folk instrument

Molinukai are Lithuanian ocarinas, made in the shape of a tube or a toy figure. The tube-shaped whistles are made of clay mixed with sand. The clay is kneaded and rolled, and rolled around a small stick. The stick is removed, one end of the tube is squeezed shut, while the other end is flattened and the blowing hole is made with a thin splinter. A whistle hole and two to four finger holes are made in the top. Toy shapes are made in the same way as tubes, but the hollow is carved in a finished shape. The molinukai are carved and then fired in an oven. The sound of a molinukas is soft, and the timbre is delicate. Musical possibilities are determined by the number of finger holes. Melodies are improvised. At times, sutartinės were played with these whistles. The molinukai were toys used by herders and children.

== Sources ==
- Liucija Vaidachovičiūtė (2021-05-04). "lithuanian traditional instruments". prezi.com.
