= Xun (instrument) =

Globular vessel flute from China

Woodwind instrument
- Classification: aerophone
- Hornbostel–Sachs classification: 421.221.42 (vessel flute)
- Developed: c.1600 BCE (Xia Dynasty)

Related instruments
- hun, tsuchibue

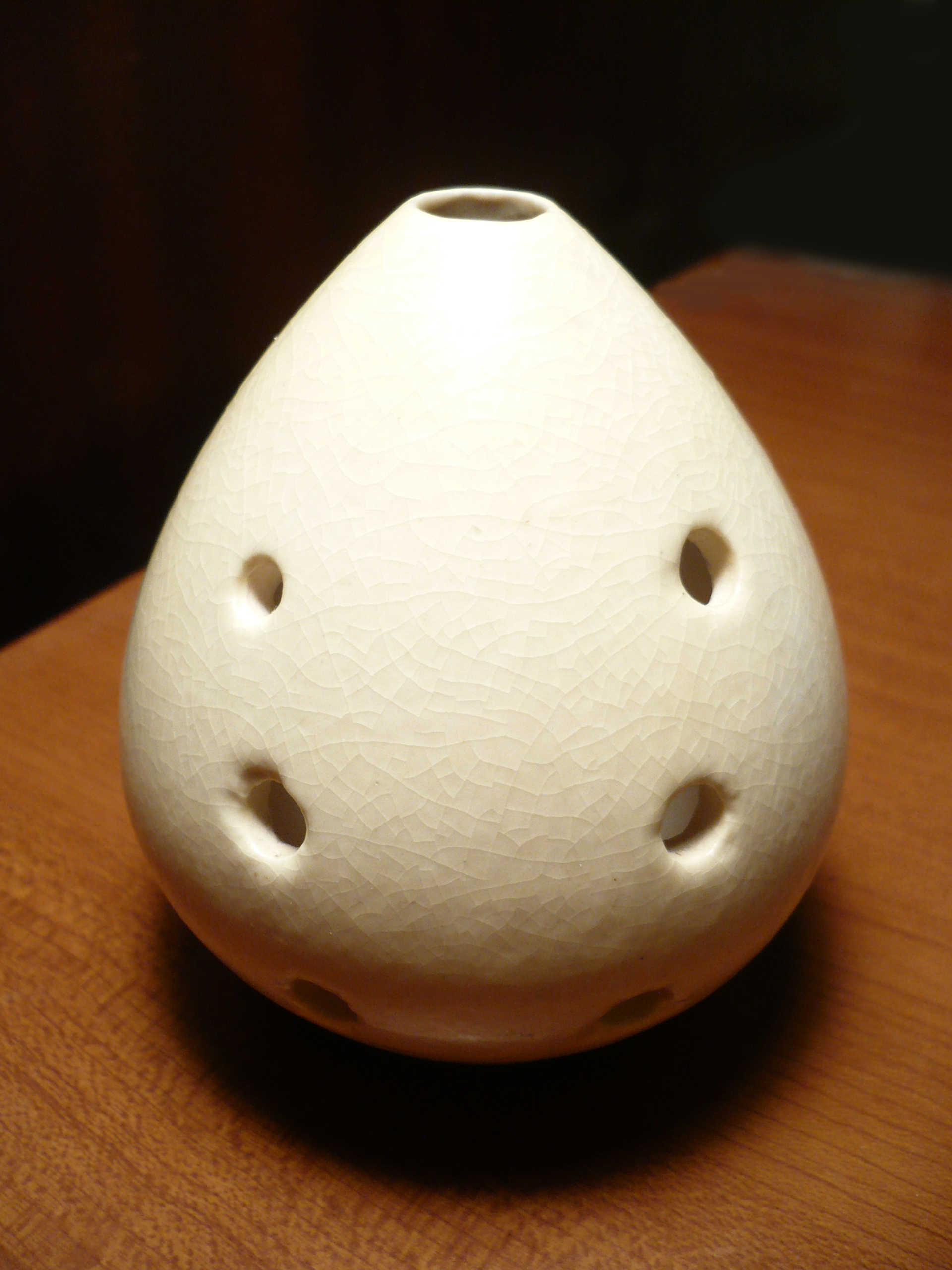
The front of a glazed pottery xun, showing blowing hole and six finger holes

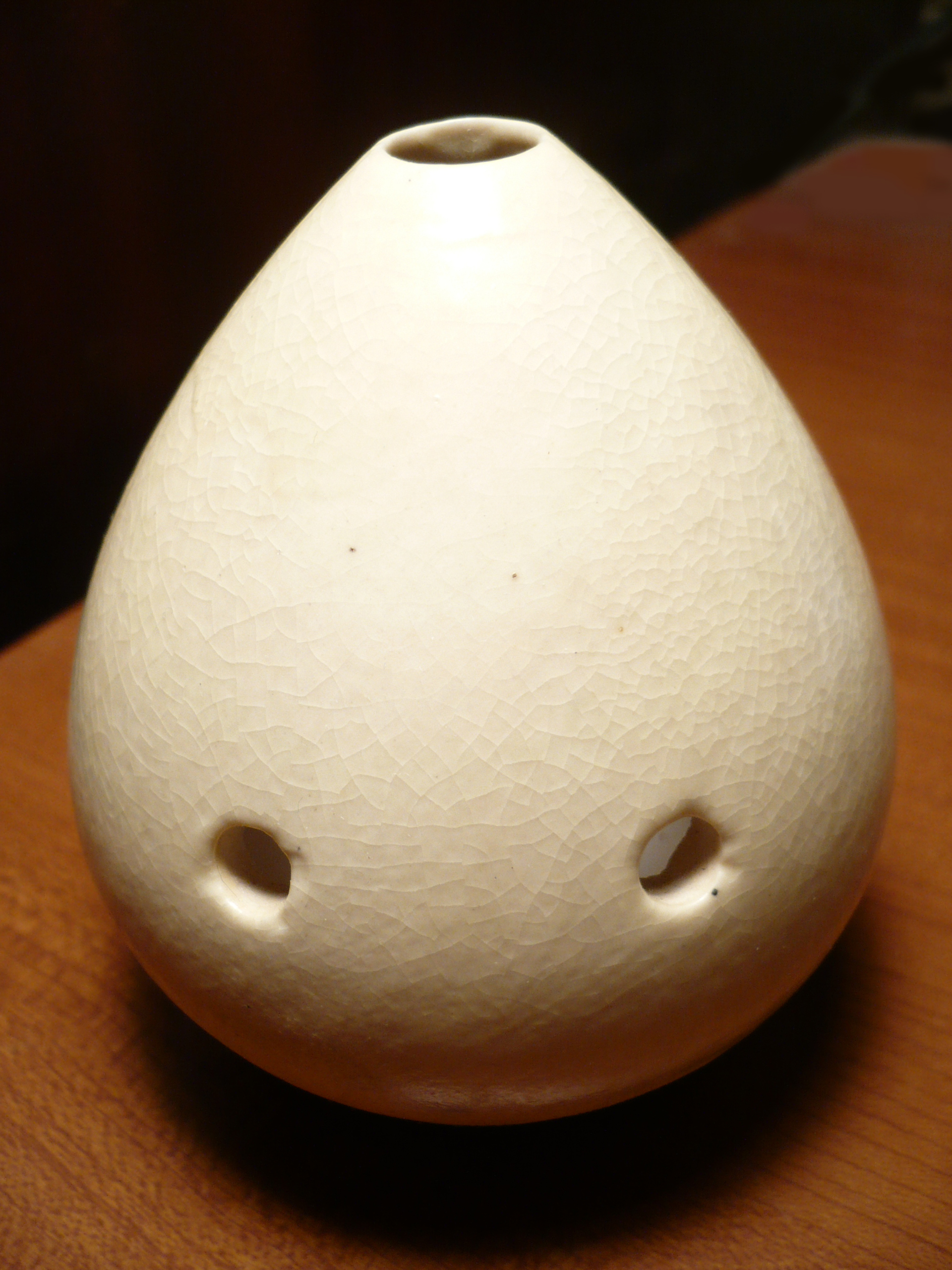
The back of a glazed pottery xun, showing blowing hole and two thumb holes

The xun (simplified Chinese: 埙; traditional Chinese: 塤; pinyin: xūn; Jyutping: hyun1) is a globular, vessel flute from China. It is one of the oldest musical instruments in China and has been in use for approximately 7,000 years. The xun was initially made of stone, baked clay, or bone, and later of clay or ceramic; sometimes the instrument is made with bamboo. It is the only surviving example of an earth (also called "clay") instrument from the traditional "eight-tone" (bayin) classifications of musical instruments (based on whether the instrument is made from metal, stone, silk, bamboo, gourd, earth, hide, or wood).

== Components ==
The xun is an egg-shaped aerophone, containing at least three finger holes in front and two thumb holes in back. It has a blowing hole on top and can have up to ten smaller finger holes, one for each finger. It is similar to an ocarina but does not contain a fipple mouthpiece, unlike other Chinese flute-like instruments, such as the Wudu and Taodi. The xun can come in a variety of sizes.

The entry for the Xun in the oldest surviving Chinese encyclopedia, Erya (Refined Definitions, c. 3rd century BC), describes it as being of two types:

1. large, shaped like a goose egg, with flattened bottom and six holes (lower pitch);
2. small, shaped like a chicken egg (higher pitch).

== History and development ==
The origin of this unique wind instrument dates back to the Stone Age and has much to do with early Chinese hunting practices. During ancient times, people often tied a stone or mud ball to the rope that was used for hunting wild animals. Some of the balls were hollow, which allowed it to make many sounds when thrown. Most people found it enjoyable and learned how to blow air into it. Gradually, the "stone meteor" became the musical instrument we know as "xun".

Archaeologists have discovered vessel-flutes like the xun in common graves of the Xia dynasty. Those had three finger holes and could produce the notes do, mi, so, la and fa. The shape of the instrument and number of finger holes of the xun as we know it today were standardized during the Shang dynasty. Most xun of that era had five finger holes and produced sound of much better quality. They were able to produce all the tones and half-tones in a single octave.

By the Zhou dynasty, it was a common instrument and was played in the imperial courts. The design of the xun varied according to whether it was played for enjoyment or for celebrations.

== Cultural significance ==
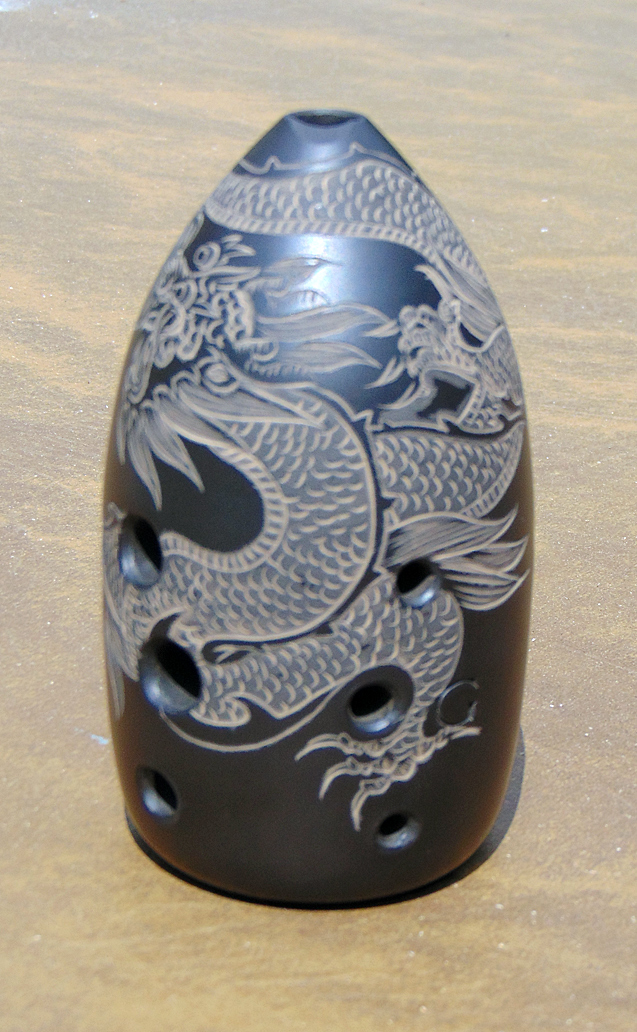
A modern ceramic xun decorated with an engraving of a dragon.

The use of xun in the Chinese history was found mainly in the performance of palace music. However, the sound of xun is also associated as the symbol of respectable hermits, lady in sorrow, or heroes at the end of their strength, and is considered the best instrument to perform a heartbreaking tone, or to make solemn music within the royal court. The sound of xun represents a particular beauty, which combines with loneliness, desolate and elegance. It is the embodiment of the unique Chinese aesthetic conceptions. In a traditional Chinese orchestra, xun plays the important part of alto voice. Its soft, heavy voice makes high-pitch and low-pitch in a harmonious proportion. In this sense, xun represents also the idea of harmony, which is one of the main parts of traditional Chinese values.

== In literature ==
Erya (爾雅): "A large xun is like a goose egg, with a flattened bottom and six holes; a small one is like a chicken egg"

Classic of Poetry (詩經): "The elder brother plays xun, the younger brother plays chi [transverse flute]"

== See also ==
- Ocarina
- Chinese flutes
- Traditional Chinese musical instruments
- Music of China
