= Kenneth Newby =

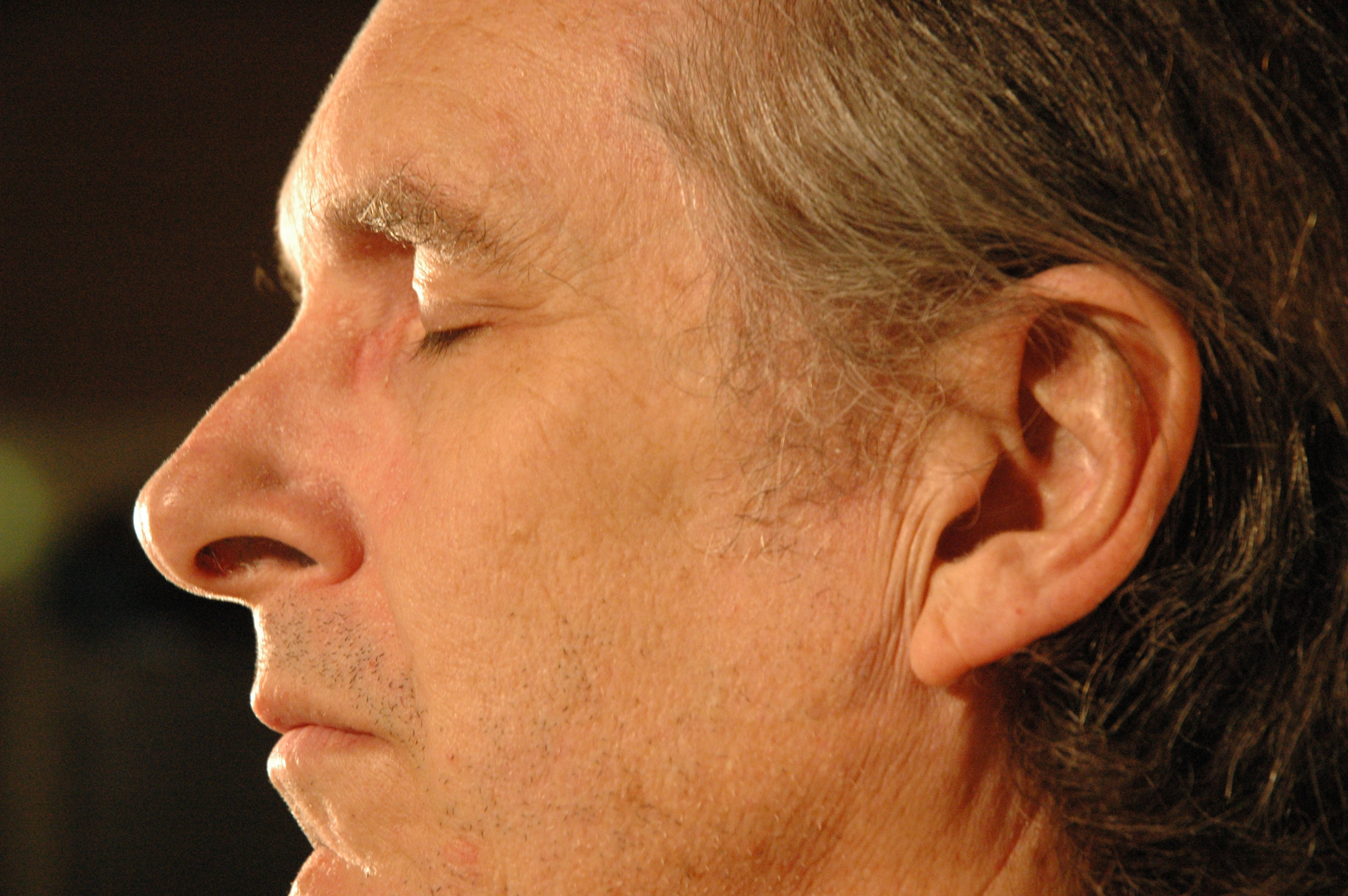
- Newby 2007

Background information
- Born: Kenneth Clayton Newby; 29 September 1956 (age 69); Victoria, British Columbia Canada
- Genres: Contemporary Classical; Spectral music; experimental
- Occupations: Composer; musician; media artist; software designer; animator; sound designer; educator; scholar
- Labels: Songlines; Fathom; Extreme; City of Tribes; Flicker Art Collaboratory
- Website: kennethnewby.net

Kenneth Newby (born 1956) is a Canadian media artist, composer-performer, educator, interaction designer, and audio producer based in British Columbia. He is known for his innovative use of technology in the creation of music, media performances, and installations. He is a research associate at the Center for Culture and Technology at the University of British Columbia, and Director of the Flicker Art Collaboratory.

== Early life ==
Newby was born in Victoria, British Columbia.

== Career ==
Newby joined the research faculty in media arts at Simon Fraser University, where he was a member of the Computational Poetics research group with Aleksandra Dulic and Martin Gotfrit. At the University of the Fraser Valley he was associate professor in media arts, where he studied creative forces in the field of computational art.

Newby created performances and exhibits which integrated new media diffusion techniques and augmented reality systems, and he developed generative systems for the composition and performance of music and visual art.

In the 1990s Newby released several solo albums, including Ecology of Souls in 1993. He also collaborated on recordings with the groups Trance Mission and Lights in a Fat City.

In 2004 Newby collaborated with the group Gamelan Madu Sari on their album of Javanese music, New Nectar, and later contributed to their live performance installation, "Semar's Journey", in Vancouver.

Newby also worked as an interactivity consultant for Pixar Animation Studios, and as a sound artist and audio software developer at Electronic Arts.

== Discography ==
Solo

Year	Name	Ref
1993	Ecology of Souls	
1997/2017	Sirens	
1998/2017	Seasonal Round (an opera with libretto and vocal performance by Robert Anthony)	
2017	Chambers – Emergence Trilogy volume one	
2017	Elegeia – Emergence Trilogy volume two	
2017	spectral (golden) lyric – Emergence Trilogy volume three	
2025	From Emergence	
2025	From Solitude: music for spectral orchestra	

Trance Mission

Year	Name	Ref
1993	Trance Mission	
1995	Meanwhile...	
1996	Head Light	

Lights in a Fat City

Year	Name	Ref
1993	Sound Column	
1999	Memory Ground	

Other appearances

Year	Name	Artist	Ref
1994	Landing	Stephen Kent	
1995	The Shirt I Slept In	Beth Custer	
1996	Halcyon Days	w/ Steve Roach & Stephen Kent	
