= Rufus Cappadocia =

Canadian-American cellist

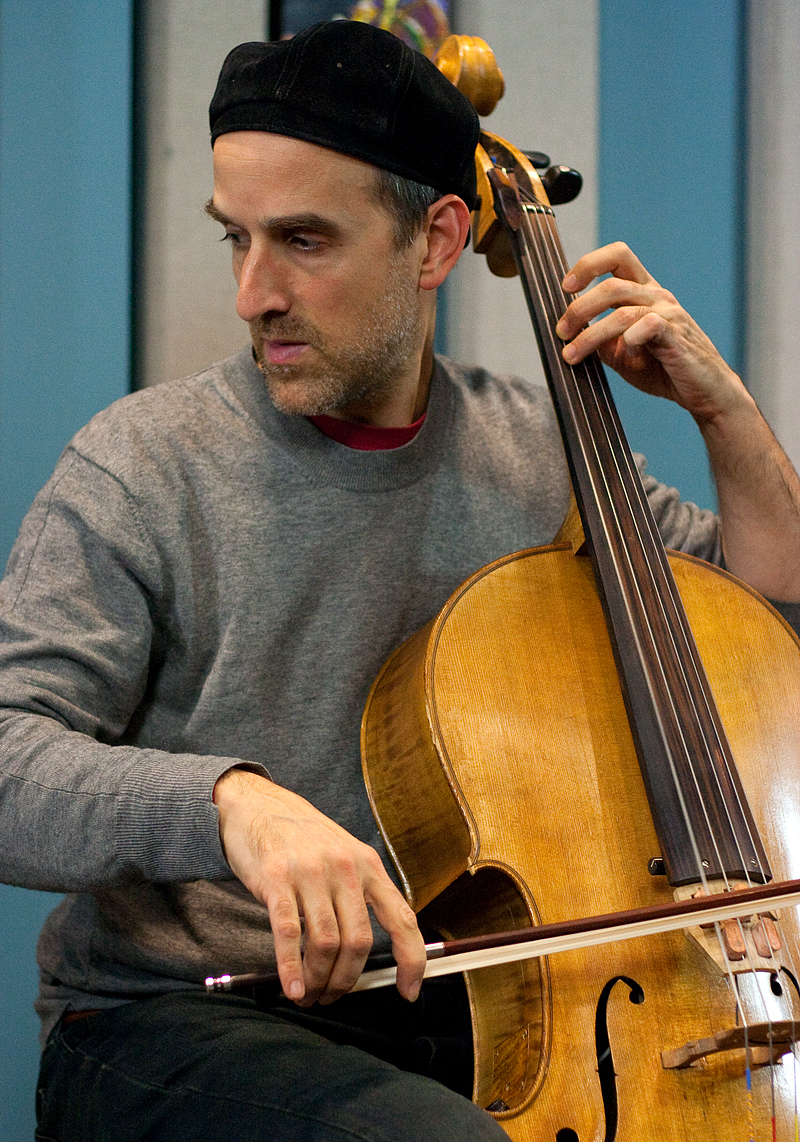
- Cappadocia playing at the KPLU studios November 2010

Background information
- Born: Hamilton, Ontario, Canada
- Instruments: 5 String Cello, rebab, goge, gerhu, guitarcello
- Website: rufusmusic.com

Rufus Cappadocia is a Canadian-American cellist best known for his cross-cultural recordings and performances. He has released albums in collaboration with guitarist David Fiuczynski, singer Bethany Yarrow, Stellamara with Sonja Drakulich, multi-instrumentalist Ross Daly and The Paradox Trio with Matt Dariau.

== Biography ==
Cappadocia was born and raised in Hamilton, Ontario. He began playing cello at the age of 3. Cappadocia went on to study classically at McGill University in Montreal, where he spent much of his spare time studying sounds and music from lesser-known musical traditions in the university's ethno-musicology department. He left school, and traveled to the south of France and to Spain, where he played as a street musician. In his travels, be continued to pick up new sounds and ethnic styles, which he blended into his own.

Partly to improve his ability to compete with other street musicians, Cappadocia decided to "add a bass register" to his cello. He left Europe, and is now based in New York. His musical style blends "the similarities between seemingly diverse music forms such as blues, Sufi, Middle Eastern and even Gregorian chant. To him they are all compatible, microtonal modes of music."

Cappadocia's past collaborations have included participation in the jazz group The Paradox Trio and the World Music group Trance Mission. He has also produced CDs with guitarist David Fiuczynski and singer/songwriter Bethany Yarrow.

== Discography ==
=== Rufus Cappadocia and David Fiuczynski ===
Year	Title	Label	Tracks played
2003	Kif	Fuzelicious Records	"Chinese GoGo"

=== Rufus and Bethany ===
Year	Title	Label	Tracks played
2007	900 Miles	HYENA Records	"900 Miles", "St. James Infirmary," "East Virginia" and "Linin' Track"

=== Solo releases ===
Year	Title	Label
2008	Songs for Cello	Velour Recordings
