= Stephen Kent (musician) =

Professional didgeridoo player

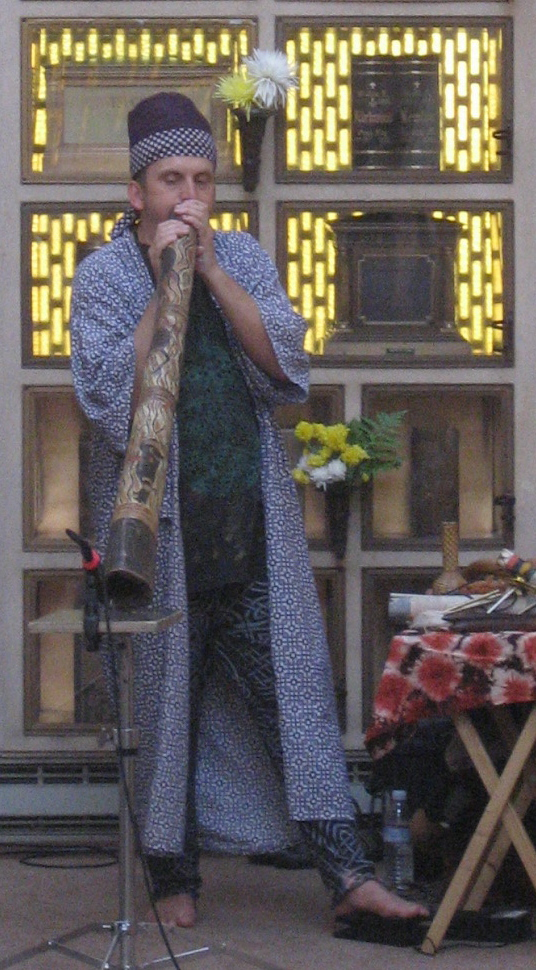
Stephen Kent performing in 2008

Stephen Kent is a professional didgeridoo performer, percussionist, composer and recording artist. He lives in the San Francisco Bay Area.

== Musical career ==
Forming the band Lights in a Fat City (with percussionist Eddy Sayer & producer/sound engineer Simon Tassano), he made the first contemporary releases of didjeridu music in the northern hemisphere (the landmark LP/CDs Somewhere and Sound Column on These Records, since reissued by City of Tribes) in 1988.

With the band Trance Mission, he joined the ranks of Jon Hassell, Steve Roach, and Robert Rich in exploring primal, techno-tribal music. Trance Mission was co-formed in San Francisco in 1992 by Stephen Kent (Didjeridu/Percussion), Beth Custer (Clarinets/Trumpet), John Loose (Multi-Ethnic Drums/Samples), and Kenneth Newby (Asian Winds/Digital Atmospheres), making up the quartet which produced 3 globally acclaimed CDs on the City of Tribes label over as many years in the mid-nineties. After several European tours and many live appearances on the West Coast of the US, Loose and Newby moved on to other projects while Custer and Kent continued as Trance Mission, with Eda Maxym (also of Beasts of Paradise) joining on vocals and Canadian Peter Valsamis on Drums/Samples. This version of Trance Mission produced a live CD, "A Day out of Time", in 1999. Another version of Trance Mission performed at the Starwood Festival in 2006, featuring Stephen Kent, Peter Valsamis, Geoffrey Gordon, Eda Maxym and cellist Rufus Cappadocia. (Kent had performed as a soloist at Starwood the previous year, opening for Brazilian percussionist Airto Moreira.)

In the 21st century, Stephen Kent released two more solo CDs, Oil & Water and Living Labyrinths, on his Family Tree label. Recent projects include several years of combining with Tuvan throat singing sensations, Chirgilchin as Karashay, ongoing work with Moroccan musician Yassir Chadly, performing with Malian oriented bluesman Markus James and his group the Wassonrai (who include Kamale ngoni master Mamadou Sidibe), Eda Maxym's Imagination Club, and the Del Sol String Quartet (with whom he plays the work of Australian composer Peter Sculthorpe), who recently performing at the Library of Congress in Washington DC.

His current projects include two trio groups oriented towards Indian music. One is Australian Bebop Ragas with Teed Rockwell (Chapman Stick/Fretboard Tapping Instrument) and Sameer Gupta (Tabla/Drums). The second, Baraka Moon, includes Geoffrey Gordon (Drums/Percussion) and Sukhawat Ali Khan (Vocals/Harmonium).

== Recording artist ==
Kent has released several recordings as a solo artist and appears on recordings of group projects such as Trance Mission, Beasts of Paradise, and Lights in a Fat City. He has also done session work with artists such as Airto Moreira, and Badi Assad (on her album Chameleon). He produced and performed on the album Halcyon Days (1996) together with Steve Roach and Kenneth Newby, and performed on the soundtrack of the Terence McKenna video Alien Dreamtime with Spacetime Continuum.

== Discography ==
- 1980 – Furious Pig – I Don't Like Your Face 12" EP [Rough Trade]
- 1988 – Lights in a Fat City Somewhere [These Records/City of Tribes '93]
- 1990 – Lights in a Fat City Simple Harmonic Motion (Video soundtrack. Independent)
- 1990 – Stephen Kent Ocho Elefantes [Burnt Earth Music]
- 1992 – Stephen Kent Songs From the Burnt Earth [Burnt Earth]
- 1993 – Lights in a Fat City Sound Column [Extreme]
- 1993 – Trance Mission Trance Mission [City of Tribes]
- 1994 – Spacetime Continuum, Terence McKenna & Stephen Kent Alien Dreamtime [Astralwerks]
- 1994 – Stephen Kent Landing [City of Tribes]
- 1994 – Stephen Kent/Various Artists Event Horizon [City of Tribes]
- 1994 – Trance Mission Meanwhile [City of Tribes]
- 1995 – Beasts of Paradise Nobody Knew the Time [City of Tribes]
- 1995 – Various Artists Event Horizon Psi [City of Tribes]
- 1995 – Beasts of Paradise Gathered on the Edge [City of Tribes]
- 1996 – Trance Mission Head Light [City of Tribes]
- 1996 – Stephen Kent, Steve Roach, Kenneth Newby Halcyon Days [Fathom]
- 1996 – Various Artists Event Horizon Tao [City of Tribes]
- 1997 – Stephen Kent Family Tree [Double CD – City of Tribes]
- 1998 – Badi Assad Chameleon (CD – Polygram Records)
- 1999 – Trance Mission A Day Out of Time [City of Tribes] April '99
- 1999 – Lights in a Fat City Memory Ground [City of Tibes] August '99.
- 2000 – Michel Portal, Stephen Kent, Mino Cinelu "Burundi" (Musisoft)
- 2004 – Stephen Kent Oil & Water (Family Tree)
- 2006 – Stephen Kent Live at Starwood (CD – Starwood Recordings/ACE)
- 2006 – Stephen Kent Live at Starwood (DVD – Starwood Recordings/ACE)
- 2007 – Stephen Kent Living Labyrinths (Family Tree)
- 2007 – Eda Maxym (with Stephen Kent) Imagination Club (Family Tree)
- 2014 - Sculthorpe, P.: String Quartets with Didjeridu (with Del Sol String Quartet) Dorian Sono Luminus, DSL-92181
