= Ocarina =

Wind instrument

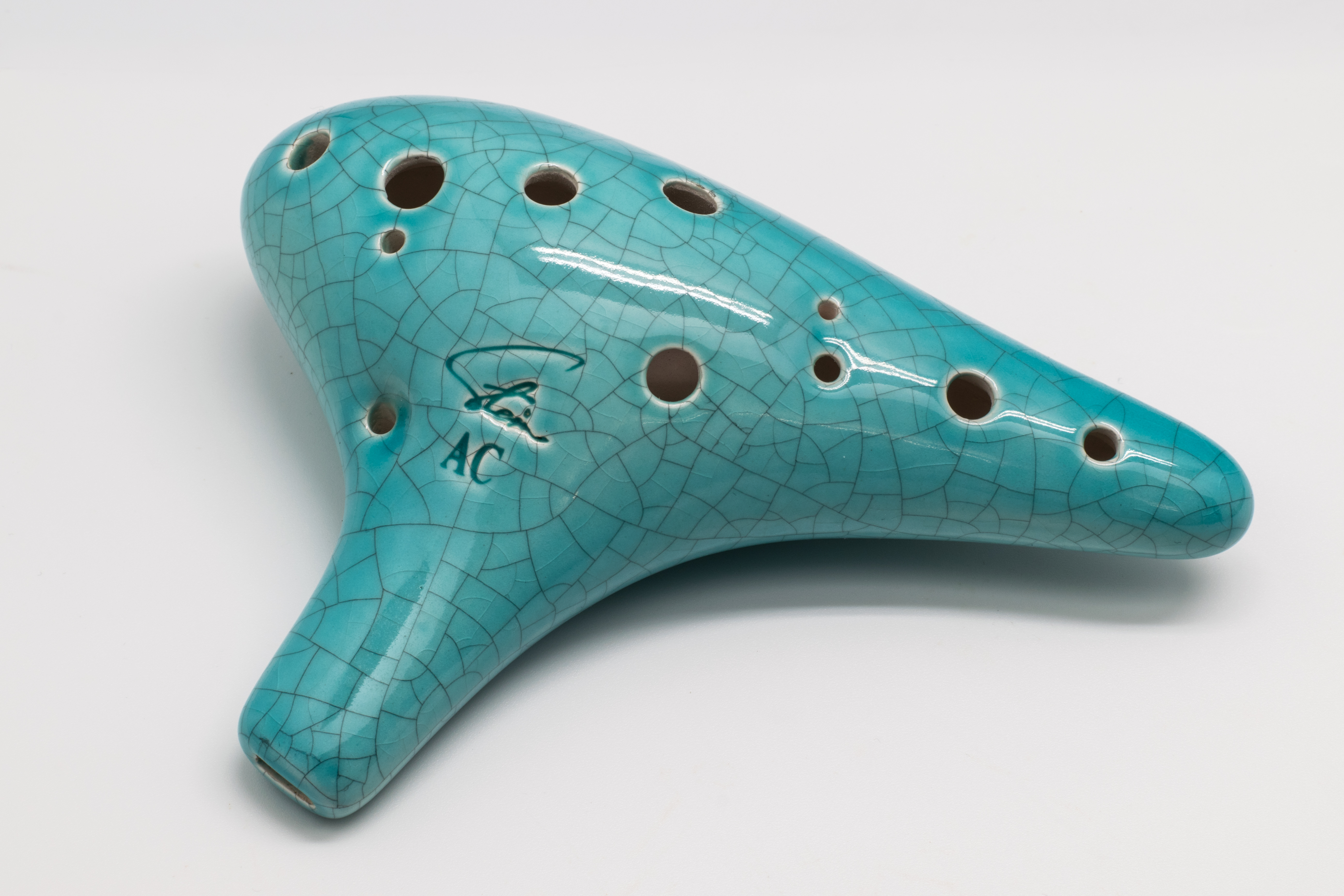
- A mono-chamber 12-hole ocarina
- Classification: Wind, woodwind, aerophone
- Hornbostel–Sachs classification: 421.221.42 (Vessel flute with duct and fingerholes)

Related instruments
- Xun, slide whistle, tin whistle, molinukai

Sound sample
- Sound of an ocarina An E major (in concert pitch) scale, followed by a rendition of "Frère Jacques". This is a home-made six-hole English pendant ocarina.; Carnival of Venice "Carnival of Venice" – ocarina played by Mosé Tapiero.

The ocarina (otherwise known as a 'potato flute') is a wind musical instrument; it is a type of vessel flute. Variations exist, but a typical ocarina is an enclosed space with four to twelve finger holes and a mouthpiece that projects from the body. It is traditionally made from clay or ceramic, but other materials are also used, such as plastic, wood, glass, metal, or bone. The Italian ocarina was invented in 1853 by 17-year-old Giuseppe Donati, who also gave it the name ocarina. Donati handmade each ocarina from clay, with anything from 7 to 10 finger-holes and a spout for a mouthpiece.

== History ==
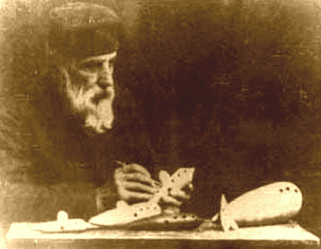
Giuseppe Donati, Italian inventor of the modern ocarina, with his work

The ocarina belongs to a very old family of instruments, believed to date back over 12,000 years. Ocarina-type instruments have been of particular importance as first invented in Chinese and Mesoamerican cultures. For the Chinese, the instrument played an important role in their long history of song and dance. The ocarina has features similar to the xun (塤), another important Chinese instrument (but is different in that the ocarina uses an internal duct, whereas the xun is blown across the outer edge). In Korea, the xun is known as the hun (Korean: 훈; Hanja: 壎). In Japan, the xun is known as the tsuchibue (土笛; lit. 'earthen flute'). Different expeditions to Mesoamerica, including the one conducted by Cortés, resulted in the introduction of the ocarina to the courts of Europe. Both the Maya and Aztecs produced versions of the ocarina, but it was the Aztecs who brought to Europe the song and dance that accompanied the ocarina. The ocarina went on to become popular in European communities as a toy instrument.

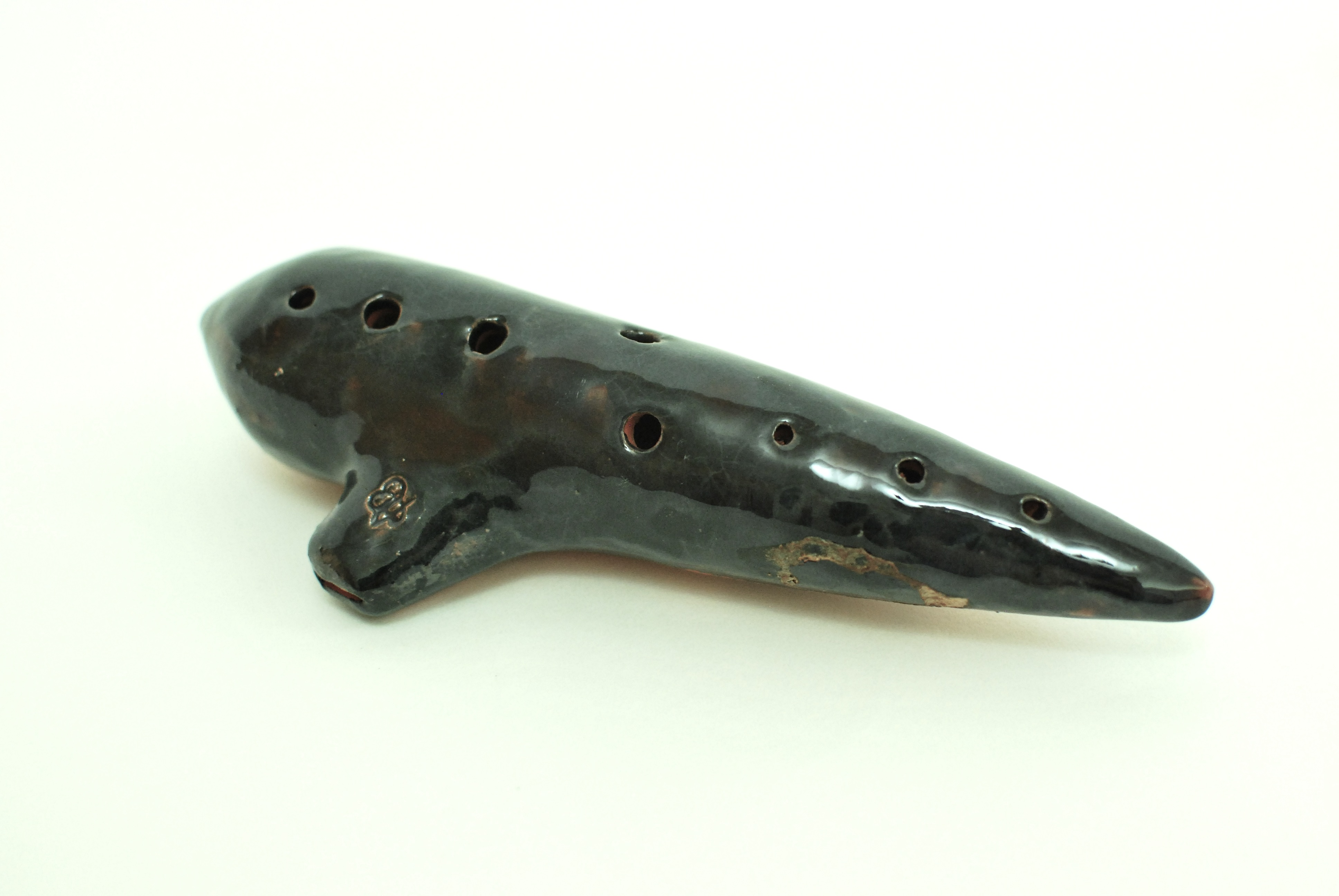
Ocarina, c. 1900, Museu de la Música de Barcelona

One of the oldest ocarinas found in Europe is from Runik, Kosovo. The Runik ocarina is a Neolithic flute-like wind instrument, and is the earliest musical instrument ever reported in Kosovo. The modern European ocarina dates back to the 19th century, when Giuseppe Donati from Budrio, a town near Bologna, Italy, transformed the ocarina from a toy, which played only a few notes, into a more comprehensive instrument (known as the first "classical" ocarina). The word ocarina derives from ucaréṅna, which in the Bolognese dialect means "little goose". An earlier similar instrument was known in Europe as a gemshorn, which was made from chamois (Dutch: gems) horns.

In 1964, John Taylor, an English mathematician, developed a fingering system that allowed an ocarina to play a full chromatic octave using only four holes. This is now known as the English fingering system, and is used extensively for pendant ocarinas. It is also used in several multi-chamber ocarinas, especially in ones that are designed to play more than one note at a time.

The ocarina is featured in the 1998 Nintendo 64 game The Legend of Zelda: Ocarina of Time, as well as its 2000 sequel, The Legend of Zelda: Majora's Mask, which has been credited for increasing the popularity and sales of ocarinas due to the game's strong sales. In 2026, Nintendo announced that they would sell an official ocarina instrument to promote the release of the Nintendo Switch 2 remake to Ocarina of Time.

=== Uses ===
French composer Pierre Arvay (1924–1980) wrote several pieces of library music for the ocarina. One of these – Merry ocarina – became well known in the UK when it was used as a regular musical segment in the BBC children's programme Vision On, broadcast between 1964 and 1976.

Hungarian-Austrian composer György Ligeti (1923–2006) called for four ocarinas (to be performed by woodwind players who play their own instruments during the rest of the piece) in his Violin Concerto, completed in 1993. In 1974, the Polish composer Krzysztof Penderecki (1933–2020) incorporated 12 ocarinas in his composition The Dream of Jacob. Later, he incorporated 50 in the final section of his Symphony No. 8, completed in 2008, where they are meant to be played by members of the choir.

== Types ==
There are many different styles of ocarinas varying in shape and the number of holes:

- Transverse (sweet potato) – This is the best-known style of ocarina. It has a rounded shape and is held with two hands horizontally. Depending on the number of holes, the player opens one more hole than the previous note to ascend in pitch. The two most common transverse ocarinas are 10-hole (invented by Giuseppe Donati in Italy) and 12-hole. They have a range of between an octave plus a fourth and an octave plus a minor sixth.
- Pendants:
  - English pendant – These are usually very small and portable, and use the English fingering system devised by John Taylor (4–6 holes). This fingering system allows them to achieve a range of between an octave and an octave plus a major second.
  - Peruvian pendant – Dating from the time of the Incas, used as instruments for festivals, rituals, and ceremonies. They are often seen with designs of animals. They usually have 8–9 holes.
- Inline – These ocarinas are usually rectangular or oval-shaped and are constructed so that the instrument points away from the musician when played. Most inline ocarinas have a similar or identical fingering system to transverse ocarinas.
- Multi-chambered ocarinas (usually called "double ocarina" or "triple ocarina" according to the number of chambers) – These are essentially separate ocarinas molded into one body, each chamber having its own mouthpiece and its own set of finger holes. This construction usually either expands the range of the instrument or allows multiple notes to be played at once. Although multi-chamber ocarinas can be made in transverse, inline, or pendant style, the transverse style is the most common. A typical transverse double ocarina plays two octaves plus a minor third, and a transverse triple ocarina usually plays with a range of about two octaves plus a minor seventh.
- Keys and slides – Beginning in the late 19th century, several makers have also produced ocarinas with keys and slides. These mechanisms either expand the instrument's range, help fingers reach holes that are widely spaced, or make it easier to play notes that are not in the native key of the instrument.

== Gallery ==
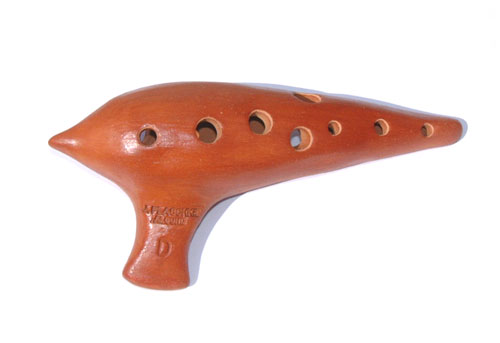
A transverse ocarina

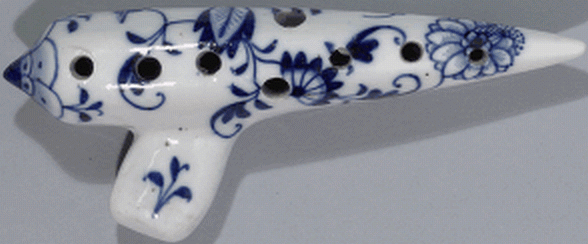
Meissen "Blue Onion" pattern porcelain transverse ocarina, early 20th century

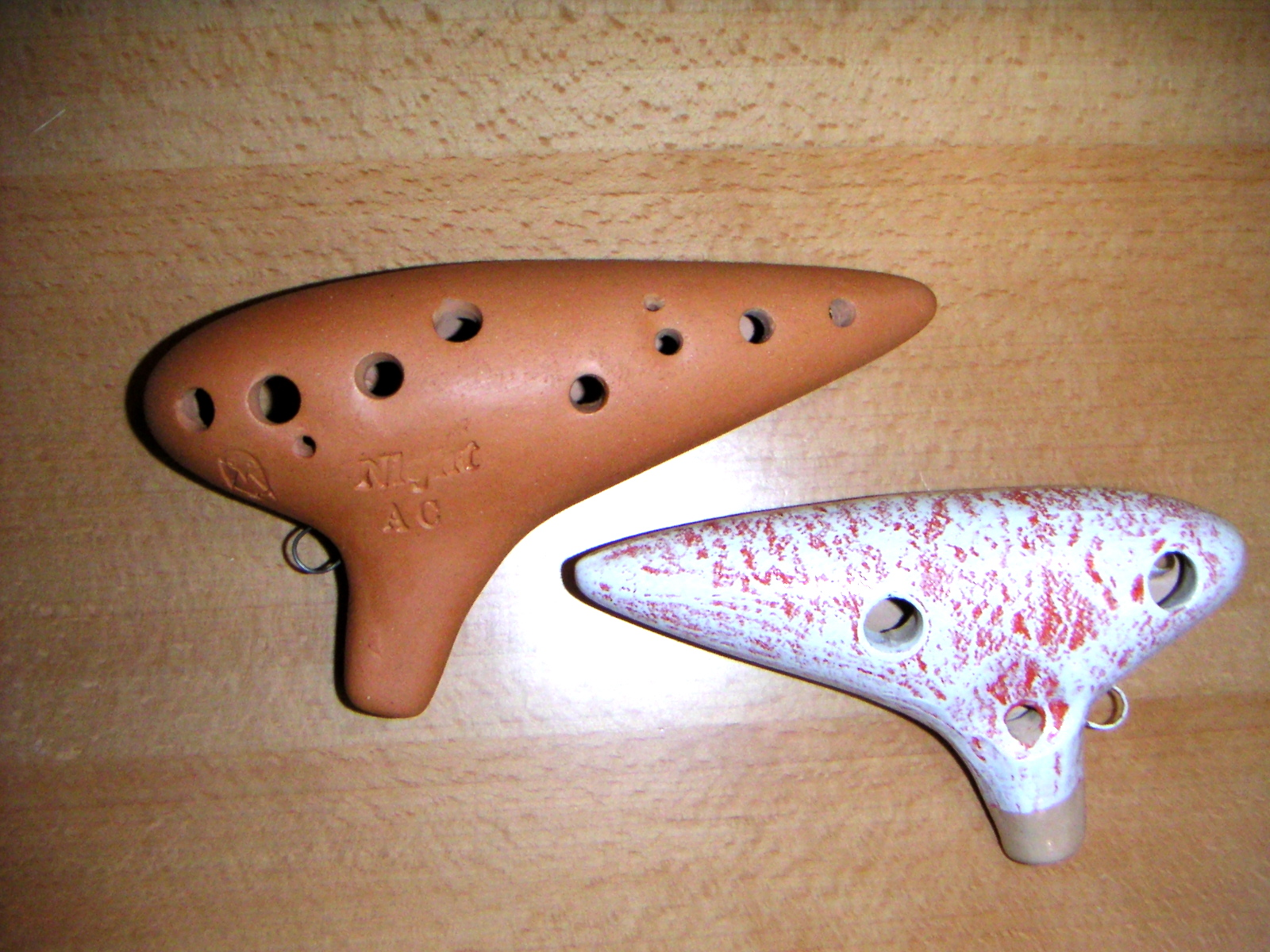
Front and back view of transverse ocarinas. The double holes on front indicate a fingering system developed in 20th-century Japan.

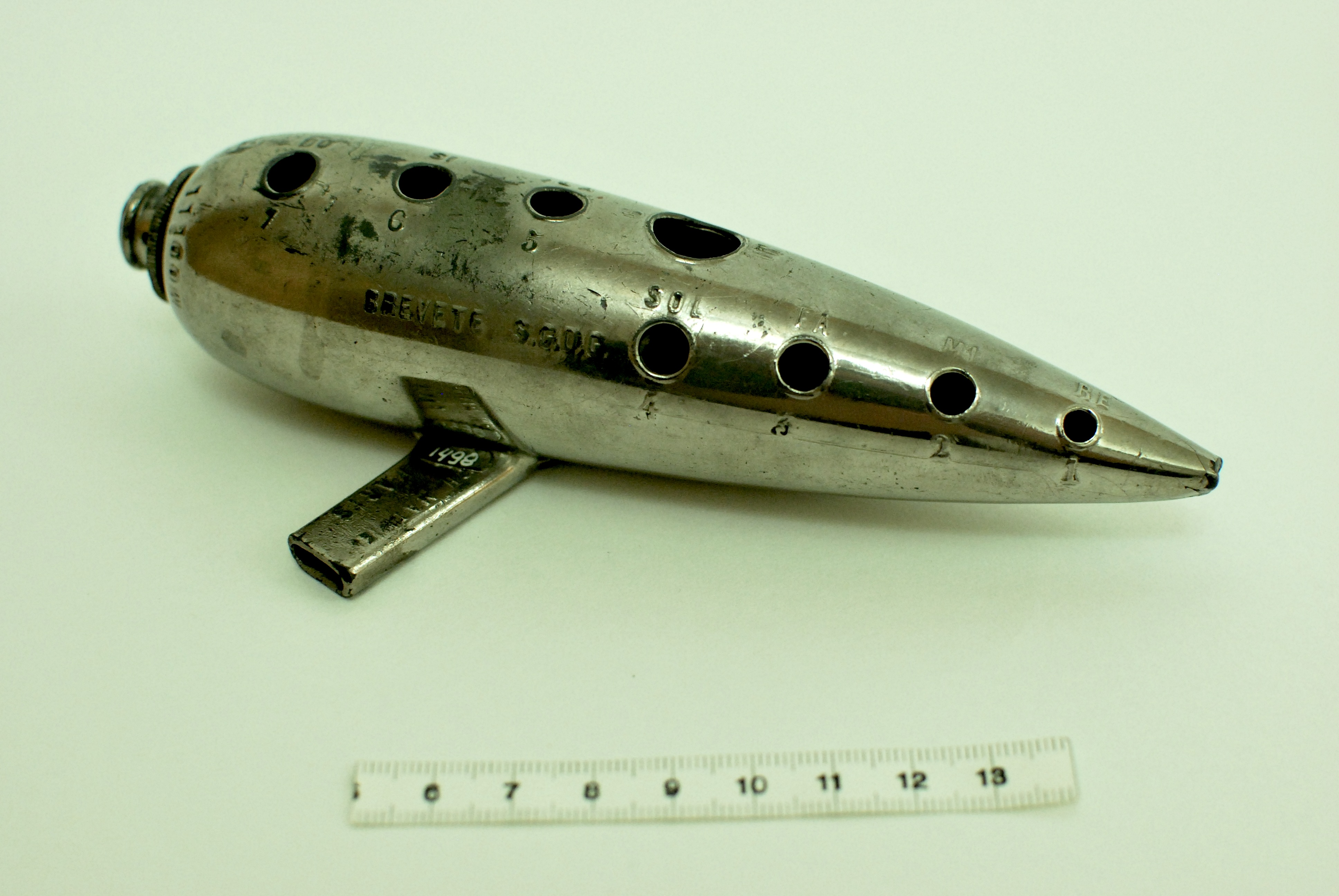
Metal transverse ocarina of 1875

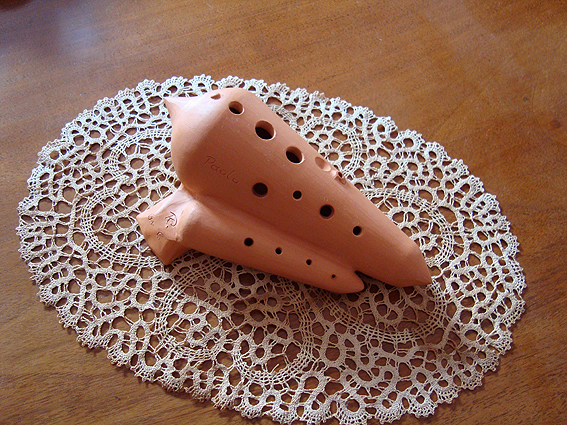
A double-chambered transverse ocarina (mouthpiece on the side)

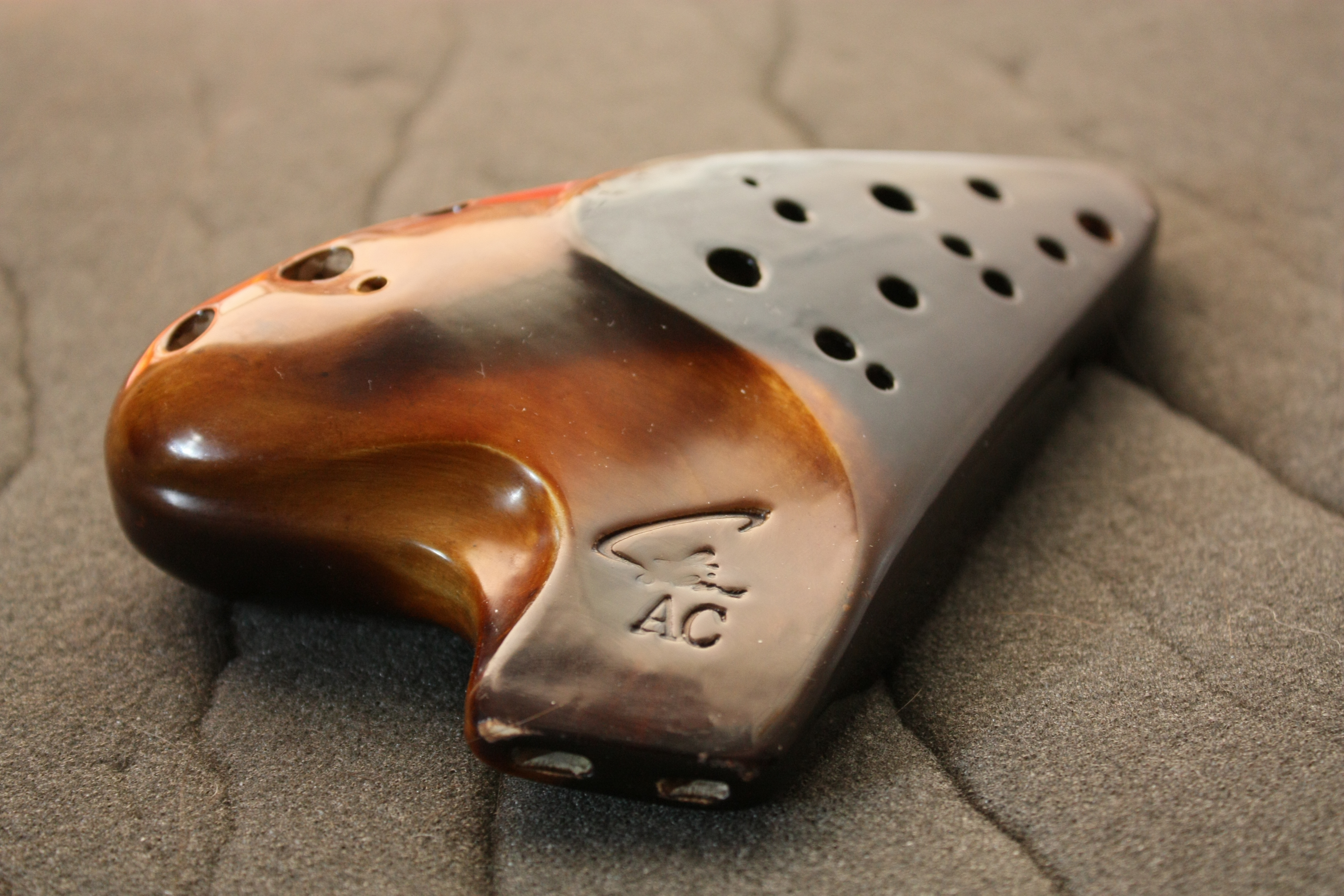
An Asian double chambered ocarina; the two blow holes in the mouthpiece are clearly visible. The separate chambers make possible an extended range of notes (17 in total, in this case from A4 to C6)

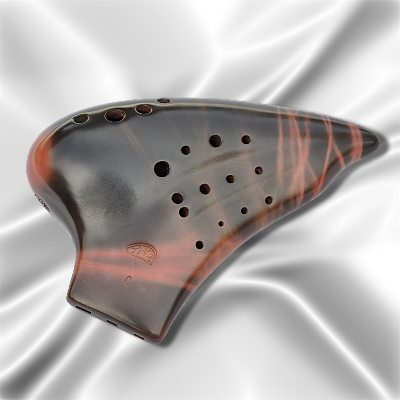
A triple-chambered ocarina in the bass register

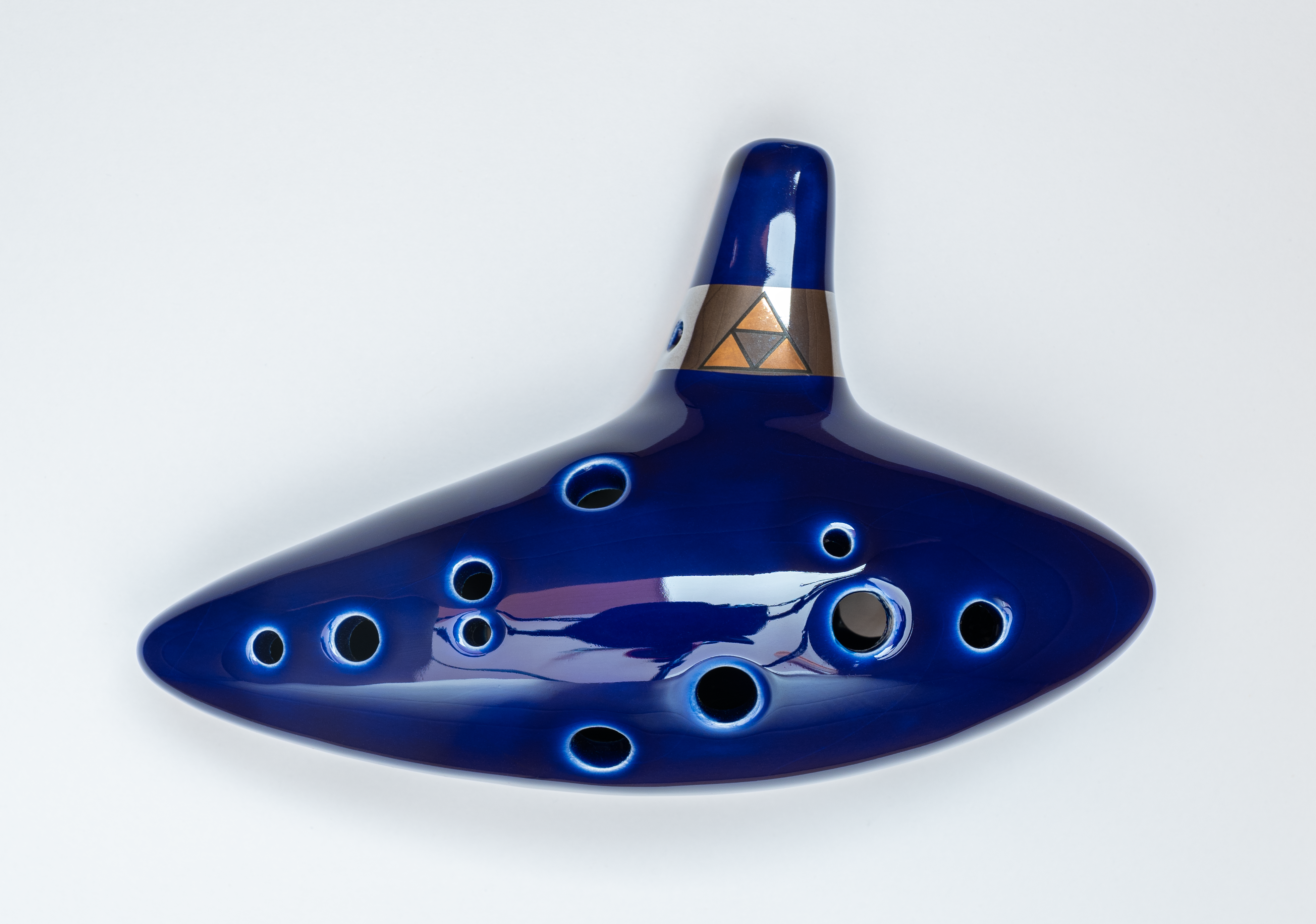
An ocarina design based on the titular instrument in the video game The Legend of Zelda: Ocarina of Time

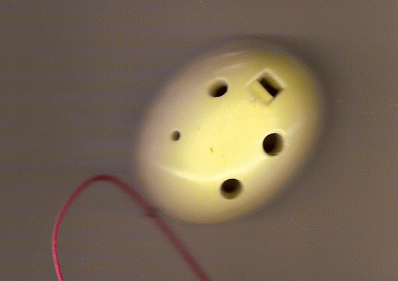
The English pendant ocarina, invented in the 1960s by John Taylor, produces a chromatic octave using just four finger holes

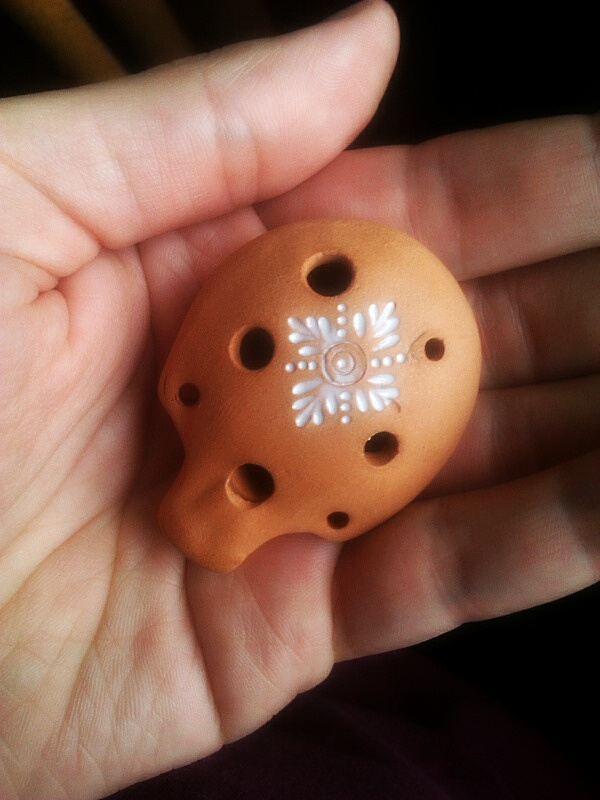
English pendant ocarina (unstrung, with two suspension holes) held in the hand

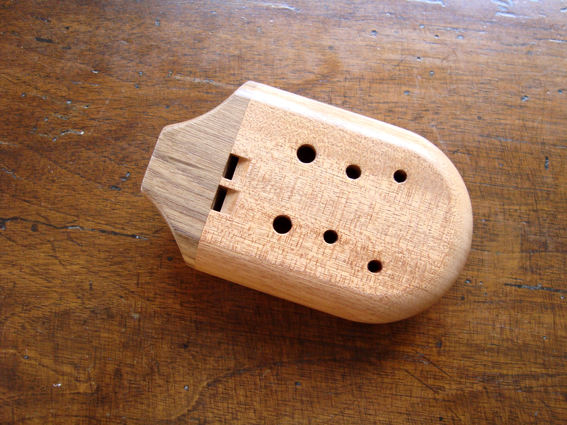
A double-chambered English pendant

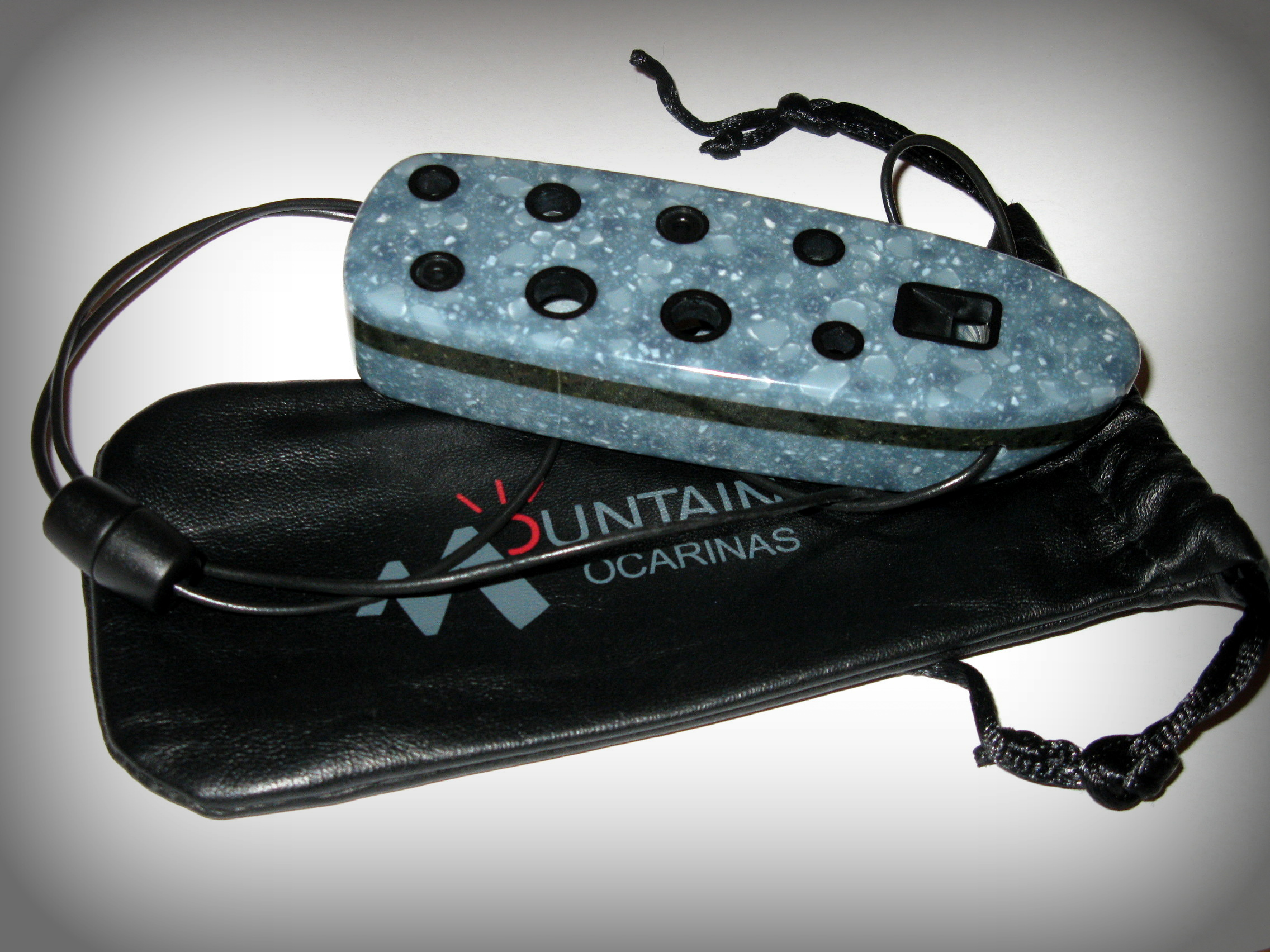
An inline ocarina

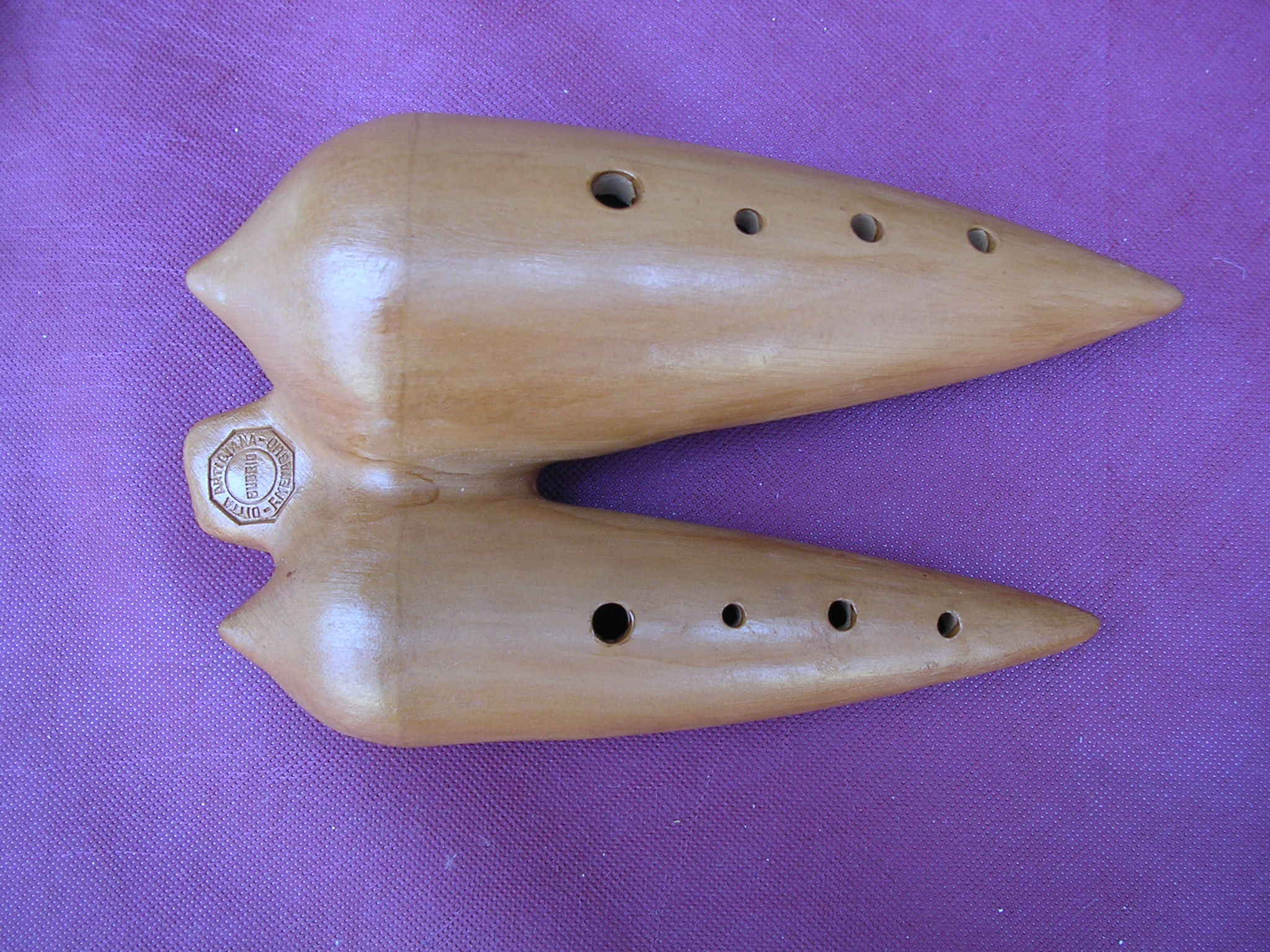
A double-chambered inline ocarina

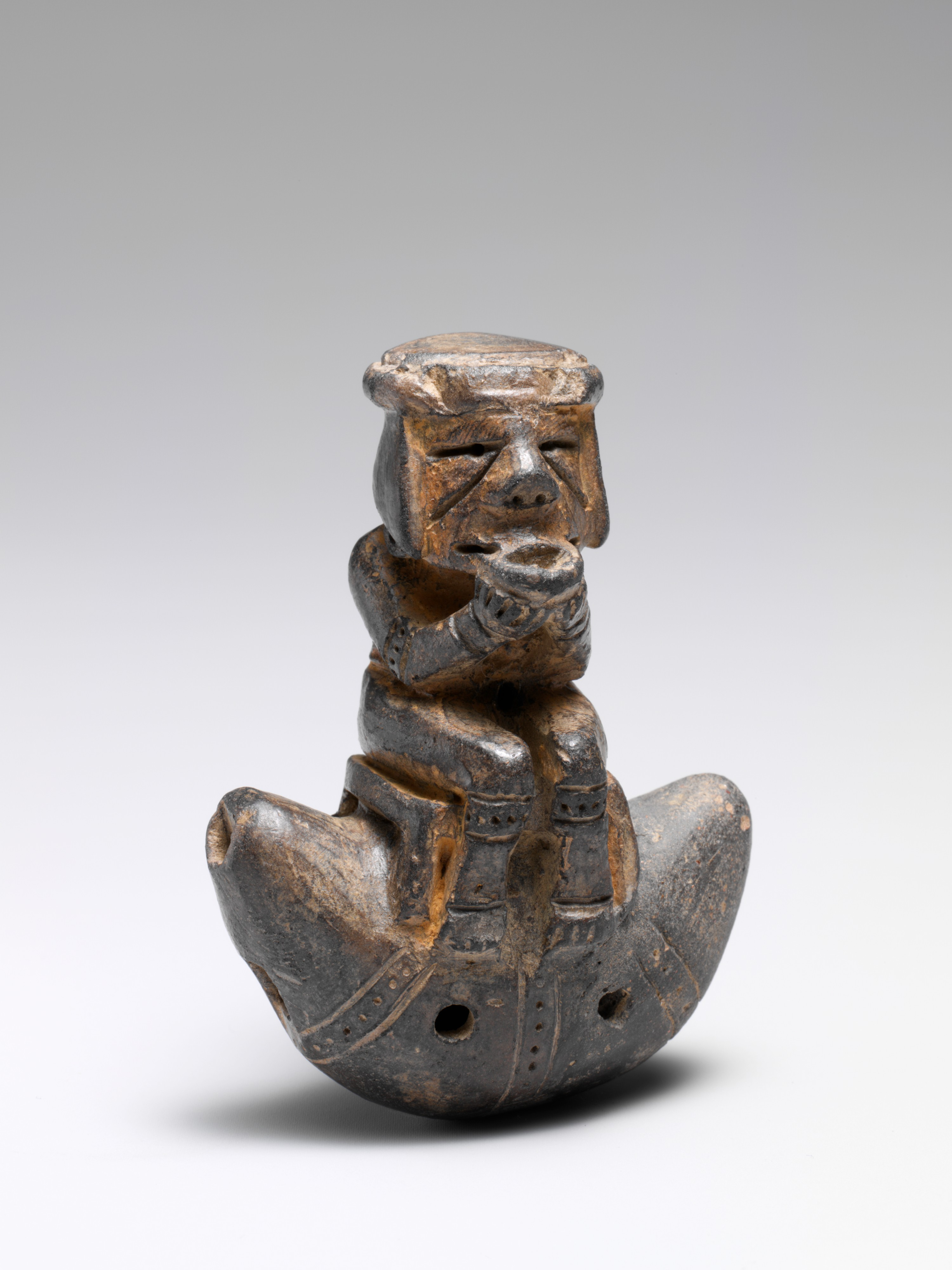
Ceramic pre-Columbian ocarina, c. 1300–1500, Tairona people, Sierra Nevada de Santa Marta, Colombia

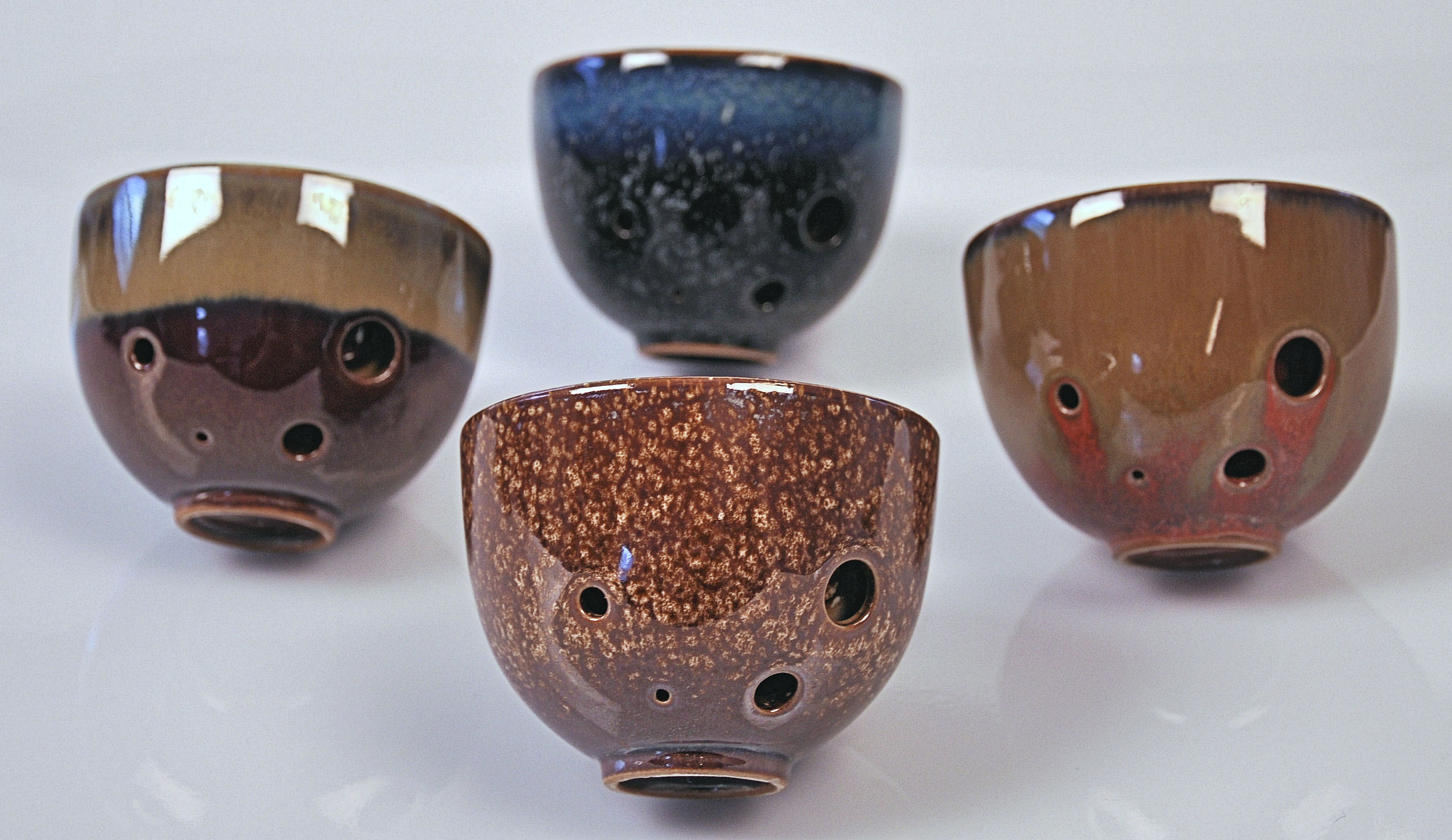
Selection of novelty "teacarinas" that are also functional teacups

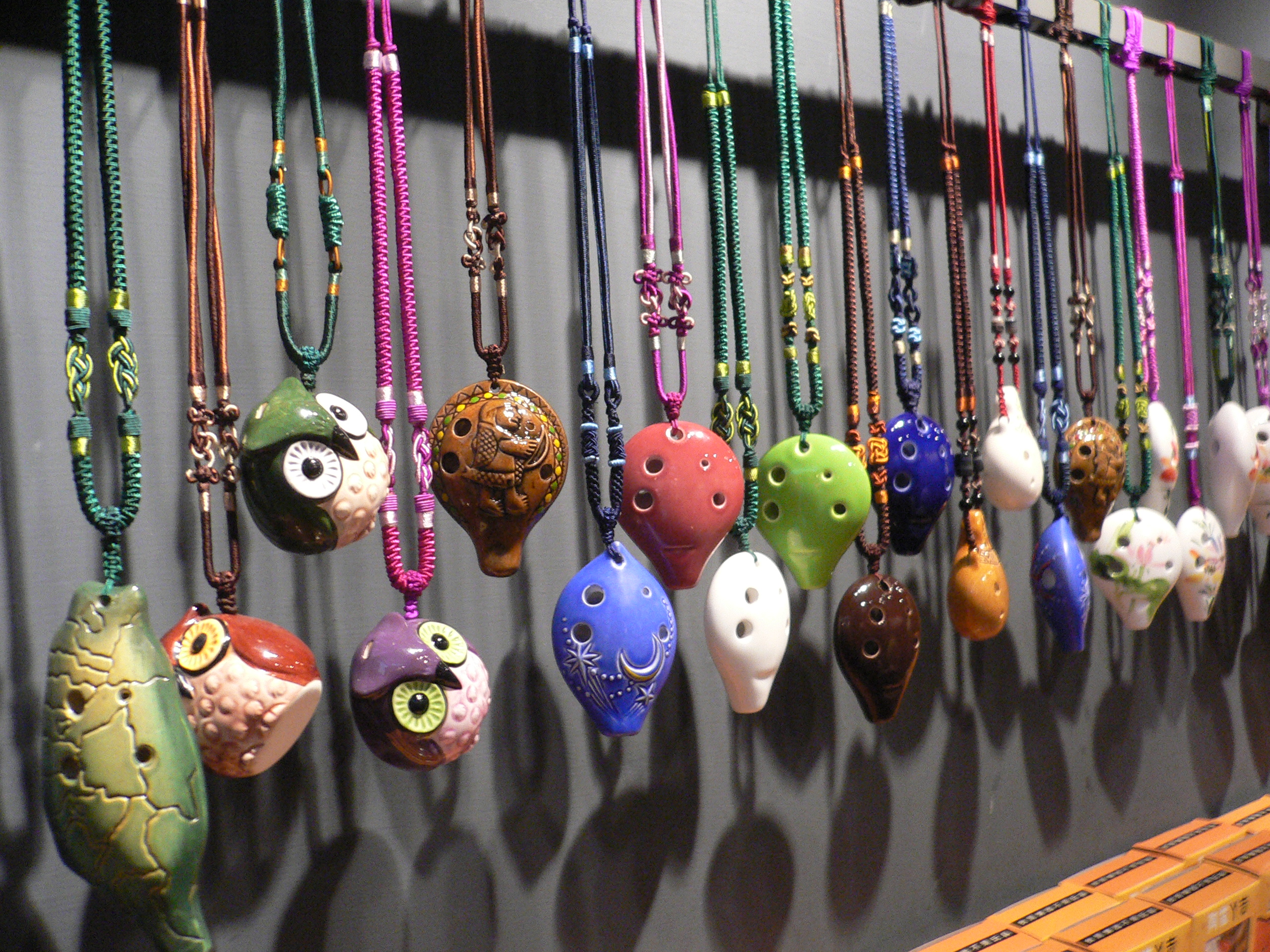
Owl-shaped ocarinas on sale in a shop in Taiwan

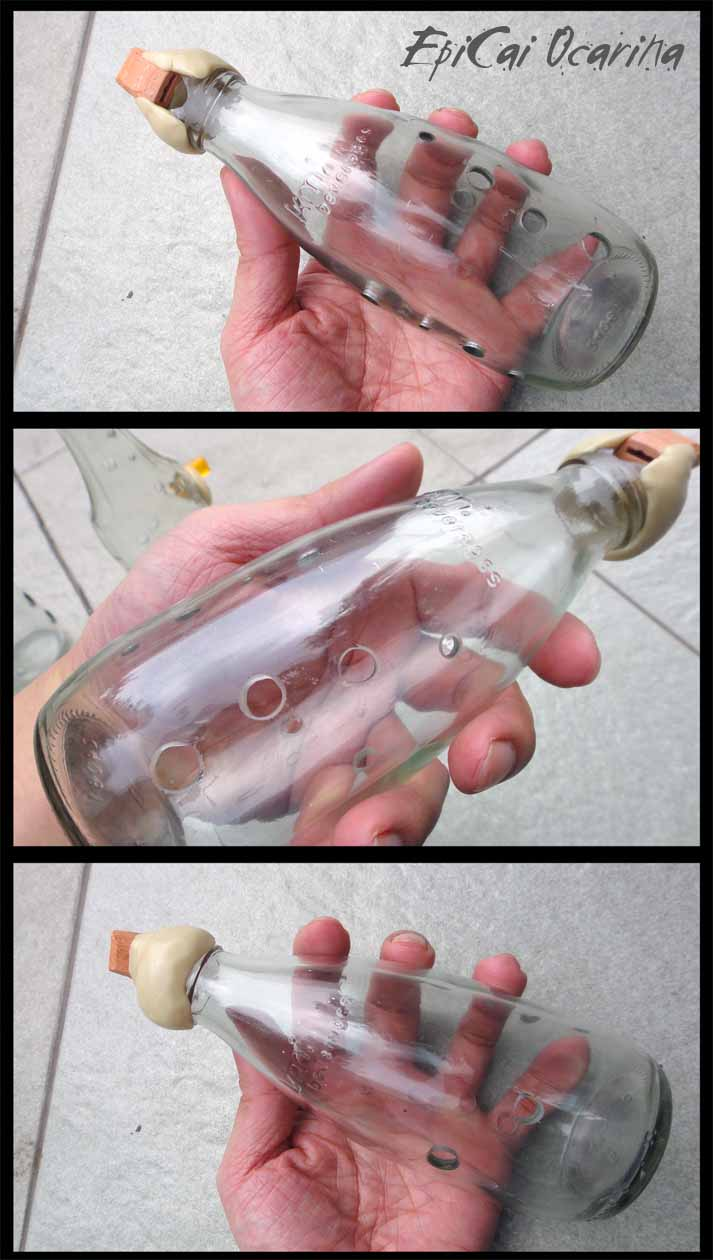
Ocarina made from a bottle

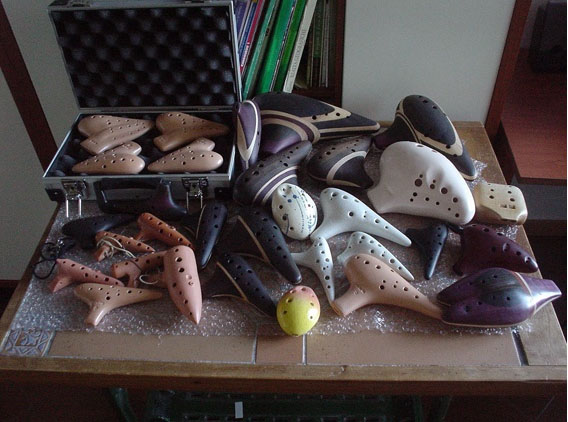
A collection of ocarinas

== Musical performance ==
=== Tone production and acoustics ===
How an ocarina works:

1. Air enters through the windway
2. Air strikes the labium, producing sound
3. Air pulses in and out of the ocarina, as the vessel resonates a specific pitch (see Helmholtz resonator)
4. Covering holes lowers the pitch; uncovering holes raises the pitch
5. Blowing more softly lowers the pitch; blowing harder raises it. Breath force can change the pitch by several semitones, of which about a third of a semitone either way is useful. Using too much or too little air will create an unpleasant tone. The fact that small changes to the flow of air will change the tuning (rather than the loudness) is why ocarinas generally have no tuning mechanism or dynamic range, and why it is hard to learn to play one in tune.

The airstream is directed toward the labium by a fipple or internal duct, which is a narrowing rectangular slot in the mouthpiece, rather than relying on the player's lips to aim the airstream as in a transverse flute. Like other flutes, the airstream alternates quickly between the inner and outer face of the labium as the pressure in the ocarina chamber oscillates.

At first, the sound is a broad-spectrum "noise" (i.e. "chiff"), but those frequencies that are identical with the fundamental frequency of the resonating chamber (which depends on the fingering), are selectively amplified. A Helmholtz resonating chamber is unusually selective in amplifying a single frequency. Most resonators also amplify more overtones. As a result, ocarinas and other vessel flutes have a distinctive overtoneless sound.

Unlike many flutes, ocarinas do not rely on pipe length to produce a particular tone. Instead, the tone is dependent on the ratio of the total surface area of opened holes to the total cubic volume enclosed by the instrument. This means that, unlike a transverse flute or recorder, sound is created by resonance of the entire cavity and the placement of the holes on an ocarina is largely irrelevant – their size is the most important factor. Instruments that have toneholes close to the voicing/embouchure should be avoided, however; as an ocarina is a Helmholtz resonator, this weakens tonal production.

The resonator in the ocarina can create overtones, but because of the common "egg" shape, these overtones are many octaves above the keynote scale. In similar Helmholtz resonator instruments with a narrow cone shape, like the Gemshorn or Tonette, some partial overtones are available. The technique of overblowing to get a range of higher-pitched notes is possible with the ocarina but not widely used because the resulting note is not "clean" enough, so the range of pitches available is limited by the total area of the holes.

Some ocarina makers bypass these physical limitations by creating ocarinas that have two or three resonating chambers, each with their own windway and labium. There are two main systems that dictate how these additional chambers are tuned: the Asian system and the Pacchioni system. The Asian system maximizes range by beginning each chamber one semitone higher than the highest note of the previous chamber. The Pacchioni system instead focuses on smoothing the transition between chambers by overlapping their ranges slightly, thereby making it easier to play melodies that fall in that range.

=== Musical notation and tablature ===
Fingering chart for a 12-hole alto ocarina in C

Ocarina music is written in three main ways. The most apparent is the use of sheet music. There are archives of sheet music either specifically written for ocarinas, or adapted from piano sheet music. Since some ocarinas are fully chromatic and can be played in professional musical situations, including classical and folk, sheet music is an ideal notation for ocarinas.

Second is the use of numerical tablature, which expresses the musical notes as numbers. Some makers have developed their own system of numerical tablature for their ocarinas, while others follow a more universal system where numbers correspond to different notes on the scale. This method is typically used by beginners who have not learned to read sheet music.

A third method uses a pictorial tablature similar to the ocarina's finger hole pattern, with blackened holes that represent holes to cover. The tablature represents the holes on the top of the ocarina, and, where necessary, the holes on the underside. This enables easy playing, particularly for beginners. The two most popular tablature systems are:

- The John Taylor four-hole system (invented in 1964 by British mathematician John Taylor)
- The 10 hole sweet potato system (invented by Giuseppe Donati of Budrio Italy)

Depending on the artist, some may write a number or figure over the picture to depict how many beats to hold the note.

=== Articulation ===
Due to its lack of keys, the ocarina shares many articulations with the tin whistle, such as cuts, strikes, rolls, and slides. However, tonguing is used more often on ocarina than on tin whistle, and vibrato is always achieved through adjusting breath pressure instead of with the fingers.

== Similar instruments ==
Other vessel flutes include the Chinese xun and African globe flutes. The xun (simplified Chinese: 埙; traditional: 塤; pinyin: xūn) is a Chinese vessel flute made of clay or ceramic. It is one of the oldest Chinese instruments. Shaped like an egg, it differs from the ocarina in being side-blown, like the Western concert flute, rather than having a recorder-like mouthpiece (a fipple or beak). Similar instruments exist in Korea (the hun) and Japan (the tsuchibue).

A related family of instruments is the closed-pipe family, which includes the panpipes and other instruments that produce their tone by vibrating a column of air within a stopped cylinder.

The old fashioned jug band jug also has similar properties.

The traditional German gemshorn works nearly the same way as an ocarina. The only difference is the material it is made from: the horn of a chamois, goat, or other suitable animal.

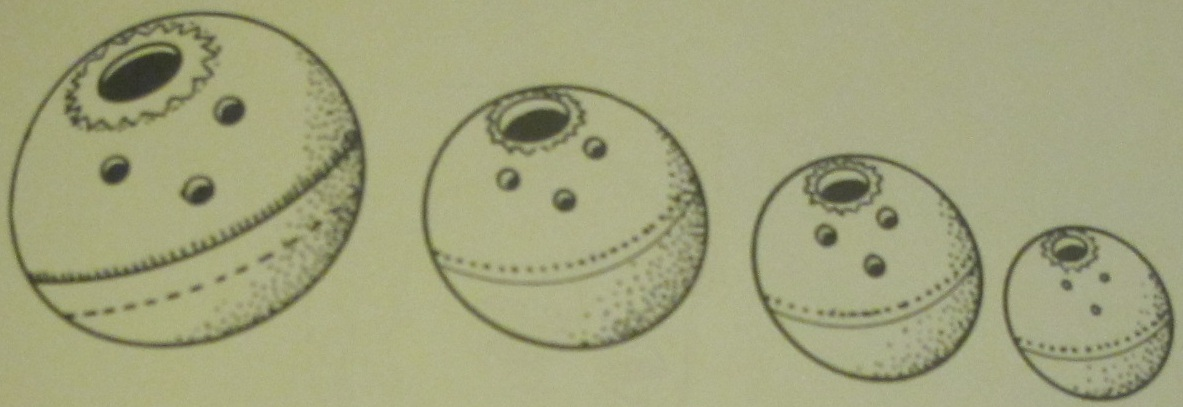
Sindhi borrindos, a form of vessel flute produced in different sizes to give different tones. The borrindo is made out of soft alluvial clay, plentiful in the central Indus Valley.

The borrindo is a simple hollow clay ball with three to four fingering holes, one hole slightly larger than the other three, which are smaller and of equal size to one another. The holes are arranged in an isosceles triangular form. The borrindo is made out of soft alluvial clay available in plenty everywhere in the central Indus Valley. Being of the simplest design, it is made even by children. Some adults make fine borrindos of larger size, put pottery designs on them, and bake them. These baked borrindos, with pottery designs, are the later evolved forms of this musical instrument, which appears to have previously been used in its simple unbaked form for a long time. The sound notes are produced by blowing somewhat horizontally into the larger hole. Finger tips are placed on smaller holes to regulate the notes. Its ease of play makes it popular among children and the youth.

== See also ==
- Hand flute
- The Legend of Zelda: Ocarina of Time
