= 50 Cent videography =

50 Cent video discography
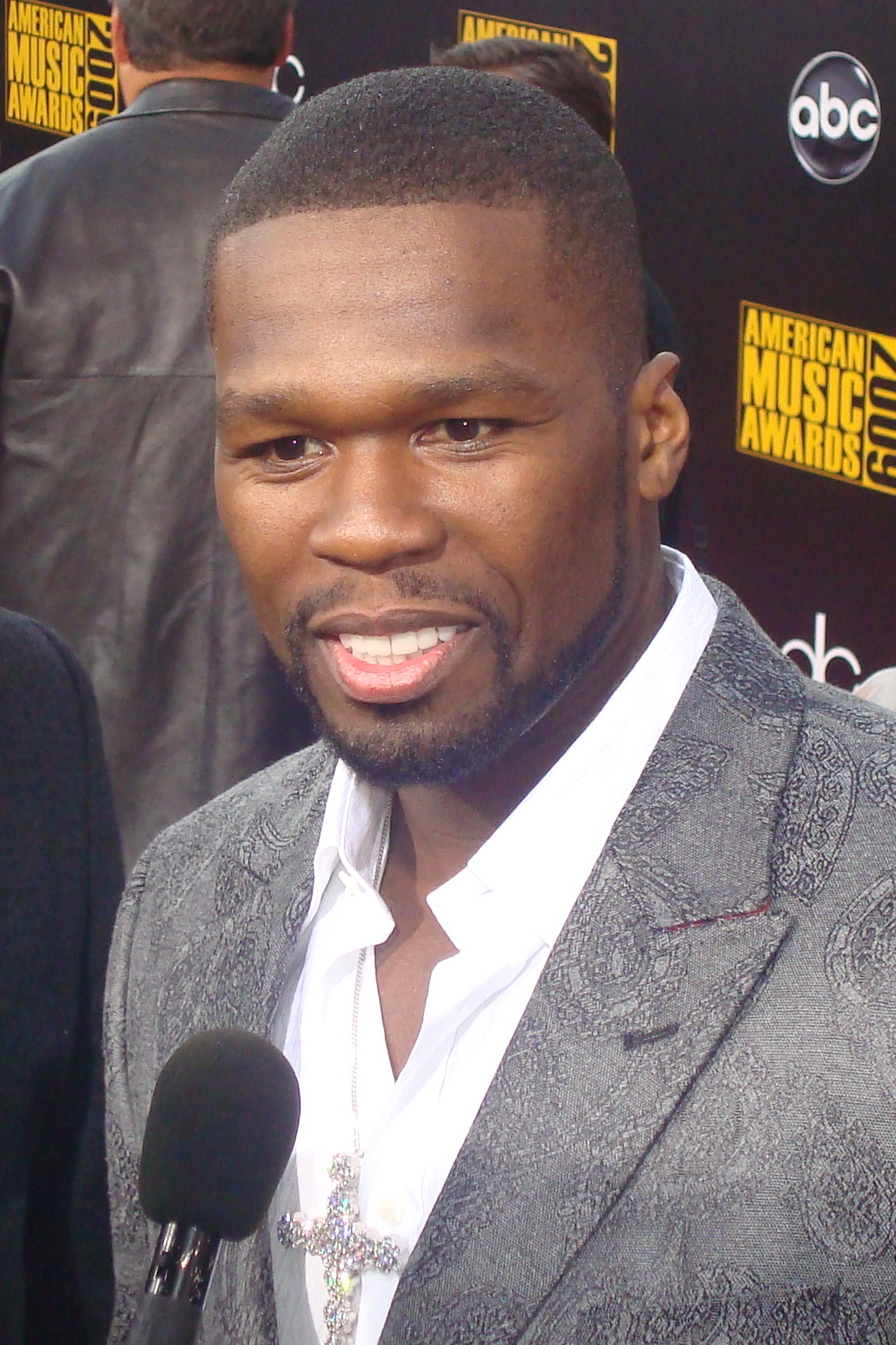
- 50 Cent in 2009
- Music videos: 89
- Television: 31
- Video games: 3
- Films: 29

American rapper 50 Cent has been featured in 88 music videos, 37 television programs, 25 films, and 3 video games.

== Filmography ==
=== Film ===
Year	Title	Role	Notes
2005	Get Rich or Die Tryin'	Marcus	
2006	Vengeance	Black	
2006	Home of the Brave	Jamal Aiken	
2007	Live!	Himself	
2008	Righteous Kill	Spider	
2009	Before I Self Destruct	Clarence	Writer/Director, direct-to-video
2009	Streets of Blood	Stan Johnson	Direct-to-video
2009	Dead Man Running	Thigo	Direct-to-video
2010	Caught in the Crossfire	Tino	Executive producer, direct-to-video
2010	13	Jimmy	Direct-to-video
2010	Gun	Rich	Writer, direct-to-video
2010	Twelve	Lionel	Direct-to-video
2010	Morning Glory	Himself	Cameo
2011	Blood Out	Hardwick	Executive Producer, direct-to-video
2011	Setup	Sonny	Producer, direct-to-video
2011	All Things Fall Apart	Deon	Writer, direct-to-video
2012	Freelancers	Malo	Producer, direct-to-video
2012	Fire with Fire	Lamar	Producer, direct-to-video
2012	How to Make Money Selling Drugs	Himself	
2013	Escape Plan	Hush	
2013	Last Vegas	Himself	Cameo
2013	The Frozen Ground	Pimp Clate Johnson	Producer, direct-to-video
2014	Vengeance	Black	Direct-to-video
2014	The Prince	The Pharmacy	Direct-to-video
2015	Spy	Himself	Cameo
2015	Southpaw	Jordan Mains	
2016	Popstar: Never Stop Never Stopping	Himself	Cameo
2017	The Pursuit		Producer, direct-to-video
2018	Den of Thieves	Enson Levoux	
2018	Escape Plan 2: Hades	Hush	Direct-to-video
2019	Escape Plan: The Extractors	Hush	Direct-to-video
2023	Expend4bles	Easy Day	
2024	Boneyard	Chief Carter	
2025	Den of Thieves 2: Pantera	N/A	Executive producer
2025	Skillhouse	Himself	
2026	Moses the Black	N/A	Executive producer
2026	Street Fighter	Balrog	
2027	Den of Thieves 3	N/A	Executive producer

=== Television ===
Year	Title	Role	Notes
2003	Fromage 2003	Himself	TV movie
2003–04	The Howard Stern Show	Himself	3 episodes
2003–14	Jimmy Kimmel Live!	Himself	10 episodes
2005	The Simpsons	Himself (voice)	Episode: "Pranksta Rap"
2005	Brain Fart	Himself	TV movie
2005–07	Late Show with David Letterman	Himself	2 episodes
2005–08	Late Night with Conan O'Brien	Himself	3 episodes
2005–10	The View	Himself	2 episodes
2006	Flavor of Love	Himself	Famous Friends And Strangeness
2006	Forbes Celebrity 100: Who Made Bank?	Himself	TV movie
2006	Last Call with Carson Daly	Himself	2 episodes
2007	Diary	Himself	MTVs Diary of 50 Cent
2007	America's Next Top Model	Himself	The Girl Who Gets Thrown In The Pool
2007–10	The Late Late Show with Craig Ferguson	Himself	2 episodes
2007–13	MTV Cribs	Himself	2 episodes
2008–09	50 Cent: The Money and the Power	Himself	Episode: "Choose Your Crew Wisely"
2008–09	The Tyra Banks Show	Himself	2 episodes
2009	Entourage	Himself	Episode: "One Car, Two Car, Red Car, Blue Car"
2009	The Tonight Show with Conan O'Brien	Himself	Season 1: episode 105
2009	Party Monsters Cabo	Himself	Episode 6
2009	The Graham Norton Show	Himself	Season 6, episode 10
2009–10	The Tonight Show Starring Jimmy Fallon	Himself	2 episodes
2009–13	Rachael Ray	Himself	3 episodes
2009–14	Chelsea Lately	Himself	2 episodes
2011	George Lopez	Himself	Episode: Feb. 8
2011	Conan	Himself	Octoparrot vs. Megakitten
2011	The X Factor	Himself	Live Season Finale, Part 2 of 2
2012	The Finder	Big Glade	Episode: "Life After Death"
2012	Dream Machines	Himself	2 episodes
2013	Robot Chicken	Himself	Episode: "Eaten by Cats"
2013	Katie	Himself	Episode 1.79
2014–20	Power	Kanan	Executive producer
2013–14	Dream School	Himself	Producer
2014	The Today Show	Himself	Episode 2.56
2020–2021	For Life	Cassius Dawkins	Executive producer
2025	Colours with Transport	Nissan Juke	Class Teacher
2025	Sean Combs: The Reckoning	Himself	Executive producer
2026–present	Fightland	N/A	Executive producer

=== Video games ===
Year	Title	Voice role	Notes
2005	50 Cent: Bulletproof	Himself	Also likeness
2009	50 Cent: Blood on the Sand	Himself	Also likeness
2010	Call of Duty: Modern Warfare 2	Navy SEAL	

== Music videos ==
=== As lead artist ===
List of music videos as lead artist, with directors, showing year released
Title	Year	Director(s)
"Rowdy Rowdy"	1999	50 Cent
"Your Life's on the Line"	1999	50 Cent
"Wanksta"	2002	Jessy Terrero
"In da Club"	2003	Philip G. Atwell
"21 Questions" (featuring Nate Dogg)	2003	Dr. Dre, Phillip G. Atwell
"Many Men (Wish Death)"	2003	Jessy Terrero
"Heat"	2003	Ian Inaba, Stephen Marshall
"P.I.M.P." (Remix) (featuring Snoop Dogg, Lloyd Banks and Young Buck)	2003	Chris Robinson
"Disco Inferno"	2005	Ulysses Terrero
"Candy Shop" (featuring Olivia)	2005	Jessy Terrero
"Just a Lil Bit"	2005	Benny Boom
"Outta Control" (Remix) (featuring Mobb Deep)	2005	Jessy Terrero
"This Is 50"	2005	Broadway
"Piggy Bank"	2005	Broadway, Dan Melamid
"GATman and Robbin'" (featuring Eminem)	2005	Broadway
"I Don't Need 'Em" (featuring Olivia)	2005	Broadway
"Hustler's Ambition"	2005	Anthony Mandler
"Window Shopper"	2005	Benny Boom
"Best Friend" (Remix) (featuring Olivia)	2006	Marcus Raboy
"You Don't Know" (with Eminem, Lloyd Banks and Cashis)	2006	The Saline Project
"Straight to the Bank"	2007	Benny Boom
"Amusement Park"	2007	Benny Boom
"I Get Money"	2007	Broadway, 50 Cent
"Ayo Technology" (featuring Justin Timberlake)	2007	Joseph Kahn
"I'll Still Kill" (featuring Akon)	2007	Jessy Terrero
"Follow My Lead" (featuring Robin Thicke)	2007	Bernard Gourley
"Get Up"	2008	The Brothers Strause
"OK, You're Right"	2009	Broadway, 50 Cent
"Baby by Me" (featuring Ne-Yo)	2009	Chris Robinson
"Do You Think About Me"	2009	Chris Robinson
"Crime Wave"	2009	none
"Flight 187"	2009	none
"I'll Do Anything"	2009	none
"Queens, NY" (featuring Precious Paris)	2011	Jackson Smith
"I Just Wanna" (featuring Tony Yayo)	2011	Jackson Smith
"Wait Until Tonight"	2011	Jackson Smith
"Off and On"	2011	Jackson Smith
"They Burn Me"	2011	none
"Put Ya Hands Up"	2011	Jackson Smith
"Nah Nah Nah" (featuring Tony Yayo)	2011	none
"Shooting Guns" (featuring Kidd Kidd)	2012	none
"Murder One"	2012	Eif Rivera
"Get Busy" (featuring Kidd Kidd)	2012	none
"All His Love"	2012	Eif Rivera
"OJ" (featuring Kidd Kidd)	2012	Eif Rivera
"Double Up" (featuring Hayes)	2012	Eif Rivera
"Complicated"	2012	Eif Rivera
"I Ain't Gonna Lie" (featuring Robbie Nova)	2012	Eif Rivera
"Be My Bitch" (featuring Brevi)	2012	Eif Rivera
"Definition of Sexy"	2012	Eif Rivera
"Money"	2012	Eif Rivera
"First Date" (featuring Too Short)	2012	Eif Rivera
"United Nations"	2012	Eif Rivera
"My Life" (featuring Eminem and Adam Levine)	2012	Rich Lee
"Major Distribution" (featuring Young Jeezy and Snoop Dogg)	2013	Eif Rivera
"Financial Freedom"	2013	Eif Rivera
"We Up" (featuring Kendrick Lamar)	2013	Eif Rivera
"The Funeral"	2014	Eif Rivera
"Don't Worry 'Bout It"	2014	Eif Rivera
"Hold On"	2014	Eif Rivera
"Pilot"	2014	Eif Rivera
"Smoke" (featuring Trey Songz)	2014	Eif Rivera
"Big Rich Town" (featuring Joe)	2014	Eif Rivera
"Hustler"	2014	Eif Rivera
"Chase the Paper" (featuring Prodigy, Kidd Kidd and Styles P)	2014	Eif Rivera
"Everytime I Come Around" (featuring Kidd Kidd)	2014	Eif Rivera
"Irregular Heartbeat" (featuring Kidd Kidd and Jadakiss)	2014	Eif Rivera
"Winners Circle" (featuring Guordan Banks)	2014	Eif Rivera
"Twisted" (featuring Mr. Probz)	2014	Eif Rivera
"Animal Ambition"	2014	Eif Rivera
"You Know"	2014	Eif Rivera
"9 Shots"	2015	Eif Rivera
"I'm The Man" (featuring Sonny Digital)	2016	Eif Rivera
"I'm The Man (Remix)" (featuring Chris Brown)	2016	Eif Rivera
"No Romeo No Juliet" (featuring Chris Brown)	2016	Eif Rivera
"Still Think I'm Nothing" (featuring Jeremih)	2017	Eif Rivera
"Tryna F*ck Me Over" (featuring Post Malone)	2020	Eif Rivera
"Part of the Game" (featuring NLE Choppa)	2021	Eif Rivera and 50 Cent
"Power Powder Respect" (featuring Lil Durk and Jeremih)	2022	Eif Rivera

=== As featured artist ===
List of music videos as featured artist, with directors, showing year released
Title	Year	Director(s)
"React" (Onyx featuring 50 Cent, Bonifucco, Still Livin' and X-1)	1998	Noledge Productions
"Let Me In" (Young Buck featuring 50 Cent)	2004	Jessy Terrero
"How We Do" (The Game featuring 50 Cent)	2004	Hype Williams
"Hate It or Love It" (The Game featuring 50 Cent)	2005	The Saline Project
"So Seductive" (Tony Yayo featuring 50 Cent)	2005	Gil Green
"Have a Party" (Mobb Deep featuring 50 Cent and Nate Dogg)	2005	Benny Boom
"Hands Up" (Lloyd Banks featuring 50 Cent)	2006	Jessy Terrero
"Can't Leave 'em Alone" (Ciara featuring 50 Cent)	2007	Fat Cats
"Mujeres in the Club" (Wisin & Yandel featuring 50 Cent)	2009	Jessy Terrero
"Mean Mug" (Soulja Boy Tell'em featuring 50 Cent)	2010	Colin Tilley
"No Dejemos Que se Apague" (Wisin & Yandel featuring 50 Cent and T-Pain)	2010	Jessy Terrero
"Let's Get It In" (Lloyd featuring 50 Cent)	2010	Jessy Terrero
"Buzzin'" (Mann featuring 50 Cent)	2010	Jessy Terrero
"Down on Me" (Jeremih featuring 50 Cent)	2011	Colin Tilley
"Right There" (Nicole Scherzinger featuring 50 Cent)	2011	Paul Hunter
"Haters" (Tony Yayo featuring 50 Cent, Shawty Lo and Roscoe Dash)	2011	Mr. Boomtown
"Up!" (LoveRance featuring 50 Cent)	2011	Taj
"Riot" (Remix) (2 Chainz featuring 50 Cent)	2012	Eif Rivera
"Everything OK" (Precious Paris featuring 50 Cent)	2012	Streetheattv
"Look At Me" (Nat Lotto featuring 50 Cent and Uncle Murda)	2013	Picture Perfect
"Teen Spirit" (Remix) (SZA featuring 50 Cent)	2013	APLUSFILMZ
"Lotto" (Rotimi featuring 50 Cent)	2015	Eif Rivera
"Nobody" (Rotimi featuring T.I. and 50 Cent)	2017	Eif Rivera
"On & On" (Lenny Grant featuring 50 Cent and Jeremih)	2017	Eif Rivera
"Get the Strap" (Lenny Grant featuring 50 Cent, 6ix9ine and Casanova)	2018	Eif Rivera
"Hate Bein' Sober" (Chief Keef featuring 50 Cent and Wiz Khalifa)	2020	Eif Rivera
"The Woo" (Pop Smoke featuring 50 Cent and Roddy Ricch)	2020	Eif Rivera

== See also ==
- 50 Cent albums discography
- 50 Cent singles discography
