= Muzik (company) =

American consumer electronics company

- Type: Private
- Industry: Audio; Consumer electronics
- Founded: August 2012
- Headquarters: West Hollywood, California
- Key people: Jason Hardi (Founder); Tim Fyrst (CEO); Sarah Heering (COO)
- Products: Muzik One, Muzik Connect, Muzik LUX, Muzik LTD, Muzik Vision
- Website: https://muziklive.com/

Muzik, Inc is an American consumer electronics company that sells social media-compatible headphones. Company now gone bankrupt

== History ==
Muzik was founded in 2012 by Jason Hardi. He had previously worked with 50 Cent's SMS Audio headphones line. The company demoed a version of its headphones at the Consumer Electronics Show in 2013. Following a period of refinement, during which the company received $18 million in investments from Twitter and others, the headphones were given an official launch in 2016.

== Product ==
Muzik's headphones are wireless and are controlled by four touch-sensitive buttons on the outside of the right earphone, which allow the user to switch between songs, control volume, and share music with friends via social media networks such as Twitter, Facebook, and Spotify. Other features include high-definition audio, voice command, and motion sensor technology. The headphones also interface with Muzik Connect, a mobile app for Android and iOS that enables the product's social capabilities.

== Investors and partnerships ==
Muzik has had several high-profile investors, including Twitter; François-Henri Pinault, CEO of the luxury group Kering; athletes Chris Paul, Michael Jordan, Ndamukong Suh, Demaryius Thomas, Von Miller, Bradley Beal, and Dwyane Wade; entertainers Kevin Hart, Drake, T.I., and Questlove; motivational speaker Tony Robbins; and Microsoft executive Steve Guggenheimer. Gucci displayed custom Muzik headphones at a 2018 event. Muzik itself is an investor in Dash Radio.
