= Mother and Child Reunion (The Simpsons) =

- The Simpsons episode
- Episode no.: Season 32; Episode 20
- Directed by: Jennifer Moeller
- Written by: J. Stewart Burns
- Production code: QABF14
- Original air date: May 9, 2021

Guest appearances
- Werner Herzog as himself (The Amazing Herzog); Nate Silver as himself; George Stephanopoulos as himself

Episode features
- Couch gag: Marge is a bird laying on her eggs to keep them warm, until bird Homer jumps in and breaks them, tasting the yolk afterward.

Episode chronology
← Previous "Panic on the Streets of Springfield"	Next → "The Man from G.R.A.M.P.A."
- The Simpsons season 32

"Mother and Child Reunion" is the twentieth episode of the thirty-second season of the American animated television series The Simpsons, and the 704th episode overall. It aired in the United States on Fox on May 9, 2021. The episode was directed by Jennifer Moeller, and written by J. Stewart Burns. In this episode, Lisa in the future chooses not to go to college, which wounds Marge, and she teaches at her own school instead. Filmmaker Werner Herzog, statistician Nate Silver, and television host George Stephanopoulos appeared as themselves. The episode received mixed reviews.

The episode was dedicated in memory of Olympia Dukakis, who previously guest starred as a character named Zelda in the thirteenth season episode "The Old Man and the Key."

This episode could be interpreted as a failed prediction of Kamala Harris becoming the President of the United States, drawing a parallel to Lisa Simpson’s presidency in the show.

== Plot ==
The Simpson family goes to Werner Herzog's Magic Shop to buy a magic set for Lisa's birthday. When Bart traps Homer in a straitjacket, Marge asks them if they will ever stop fighting, to which Herzog asks if they want to see the future. He takes them to the back of his shop and reads them the future with tarot cards, and reveals that Lisa will become President of the United States, Homer will stop drinking, Bart will become a fine person, and there will be years of trouble between Marge and Lisa.

Nine years into the future, 17-year-old Lisa has to choose which college to go to. 19-year-old Bart reminds her that she could have had fun with her childhood, but instead focused on studying and got accepted to all colleges. Marge sets up a meeting with the family to celebrate her choice, but Lisa reveals that she has decided to not go to any college. This breaks Marge's future expectations that she had already prepared for Lisa and they soon argue over her decision.

Lisa gets advice from Ned Flanders and starts working at the Springfield Mall under the Squeaky Voiced Teen's ownership, but she soon dislikes her job and starts teaching instead. She creates her own school called the Lisa Simpson Academy and it expands all over the United States. She also runs for school superintendent against an older Superintendent Chalmers and wins, later running for U.S. president. She also wins the presidential election and moves into the White House at Inauguration Day.

By then, the family has changed in different ways: Marge and Lisa are barely speaking to each other, Bart is now a pot CEO and the owner of three NBA teams who visits Lisa. He makes her remember all the times that Marge was there for her in all the moments that she needed help, even if she forgot. Marge also visits Lisa and they reconcile, with the help of a mother/daughter translator.

Back in the present, Lisa asks Herzog how much of those events will be true and Nate Silver gives her a group of options, each with a different percentage. Homer asks if he can watch a game on the oracle, but Nate informs him it is not a television.

== Production ==
The episode was previously titled "Senior Moment" with the production code QABF09, before it switched with "Manger Things," which aired over a month prior to this episode. The title "Mother and Child Reunion" comes from Paul Simon song of the same name, which in turn was inspired by the similarly named dish. It was the 700th episode of The Simpsons to have had a table read.

Television host George Stephanopoulos and statistician Nate Silver guest starred as themselves. Filmmaker Werner Herzog also guest starred as himself. He had previously appeared in the series as different characters.

== Reception ==
=== Viewing figures ===
In the United States, the episode earned a 0.34 rating and was watched live by 1.11 million viewers, which was the second-most watched show on Fox that night.

=== Critical response ===
Tony Sokol of Den of Geek gave the episode 2.5 stars out of 5, saying ""Mother and Child Reunion" is a retreaded tire which should have been left to cook longer at Springfield’s burning tire yard. This is a shame because The Simpsons have been doing well breathing new life into old premises this season."

Jesse Bereta of Bubbleblabber gave the episode a 6.5 out of 10. Bereta noticed that the focus of the series is shifting toward Lisa. He also stated that some plots were repeated, including the election of Lisa to President of the United States again. He also highlighted the performance of repeat guest star Werner Herzog.

John Witiw of CBR reported that the episode could be seen as an "alternate retelling of "Bart To The Future" (except with a more charitable future for Bart)".

The website Gabbing Geek describes the episode as a strange attempt to explain how Lisa became president without actually explaining anything while calling Bart an unlikely peacemaker. It is, in their view, an odd and not very entertaining episode.

The website The Avocado gave the episode a rating of 7.5 out of 10, praising the episode for its realistic portrayal of the relationship between Lisa and Marge, especially regarding the pressure parents feel on their children's future. It also appreciates the portrayal of Bart's character as a supportive sibling, although it negatively evaluates, for example, the long output of the oracle, unnecessarily taking up valuable episode time.

J.S. Gornael, a journalist for Collider, marked "Mother and Child Reunion" as the 7th best Simpsons episode set in the future.
