= Street King =

Street King may refer to

== Films ==
- The Street King, a 2002 film
- Street Kings, a 2008 film starring Keanu Reeves, Forest Whitaker, Hugh Laurie, Chris Evans, Common, and The Game

== Brands ==
- Street King (drink), a flavored energy drink

== Music ==
- Street King (album), a 2011 Trae tha Truth album
- Street Kings, a 2009 mixtape by Bossman (rapper)
