= 50 Cent =

American rapper and actor (born 1975)

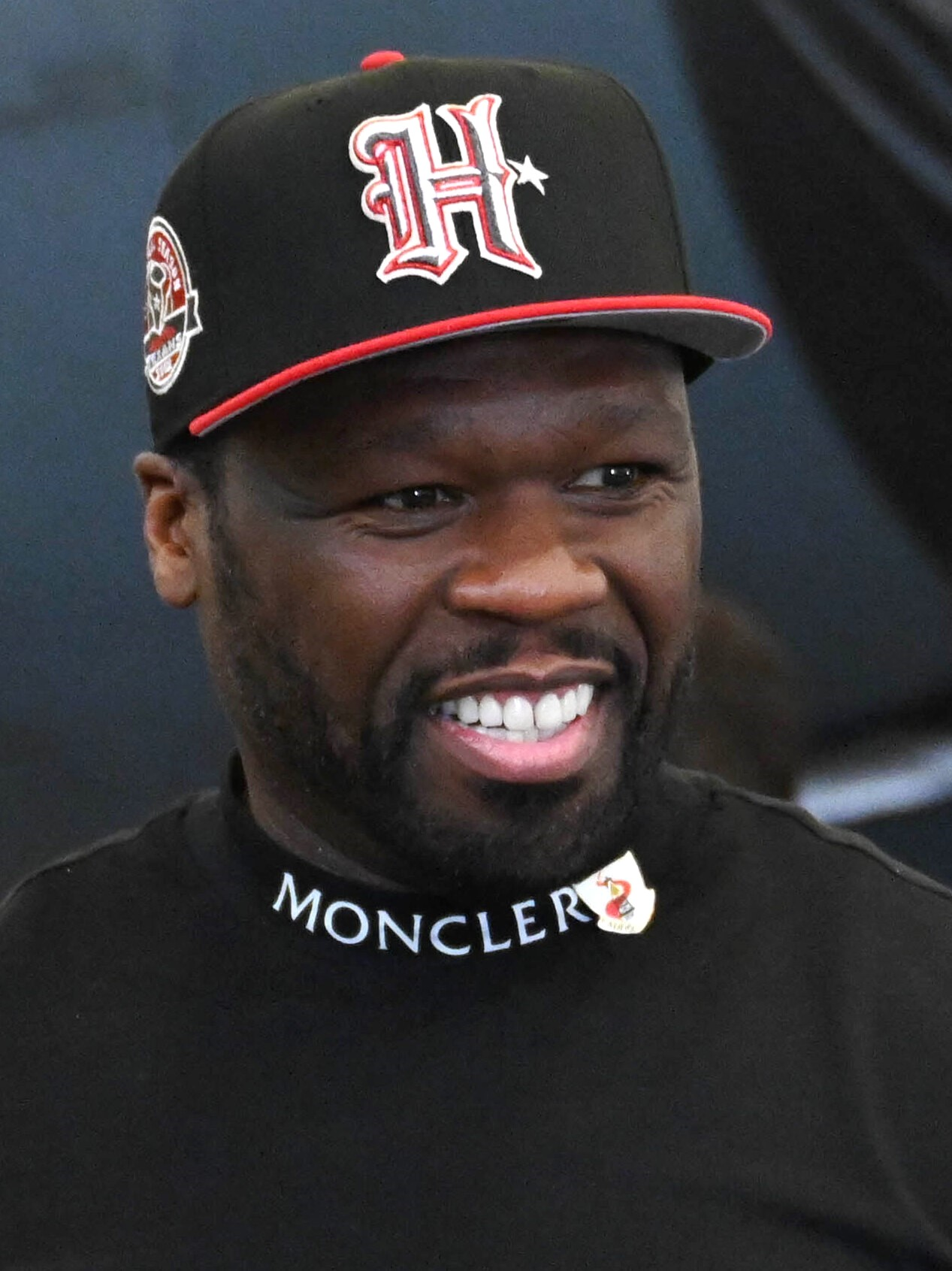
- 50 Cent in 2024
- Born: Curtis James Jackson III; July 6, 1975 (age 51); New York City, U.S.
- Occupations: Rapper; songwriter; actor; television producer; record executive; businessman
- Years active: 1996–present
- Organization: G-Unity Foundation
- Works: Albums; singles; group; records; clothing; books; multimedia; videography
- Television: 50 Central; 50 Cent: The Money and the Power; For Life; Power; The Oath
- Children: 2
- Awards: Full list
- Musical career
- Genres: East Coast hip-hop; gangsta rap
- Labels: Caroline; Capitol; G-Unit; Shady (former); Aftermath (former); Interscope (former); Violator; Universal; Columbia; Trackmasters; JMJ
- Formerly of: G-Unit
- Website: 50cent.com

Logo
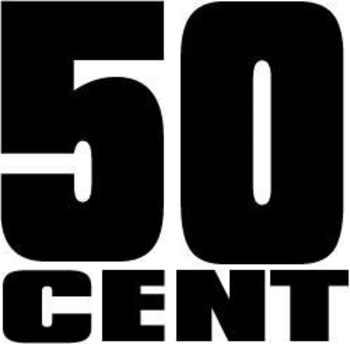

Curtis James Jackson III (born July 6, 1975), known professionally as 50 Cent, (Note: Sometimes abbreviated Fiddy, reflecting his own AAVE pronunciation of "50". On Late Night with Seth Meyers, he advised "white people who are trying to be cool" to pronounce "50" as "fifty" rather than "fiddy".) is an American rapper, actor, television producer, record executive, and businessman. Born in Queens, a borough of New York City, Jackson began pursuing a musical career in 1996. In 1999–2000, he recorded his debut album, Power of the Dollar, for Columbia Records. During a shooting in May 2000, he was struck by nine bullets, causing its release to be canceled and Jackson to be dropped from the label. His 2002 mixtape Guess Who's Back? was discovered by Detroit rapper Eminem, who signed Jackson to his label Shady Records (an imprint of Interscope Records) that year.

Jackson's debut studio album, Get Rich or Die Tryin' (2003), was released to critical acclaim and commercial success. Peaking atop the Billboard 200, it spawned the Billboard Hot 100-number one singles "In da Club" and "21 Questions" (featuring Nate Dogg), and received Multiple Platinum certification by the Recording Industry Association of America (RIAA). Also in 2003, he launched the record label G-Unit Records, namesake of a hip-hop group he formed two years earlier; the label's initial signees were its members, fellow East Coast rappers Lloyd Banks and Tony Yayo. His second album, The Massacre (2005), met with continued success, yielding his third number-one single, "Candy Shop" (featuring Olivia). He took a lighter, more commercially oriented approach with his third and fourth albums, Curtis (2007) and Before I Self Destruct (2009)—both of which witnessed critical and commercial declines—and aimed for a return to his roots with his fifth album, Animal Ambition (2014), which received mixed reviews. He has since focused on television and media, having executive-produced and starred in the television series Power (2014–2020), as well as its numerous spin-offs under his company G-Unit Films and Television Inc.

Jackson has sold over 30 million albums worldwide and earned several accolades, including a Grammy Award, a Primetime Emmy Award, 13 Billboard Music Awards, 6 World Music Awards, 3 American Music Awards, and 4 BET Awards. He starred in the semi-autobiographical film Get Rich or Die Tryin' (2005), which was critically panned. He also appeared in the war film Home of the Brave (2006) and the crime thriller Righteous Kill (2008). Billboard ranked Jackson 17th on its "50 Greatest Rappers" list in 2023, and named him the sixth top artist of the 2000s decade. Rolling Stone ranked Get Rich or Die Tryin' and "In da Club" in its lists of the "100 Best Albums of the 2000s" and "100 Best Songs of the 2000s" at numbers 37 and 13, respectively.

== Early life ==
Jackson was born in Queens, New York City, and raised in the South Jamaica neighborhood by his mother, Sabrina. He never met his father and does not know who he is. A drug dealer, Sabrina raised Jackson until she died in a fire when Jackson was eight years old. Jackson said in an interview that she was a lesbian. After his mother's death, Jackson was raised by his grandparents.

Jackson began boxing at about age 11, and when he was 14, a neighbor opened a boxing gym for local youth. "When I wasn't killing time in school, I was sparring in the gym or selling crack on the strip", he has said. He sold crack during primary school. "I was competitive in the ring and hip-hop is competitive too ... I think rappers condition themselves like boxers, so they all kind of feel like they're the champ."

At age 12, Jackson began dealing narcotics when his grandparents thought he was in after-school programs, and brought guns and drug money to school. In tenth grade, he was caught by metal detectors at Andrew Jackson High School: "I was embarrassed that I got arrested like that ... After I got arrested I stopped hiding it. I was telling my grandmother [openly], 'I sell drugs.'"

On June 29, 1994, Jackson was arrested for selling four vials of cocaine to an undercover police officer. He was arrested again three weeks later when police searched his home and found heroin, ten ounces of crack cocaine, and a starting pistol. Jackson was sentenced to three to nine years in prison, but served six months in a boot camp and earned his GED. He has said that he did not use cocaine himself. Jackson adopted the nickname "50 Cent" as a metaphor for change. The name was inspired by Kelvin Martin, a 1980s Brooklyn robber known as "50 Cent"; Jackson chose it "because it says everything I want it to say. I'm the same kind of person 50 Cent was. I provide for myself by any means."

== Career ==
=== 1996–2002: Rise to fame, shooting, and early mixtapes ===
Jackson began rapping in a friend's basement, using turntables to record over instrumentals. In 1996, a friend introduced him to Jam Master Jay of Run-DMC, who was establishing Jam Master Jay Records. Jay taught him to count bars, write choruses, structure songs, and make records. In 1997, A&R of Def Jam Irv Gotti turned down demo tapes by Jackson that Jay showed him for a potential record deal on the grounds that they were too similar to Jay-Z. Jackson's first appearance was on "React" with Onyx, from its 1998 album Shut 'Em Down, which Gotti was the A&R for. He credited Jam Master Jay for improving his ability to write hooks, and Jay produced Jackson's first (unreleased) album. In 1999, after Jackson left Jam Master Jay, the platinum-selling producers Trackmasters signed him to Columbia Records. They sent him to an upstate New York studio, where he produced 36 songs in two weeks; 18 were included on his 2000 album Power of the Dollar. Jackson founded Hollow Point Entertainment with former G-Unit member Bang 'Em Smurf.

Jackson's popularity began to grow after the successful, controversial underground single "How to Rob", which he wrote in a half-hour car ride to a studio. The track comically describes how he would rob famous artists. Jackson explained the song's rationale: "There's a hundred artists on that label, you gotta separate yourself from that group and make yourself relevant." Rappers Jay-Z, Kurupt, Sticky Fingaz, Big Pun, Wyclef Jean, and the Wu-Tang Clan responded to the track, and Nas invited Jackson to join him on his Nastradamus tour. Although "How to Rob" was intended to be released with "Thug Love" (with Destiny's Child), two days before he was scheduled to film the "Thug Love" video, Jackson was shot and hospitalized.

On May 24, 2000, Jackson was attacked by a gunman outside his grandmother's former home in South Jamaica. After getting into a friend's car, he was asked to return to the house to get some jewelry; his son was in the house, and his grandmother was in the front yard. Jackson returned to the car, and another car pulled up nearby; an assailant walked up and fired nine shots at close range with a 9mm handgun. Jackson was shot in the hand, arm, hip, both legs, chest, and left cheek. His facial wound resulted in a swollen tongue, the loss of a wisdom tooth and a slightly slurred voice; his friend was wounded in the hand. They were driven to a hospital, where Jackson spent 13 days. The alleged attacker, Darryl "Homicide" Baum, Mike Tyson's close friend and bodyguard, was killed three weeks later.

Jackson recalled the shooting: "It happens so fast that you don't even get a chance to shoot back .... I was scared the whole time ... I was looking in the rear-view mirror like, 'Oh shit, somebody shot me in the face! It burns, burns, burns.'" In his autobiography, From Pieces to Weight: Once upon a Time in Southside Queens, he wrote: "After I got shot nine times at close range and didn't die, I started to think that I must have a purpose in life ... How much more damage could that shell have done? Give me an inch in this direction or that one, and I'm gone." Jackson used a walker for six weeks and fully recovered after five months. When he left the hospital, he stayed in the Poconos with his girlfriend and son, and his workout regime helped him develop a muscular physique.

In the hospital, Jackson signed a publishing deal with Columbia Records before he was dropped from the label and blacklisted by the recording industry because of his song "Ghetto Qu'ran". Unable to work in a U.S. studio, he went to Canada. With business partner Sha Money XL, Jackson recorded over 30 songs for mixtapes to build a reputation. In a HitQuarters interview, Marc Labelle of Shady Records A&R said Jackson used the mixtape circuit to his advantage: "He took all the hottest beats from every artist and flipped them with better hooks. They then got into all the markets on the mixtapes and all the mixtape DJs were messing with them." Jackson's popularity increased, and in 2002 he released the mixtape Guess Who's Back?. He then released 50 Cent Is the Future backed by G-Unit, a mixtape revisiting material by Jay-Z and Raphael Saadiq.

=== 2002–2007: Mainstream breakthrough, Get Rich or Die Tryin, and The Massacre ===
"One of the things that excited me about Tupac was even if he was rhymin' the simplest words in the world, you felt like he meant it and it came from his heart. That's the thing with 50. That same aura. That's been missing since we lost Pac and Biggie. The authenticity, the realness behind it."

— Eminem about signing 50 Cent

In 2002, Eminem received Guess Who's Back? from Jackson's attorney, who was working with Eminem's manager, Paul Rosenberg. Impressed, Eminem invited Jackson to Los Angeles and introduced him to Dr. Dre. After signing a $1 million record deal, Jackson released the mixtape No Mercy, No Fear. It featured one new track, "Wanksta", which appeared on Eminem's 8 Mile soundtrack. Jackson was also signed by Violator Management and Sha Money XL's Money Management Group. Jackson released his debut album, Get Rich or Die Tryin' (described by AllMusic as "probably the most hyped debut album by a rap artist in about a decade"), in February 2003. Rolling Stone noted its "dark synth grooves, buzzy keyboards and a persistently funky bounce", with Jackson complementing the production in "an unflappable, laid-back flow". It debuted at number one on the Billboard 200, selling 872,000 copies in its first four days. The lead single, "In da Club" (noted by The Source for its "blaring horns, funky organs, guitar riffs and sparse hand claps"), set a Billboard record as the most listened-to song in radio history within a week.

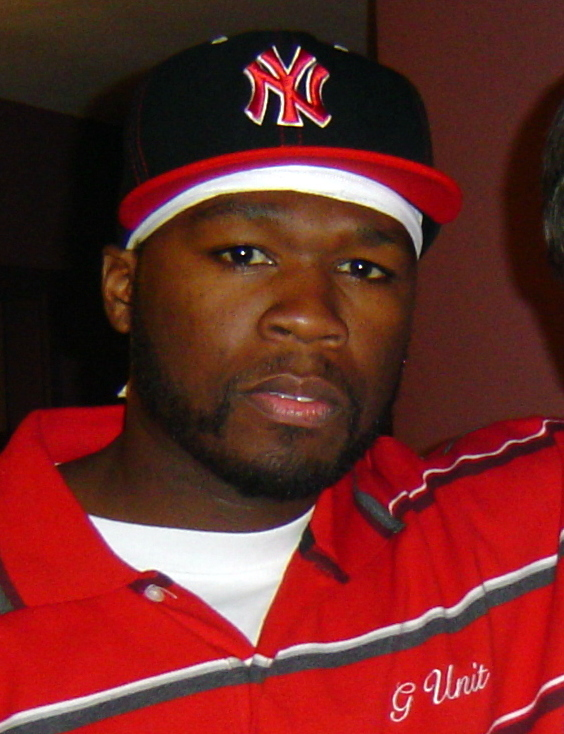
50 Cent in 2006

Interscope began funding and distributing for Jackson's label, G-Unit Records, in 2003. He signed Lloyd Banks, Tony Yayo, and Young Buck as members of G-Unit, and The Game was later signed in a joint venture with Dr. Dre's Aftermath Entertainment. G-Unit Records replaced Jackson's previous imprint, Rotten Apple Entertainment. 50 Cent executive produced Lloyd Banks's 2004 debut studio album, The Hunger for More, which achieved platinum status in the U.S. Jackson also contributed vocals to Banks's hit single "On Fire". In March 2005, Jackson's second commercial album, The Massacre, sold 1.14 million copies in its first four days (the highest in an abbreviated sales cycle) and was number one on the Billboard 200 for six weeks. He was the first solo artist with three singles in the Billboard top five in the same week with "Candy Shop", "Disco Inferno" and "How We Do". According to Rolling Stone, "50's secret weapon is his singing voice—the deceptively amateur-sounding tenor croon that he deploys on almost every chorus". Jackson's semi-autobiographical film Get Rich or Die Tryin', in which he starred, was released in November 2005. His video game, 50 Cent: Bulletproof was released the same month. He portrays himself and provides his likeness and voice in the game, which features music from his first two studio albums.

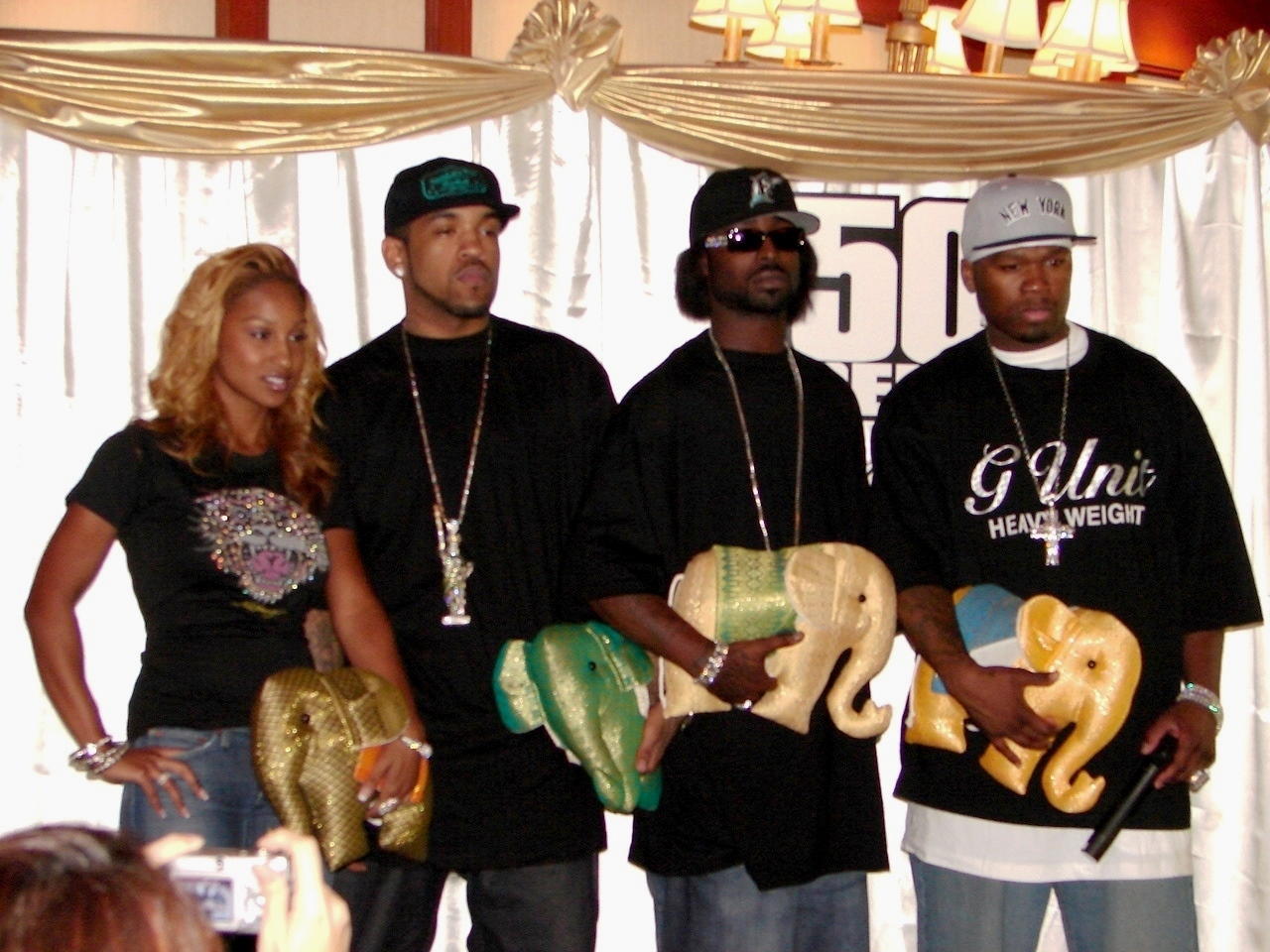
Olivia, Lloyd Banks, Young Buck, and 50 Cent (left to right) in Bangkok, February 2006

After The Game's departure, Jackson signed Olivia and rap veterans Mobb Deep to G-Unit Records, and later Spider Loc, M.O.P., 40 Glocc, and Young Hot Rod. All eventually left the label. Jackson expressed interest in working with rappers other than G-Unit, such as Lil' Scrappy of BME, LL Cool J of Def Jam, Mase of Bad Boy, and Freeway of Roc-A-Fella, and recorded with several.

=== 2007–2010: Curtis, sales battle with Kanye West, and Before I Self Destruct ===
In September 2007, Jackson released his third album, Curtis, inspired by his life before Get Rich or Die Tryin'. It debuted at number two on the Billboard 200, selling 691,000 copies during its first week. It sold behind Kanye West's Graduation, released the same day; the outcome of this highly publicized sales battle between Jackson and West has been accredited to the commercial decline of the gangsta rap and "bling era" style that previously dominated mainstream hip-hop.

In January 2008, a New York attorney's report disclosed how musical artists like 50 Cent or Timbaland had been allegedly purchasing and consuming performance-enhacing drugs. Some of the artists mentioned in the report subsequently denied ever having consumed anabolic steroids.

That same year, 50 Cent co-signed the underground rap group Bang Bang Boogie, which consisted of Mysonne, Cuban Link, Lord Tariq, Hocus 45th and S-One, giving them his stamp of approval. The group released the mixtapes The Machine, Vol. 1 and X-Files: No Mercy For The Weak in that same year before disbanding shortly due to Hocus and S-One being falsely incarcerated for gang-related crimes. The group was known for representing The Bronx and for their beef with Fat Joe as they dissed him on songs such as "High Blood Pressure" and "Bang Out".

On September 10, 2008, episode of Total Request Live, Jackson said his fourth studio album, Before I Self Destruct, would be "done and released in November". He released "Ok, You're Right", produced by Dr. Dre for Before I Self Destruct, on May 18, 2009, and was scheduled to appear in a fall 2009 episode of VH1's Behind the Music. On September 3, 2009, Jackson posted a video for the Soundkillers' Phoenix- produced track, "Flight 187", introducing his mixtape and book (The 50th Law). The song, with lyrics inspiring speculation about tension between Jackson and Jay-Z, was a bonus track on the iTunes version of Before I Self Destruct. Before I Self Destruct was released on November 9, 2009, and debuted at number 5 on the Billboard 200, giving 50 Cent his fourth consecutive top 5 album in the U.S.

=== 2010–2015: New musical directions, new business ventures, and Animal Ambition ===
In a Contactmusic.com interview, Jackson said he was working on a Eurodance album, Black Magic, inspired by European nightclubs: "First they played hip-hop which suddenly changed to uptempo songs, known as Eurodance". He later said he had changed his next album to The Return of the Heartless Monster after writing different material when he returned home from the Invitation Tour in 2010, shelving Black Magic. On September 3, Jackson supported Eminem on his and Jay-Z's The Home & Home Tour, performing "Crack A Bottle" with Eminem and Dr. Dre amid rumors of tension between Jackson and Dre.

He "recorded 20 songs to a whole different album concept" before putting them aside, wanting his new album to have the "aggression" of Get Rich or Die Tryin'. Jackson tweeted that the album was "80 percent done" and fans could expect it in the summer of 2011. It was ultimately delayed a year due to disagreements with Interscope Records, with Jackson saying that he would release it in November 2011 with a different title than Black Magic. Eminem would appear on the album, and Jackson said he was working with new producers such as Boi-1da and Alex da Kid. Cardiak, who produced Lloyd Banks's "Start It Up", confirmed that he produced a song for the album.

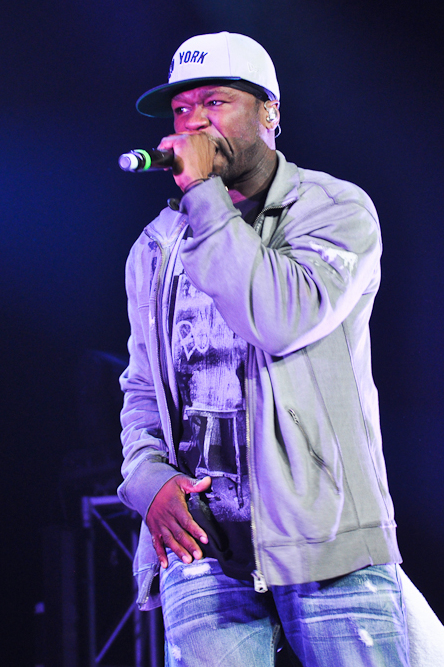
50 Cent performing in 2011

Jackson released a song, "Outlaw", from his fifth album online on June 16, 2011. The single, produced by Cardiak, was released on iTunes on July 19 (although Jackson tweeted that it was not the album's first single). Jackson planned to write a semi-autobiographical young-adult novel about bullying, different from his previous books, which focused on his life and the rules of power. According to the book's publisher, the first-person novel (about a 13-year-old schoolyard bully "who finds redemption as he faces what he's done") was scheduled for publication in January 2012.

In a series of tweets, Jackson said that the delay of his fifth album was due to disagreements with Interscope Records, later suggesting that it would be released in November 2011 with his headphone line (SMS by 50). He speculated to MTV News about not renewing his five-album contract with Interscope: "I don't know ... It will all be clear in the negotiations following me turning this actual album in. And, of course, the performance and how they actually treat the work will determine whether you still want to stay in that position or not."

On June 20, 2011, Jackson announced the release of Before I Self Destruct II after his fifth album. Although he planned to shoot a video for the album's lead single, "I'm On It", on June 26, it was never filmed. Jackson told Shade45, "I did four songs in Detroit with Eminem. I did two with Just Blaze, a Boi-1da joint, and I did something with Alex da Kid. We made two that are definite singles and the other two are the kinds of records that we been making, more aimed at my core audience, more aggressive, more of a different kind of energy to it." He released "Street King Energy Track #7" in September 2011 to promote Street King, his charity-based energy drink. An announcement that Jackson was shooting a video for "Girls Go Wild", the fifth-album lead single featuring Jeremih, was made on September 28, 2011.

Jackson's fifth album, Street King Immortal, was first scheduled for a summer 2012 release but postponed to November 13. Disagreements with Interscope Records about its release and promotion led to its temporary cancellation. Its first promo single, "New Day" with Dr. Dre and Alicia Keys, was released on July 27. The song was produced by Dr. Dre, mixed by Eminem, and written by 50 Cent, Alicia Keys, Royce da 5'9" and Dr. Dre. A solo version by Keys was leaked by her husband, Swizz Beatz. "My Life", the album's second promo single (with Eminem and Maroon 5 lead singer Adam Levine), was released on November 26, 2012.

In January 2014, Jackson said he planned to release Animal Ambition in the first quarter of the year, followed by Street King Immortal. On February 20, he left Shady Records, Aftermath Entertainment, and Interscope, signing with Caroline and Capitol Music Group. According to Jackson, although he owed Interscope another album, he was released from his contract because of his friendship with Eminem and Dr. Dre: "I'm a special case and situation. It's also because of the leverage of having the strong relationships with Eminem and Dr. Dre. They don't want me to be uncomfortable. They value our friendship to the point that they would never want [to jeopardize] it over that little bit of money."

That day, he announced that Animal Ambition would be released on June 3 and released its first track. The song, "Funeral", was released with a video on Forbes.com. Produced by Jake One, it is a continuation of "50 Bars" from a previous album; two more tracks were scheduled for release on March 18. At South by Southwest, Jackson performed "Hold On" from the new album. That song and "Don't Worry 'Bout It" were released with accompanying videos on March 18. According to Jackson, prosperity would be a theme of the album: "This project, I had to search for a concept, a really good concept, in my perspective, and that was prosperity. I outlined all the things that would be a part of prosperity, positive and negative [for Animal Ambition]."

Animal Ambition debuted at number four on the U.S. Billboard 200, giving 50 Cent his fifth consecutive top-five album in the country, while also debuting at number one on Billboard's Independent Albums chart.

=== 2015–2021: Street King Immortal, bankruptcy, and departure from Interscope ===
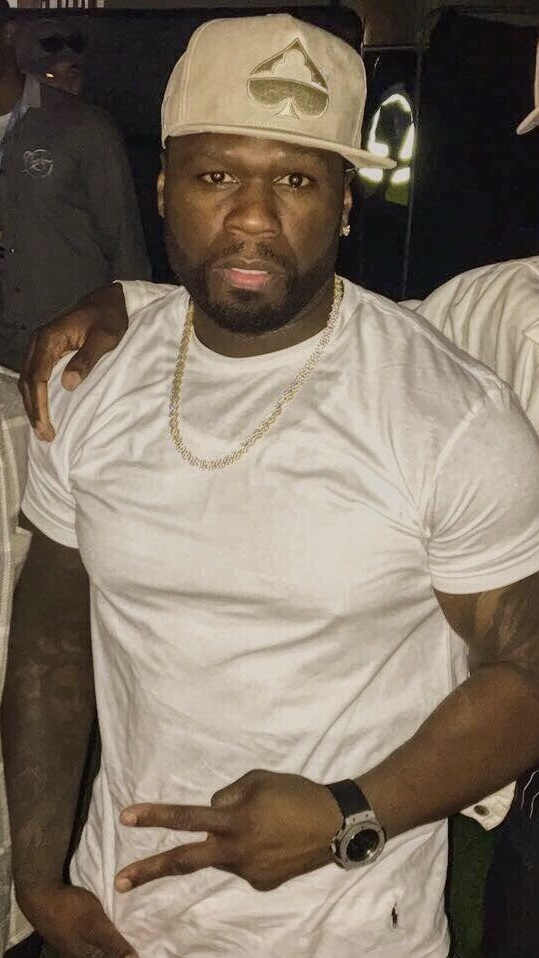
50 Cent in 2017

On May 14, 2015, Jackson said in an interview that the first single from Street King Immortal would be previewed on Memorial Day weekend and likely be released in June. He released "Get Low" on May 20 as the intended first single from his sixth studio album, Street King Immortal. The song, produced by Remo the Hitmaker, features vocals from 2 Chainz, T.I., and Jeremih. He announced bankruptcy on July 13, 2015.

On March 31, 2017, Interscope Records released 50 Cent's final album for the label, the greatest-hits album Best Of.

In 2019, 50 Cent was featured on English singer-songwriter Ed Sheeran's fourth studio album, No.6 Collaborations Project with American rapper Eminem, on "Remember the Name".

In 2020, Jackson stepped in as executive producer for late rapper Pop Smoke's debut album, Shoot for the Stars, Aim for the Moon, having been one of Pop Smoke's biggest inspirations. The album was released on July 3, 2020, to nationwide commercial acclaim. Jackson curated the album, desiring to finish it after Pop had died. He contacted many of the artists involved, and also features on one of the album tracks, "The Woo". The Woo also features vocals by Roddy Ricch.

In 2020, it was reported that Jackson was producing two television series for Starz, an anthology about hip-hop and a biographical drama about sports agent Nicole Lynn.

In 2021, he became one of the headliners of the music festival Golden Sand in Riviera Maya.

In a July 2021 interview with The Independent, 50 Cent said he had decided to shelve his Street King Immortal album after it spent a decade in development hell and planned to release a completely new project.

=== 2021–present: Focusing on acting and media production, Super Bowl LVI halftime show performance ===
In May 2021, Jackson moved to Houston. This was thought to be for lower taxes, no income tax, the rapper scene, and other ventures such as writing new screenplays. Jackson, Horizon United Group, and Houston Independent School District began a partnership on a project to help high school students learn the business skills. While living in Houston, Jackson worked on screenplays for new crime shows.

In August 2021, he was confirmed to be starring in the film Expend4bles; it was released on September 22, 2023. The film was a critical and commercial failure, grossing $51 million against a $100 million production budget.

In September 2021, Starz began airing BMF, a biographical series based on true events, depicting two brothers in Detroit (Demetrius "Big Meech" and Terry "Southwest T" Flenory, co-founders of the Black Mafia Family) who ran a drug trafficking and money laundering operation from the mid-1980s until 2005. Jackson is the executive producer of the show. He also performed the show's theme song, "Wish Me Luck", alongside Charlie Wilson, Moneybagg Yo, and Snoop Dogg.

On February 13, 2022, 50 Cent was a surprise performer in the Super Bowl LVI halftime show, receiving a Primetime Emmy Award for Outstanding Variety Special (Live) in September for the performance.

From December 2024 to January 2025, Jackson embarked on his Las Vegas residency, 50 Cent: In da Club, which had been announced in October. He also announced plans to executive-produce Sean Combs: The Reckoning for Netflix, a documentary centered on the sexual misconduct allegations against hip-hop entrepreneur Sean Combs. It was released in December 2025. In January 2025, Den of Thieves 2: Pantera was released, a sequel to the 2018 film. Jackson, who starred in the 2018 film, executive produced the sequel alongside former co-star O'Shea Jackson Jr., who reprised his role. Jackson is now set to appear in the film Street Fighter.

== Artistry ==
Jackson cites Boogie Down Productions, Big Daddy Kane, The Juice Crew, EPMD and KRS-One as his rapping influences, while citing LL Cool J as an inspiration behind his writing of "21 Questions". He has also said he was influenced by Nas, Rakim, and The Notorious B.I.G. while working on Animal Ambition.

== Business ventures ==
Jackson has had a highly successful business career. He is financially invested in a highly diversified variety of industries. Jackson is now involved in artist and talent management, record, television, and film production, footwear, apparel, fragrances, liquor, video games, mobile apps, book publishing, headphones, along with health drinks and dietary supplements. His broad business and investment portfolio contains investments in a variety of sectors including real estate, financial market investments, mining, boxing promotion, vodka, fragrances, consumer electronics and fashion.

He established his own record label G-Unit Records in 2003 following his mainstream success. In November 2003, he signed a five-year deal with Reebok to distribute a G-Unit Sneakers line for his G-Unit Clothing Company. In an interview, Jackson said his businesses had a habit of doing well as he saw all of his ventures both past and present as revolving around his alter ego.

Jackson has also started a book publishing imprint, G-Unit Books on January 4, 2007, at the Time Warner Building in New York. He has written a number of books including a memoir, From Pieces To Weight in 2005 which sold 73,000 copies in hardcover and 14,000 copies in paperback; a crime novel and a book with Robert Greene titled The 50th Law, an urban take on The 48 Laws of Power. In November 2011, Jackson released 50 Cent's Playground, a young adult fiction novel about a bullied, violent boy and his gay mother.

One of Jackson's first business ventures was a partnership with Glacéau to create an enhanced water drink called Formula 50. In October 2004, Jackson became a beverage investor when he was given a minority share in the company in exchange for becoming a spokesperson after learning that he was a fan of the beverage. The health conscious Jackson noted that he first learned of the product while at a gym in Los Angeles, and stated that "they do such a good job making water taste good". After becoming a minority shareholder and celebrity spokesperson, Jackson worked with the company to create a new grape flavored "Formula 50" variant of VitaminWater and mentioned the drinks in various songs and interviews. In 2007, Coca-Cola purchased Glacéau for $4.1 billion and, according to Forbes, Jackson, a minority shareholder, earned $100 million from the deal after taxes.

Though he no longer has an equity stake in the company, Jackson continues to act as a spokesperson for VitaminWater, supporting the product including singing about it at the BET Awards and expressing his excitement that the company continues to allow his input on products. He joined Right Guard to introduce a body spray (Pure 50 RGX) and endorsed Magic Stick condoms, planning to donate part of their proceeds to increasing HIV awareness. Jackson signed a multi-year deal with Steiner Sports to sell his memorabilia, and announced plans for a dietary-supplement company in conjunction with his film Spectacular Regret in August 2007.

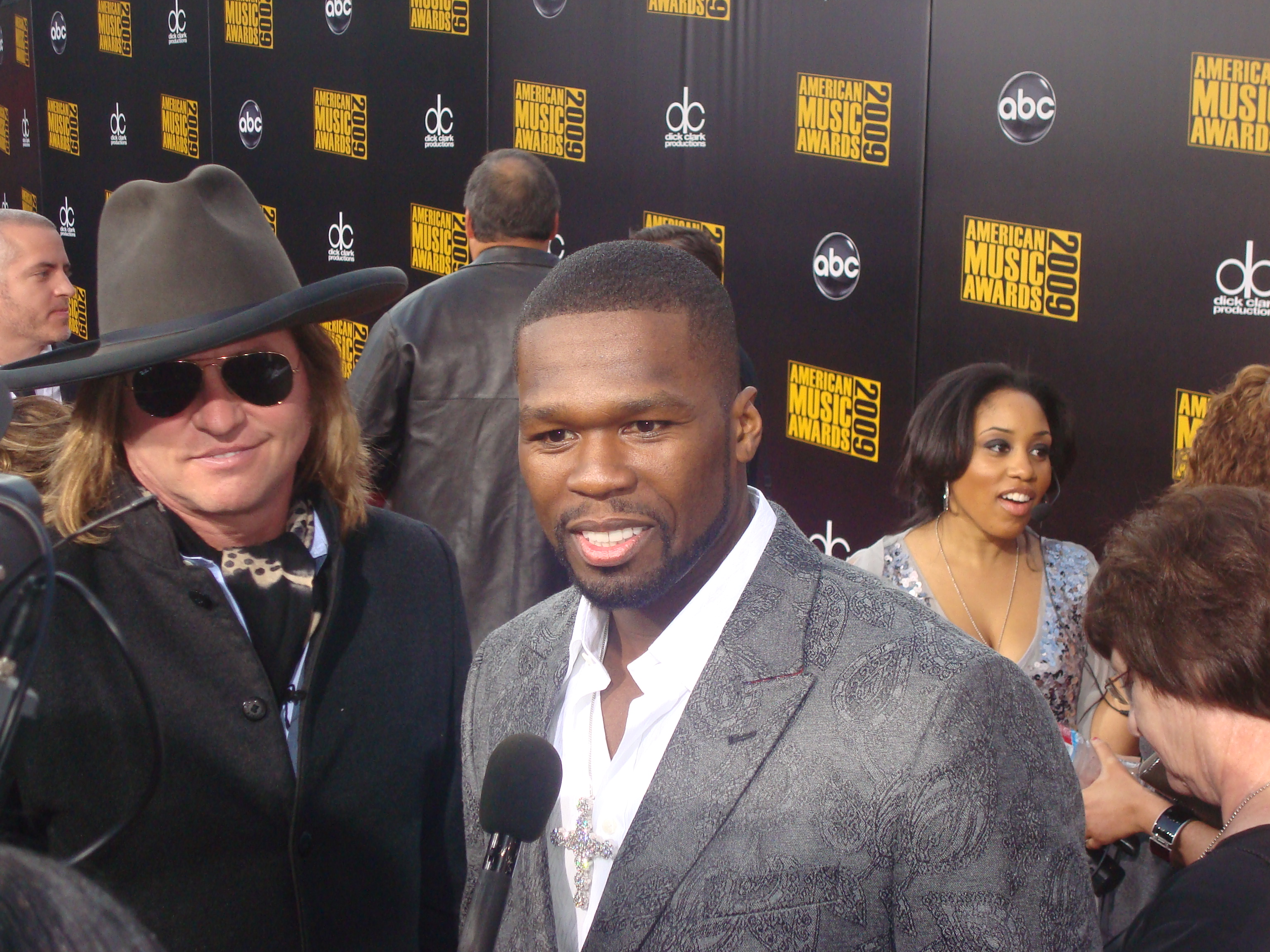
50 Cent with Val Kilmer at the 2009 American Music Awards

Jackson has founded two film production companies: G-Unit Films in 2003 and Cheetah Vision in 2008. Cheetah Vision produces low-budget action thrillers for foreign film markets across the world. When G-Unit Films folded, he focused on Cheetah Vision and the company obtained $200 million in funding in 2010. In 2010, Jackson revived G-Unit Films, renaming it G-Unit Film and Television, Inc. The company had joint ventures with Will Packer's production company, Will Packer Productions, and Universal Television. In over 18 months, Jackson sold projects to six different television networks. Among them was the Courtney A. Kemp-created Power, a crime drama in which he co-starred as Kanan Stark and served as an executive producer. Power debuted on Starz on June 7, 2014, and ended on February 9, 2020, after six seasons. He signed a two-year contract with representation from the Agency for the Performing Arts. Ratings have been a success for Starz, with the second-season premiere being the highest with 1.43 million viewers. Jackson is also the executive producer of three of the series' spin-offs, Power Book II: Ghost, Power Book III: Raising Kanan and Power Book IV: Force. Offices for G-Unit Film and Television (also known as G-Unit Studios) are headquartered in Shreveport, Louisiana, as part of a 45-year lease agreement with the state.

In 2002, Jackson filed an application with the United States Patent and Trademark Office to register the term "50 Cent" as a trademark for clothing, sound recordings, and live performances. The application was published in 2003, and registration issued in 2004. He has since filed for additional trademark registrations.

In July 2011, Jackson launched a philanthropic initiative to provide food for one billion starving people in Africa by 2016, joining Pure Growth Partners to introduce Street King. A portion of the proceeds from each Street King purchase would be used to provide a daily meal to an underprivileged child. The partnership coincides with Jackson's goal to feed a billion people in Africa during the next five years. "50 Cent and I share a common vision: to address the world's problems through smart and sustainable business models," said Chris Clarke, founder and CEO of Pure Growth Partners. "With the rampant starvation in Africa and hunger afflicting children worldwide, we need socially responsible businesses that affect real change now more than ever." Jackson said, "I'm inspired by Clarke's vision and innovative approaches to tackling serious issues. It's our mission with Street King to really change children's lives around the world." In 2011, he founded SMS Audio, a consumer-electronics company selling Street by 50 headphones, pledging to donate a portion of their sales to charity. In April 2015, SMS announced new co-branding deals with Reebok and Marvel. It added those to existing partnerships with Walt Disney Parks, Lucasfilm's Star Wars, and Intel.

In 2014, Jackson became a minority shareholder in Effen Vodka, a brand of vodka produced in the Netherlands, when he invested undisclosed amount in the company, Sire Spirits, LLC. He endorsed the product via his live concert performances and social media. The rapper was asked to take part in two promotional bottle signings, one in Oak Creek and another in Sun Prairie. Jackson made an appearance at Liquor Warehouse in Syracuse, New York on April 25, 2015, where he reportedly sold 1,400 bottles (277 gallons) of Jackson's signature liquor brand. Liquor Warehouse's owner, George Angeloro, reportedly stocked 300 cases (1,800 bottles or 357 gallons) of Effen Vodka, which sells for $30 a bottle, prior to the event.

In December 2014, Jackson signed a $78 million deal with FRIGO Revolution Wear, a luxury underwear brand. The joint venture is partnered between Jackson, basketball player Carmelo Anthony, baseball player Derek Jeter and Mathias Ingvarsson, the former president of mattress company Tempur-Pedic. Jackson became the chief fashion designer for the brands single pair of Frigo boxers. In April 2015, Jackson mulled investing in Jamaica, exploring foreign investment opportunities on the island when he met with some local officials and had ongoing discussions on investment opportunities in the Montego Bay resort area.

=== Investments ===
Over the years, Jackson invested his earnings from music and celebrity endorsements in an array of privately controlled companies, real estate, and stocks and bonds. A portion of his investments lost value during the 2008 financial crisis. In December 2008, he told the Canadian press that he had been affected by the recession, losing several million dollars in the stock market. Unable to sell his Connecticut mansion, Jackson postponed Before I Self-Destruct due to the severity of the economic downturn.

His Farmington mansion at 50 Poplar Hill Drive that he tried to sell for years filed for bankruptcy in Connecticut in 2015. Its asking price in 2012 was $10 million but it was valued at $8.3 million in 2015. He first tried to sell the house in 2007 for $18.5 million, and dropped the price several times in the next five years, when it was on and off the market.

In January 2011, Jackson reportedly made $10 million after using Twitter to promote a marketing company of which he was a shareholder. His endorsements company G Unit Brands Inc. controlled 12.9% of H&H Imports, a parent company of TV Goods, the firm responsible for marketing his range of headphones, Sleek by 50 Cent. Jackson bought stock in the company on November 30, 2010, a week after it offered buyers 180 million shares at $0.17 each. Jackson later made a stock recommendation on Twitter, causing its share price to rise from $0.04 to nearly $0.50, closing on Monday at $0.39. Jackson was later investigated by the Securities and Exchange Commission for breaching securities laws, as his tweet may have constituted insider trading with a pump and dump investment strategy.

In 2013, Jackson became a minority investor in Hang w/, a live video broadcasting mobile app used by dozens of celebrities to broadcast their daily activities and chat with fans. The app was downloaded more than 1 million times after launching in March 2013 and had more than 1 million users in February 2015. Other minority celebrity investors were former NFL player Terrell Owens and record producer Timbaland.

=== Mining and heavy metals ===
In 2008, Jackson visited a platinum, palladium and iridium mine shaft in South Africa, and met with South African billionaire Patrice Motsepe in talks of purchasing an equity stake in the mine. After meeting with Motsepe, Jackson considered purchasing equity in the mine and launching his own line of 50 Cent branded platinum.

=== Boxing promotion ===
On July 21, 2012, Jackson became a licensed boxing promoter when he formed his new company, TMT (The Money Team). Licensed to promote in New York, he was in the process of being licensed in Nevada (where most major fights are held in the U.S.). A former amateur boxer, Jackson signed gold medalist and former featherweight champion Yuriorkis Gamboa and middleweight Olympic medalist Andre Dirrell. On July 29, he and the boxer Floyd Mayweather Jr. signed IBF featherweight champion Billy Dib. They unveiled plans to challenge the box-office dominance of mixed martial arts and change the landscape of boxing with TMT Promotions. Boxer Zab Judah also expressed interest in making a deal with Jackson. In December, Mayweather and Jackson parted company, with Jackson taking over the promotion company and founding SMS Promotions with Gamboa, Dirrell, Dib, James Kirkland, Luis Olivares, and Donte Strayhorn in his stable.

=== Bankruptcy ===
On July 13, 2015, Jackson filed for Chapter 11 bankruptcy protection in the U.S. Bankruptcy Court for the District of Connecticut with a debt of $32,509,549.91. On July 17, the Court issued an order allowing a creditor to proceed with the punitive damages phase of a trial against Jackson in a New York state court in connection with the alleged release of a private video. His assets were listed as between $10 million and $50 million in his bankruptcy petition, though he testified under oath that he was worth $4.4 million. He said that he had between $10 million and $50 million in debt and the same amount in assets. Later in the week, Jackson's bankruptcy lawyers elucidated through the court documents that legal fees and judgments exceeding $20 million over the past year were the primary cause of the filing.

His filings listed 32 entities in which he had a stake. The bankruptcy came days after a jury ordered him to pay $5 million to Rick Ross's ex-girlfriend Lastonia Leviston for invading her privacy by posting online a sex tape of her and another man. In addition, Jackson lost a dispute over a failed business deal involving his Sleek headphones, where Jackson invested more than $2 million. An ex-partner accused Jackson of stealing the design of the "Sleek by 50" headphones, prompting a judge to award the partner more than $17.2 million. His Connecticut bankruptcy filing stated that he owned seven cars valued at more than $500,000, including a 2010 Rolls-Royce and a 1966 Chevrolet Coupe. His monthly expenses of $108,000 included $5,000 for gardening. He reported a monthly income of $185,000, mainly from royalties and his external businesses and investments. The court filing said he also owed money to his stylist, his barber, and his fitness coach.

Other details in the bankruptcy documents included information about two deals that sold the right to collect royalties of on-air play of his music. Half the rights to his portfolio were sold to the British independent music publishing company Kobalt Music Group for $3 million and the other half for another $3 million, with the sales of his albums allowing Jackson to own the rights to the master recordings while paying only for distribution. Zeisler & Zeisler, a Bridgeport law firm, represented 50 Cent in the bankruptcy, which resulted in Jackson filing a $75 million lawsuit against his own lawyers. He said his lawyers did a terrible job of representing him, specifically citing the fallout of his failed venture with Sleek Audio headphones. He accused Garvey Schubert Barer, a Wall Street law firm, of failing to "employ the requisite knowledge and skill necessary to confront the circumstances of the case".

=== Corporate positions ===
- G-Unity Foundation Inc. – Founder
- SMS Audio – CEO, founder
- SK Energy – Founder
- SMS Promotions – CEO, founder
- Sire Spirits – Owner
- Effen Vodka – Former minority shareholder

== Personal life ==
50 Cent has said his life philosophy since his shooting has been "When your time comes, you go. I think that comes from God." Despite numerous songs that reference drug and alcohol use and his ownership of Branson Cognac, Jackson remains a teetotaler, citing a bad experience with alcohol as his main reason.

Forbes noted Jackson's wealth in 2007, ranking him second behind Jay-Z in the rap industry. In 2003 he purchased, for $4.1 million, a Farmington, Connecticut mansion formerly owned by ex-boxer Mike Tyson. Jackson listed the mansion for sale in 2007 at $18.5 million to move closer to his son, who lived on Long Island at the time. In 2019, the mansion sold for $2.9 million, with $1 million donated to tax-deducted charities.

The mayor of Bridgeport, Connecticut, declared October 12, 2007 "50 Cent Curtis Jackson Day", honoring him with a proclamation and a key to the city. One of Jackson's New York homes, purchased in January 2007 for $2.4 million and the center of a lawsuit between Jackson and Shaniqua Tompkins, caught fire on May 31, 2008, while he was filming in Louisiana.

=== Family and relationships ===
On October 13, 1997, Jackson's girlfriend, Shaniqua Tompkins, gave birth to son Marquise. In 2009 Tompkins sued Jackson for $50 million, saying he promised to take care of her for life. The suit, with 15 causes of action, was dismissed by a judge who called it "an unfortunate tale of a love relationship gone sour". The two have had a dispute for years and taken it to social media many times.

Marquise's birth changed Jackson's outlook on life: "When my son came into my life, my priorities changed, because I wanted to have the relationship with him that I didn't have with my father." He credited his son for inspiring his career and being the "motivation to go in a different direction". Despite this, the two have endured a fractured relationship that began when Jackson and Tompkins separated in 2008. Their feud has been taken to social media numerous times, including in 2020 when Jackson wrote that he "used to" love his son. Jackson has a tattoo "Marquise" with an axe on his right biceps ("The axe is 'cause I'm a warrior. I don't want him to be one, though"), and has "50", "Southside" and "Cold World" on his back: "I'm a product of that environment. It's on my back, though, so it's all behind me".

In 2003, Jackson dated actress Vivica A. Fox for eight months.

Jackson dated model Daphne Joy and had his second son, Sire Jackson, with her, on September 1, 2012. At age two, Sire modeled for Kidz Safe, a headphone brand for kids, earning $700,000.

In 2024, in an Instagram post promoting his Cognac brand, Jackson wrote that he had been practicing celibacy: "My new idea is so big, I don't have time to be distracted I'm practicing abstinence, I have been meditating and focusing on my goals." Jackson clarified his stance on The Late Show with Stephen Colbert, saying, "when you calm down you can focus. ... I've been good to me." He also opened up about his decision to not marry, saying, "I'm safe. I'm not a happy hostage. I'm here. I'm free. I made some mistakes, just not that one. ... I want someone I can love in my life too, just not right now, I'm fine."

=== Political views ===
In 2005, Jackson supported President George W. Bush after rapper Kanye West criticized Bush for a slow response to the victims of Hurricane Katrina. Had his felony convictions not prevented him from voting, he said, he would have voted for Bush. Jackson later said that Bush "has less compassion than the average human. By all means, I don't aspire to be like George Bush." In September 2007, he told Time that although he would not endorse a candidate in 2008, he "liked Hillary [Clinton]".

Six months later, Jackson told MTV News that he had switched his support to Barack Obama after hearing him speak but had lost interest in politics. Asked his opinion of Obama's 2012 endorsement of same-sex marriage, Jackson said, "I'm for it ... I've encouraged same-sex activities. I've engaged in fetish areas a couple times." He had been criticized for anti-gay comments in the past.

Jackson endorsed Democratic nominee Hillary Clinton in the run-up to the 2016 U.S. presidential election. He rejected an offer of $500,000 from the Donald Trump campaign to make an appearance on Trump's behalf. In 2020, he endorsed Trump due to his dislike of Joe Biden's tax plans. A week later, he retracted his endorsement, writing on Twitter, "Fuck Donald Trump, I never liked him", and endorsed Biden.

In June 2025, Jackson posted on Instagram a video of New York City mayoral candidate Zohran Mamdani explaining his tax policy, writing: "I'm not feeling this plan no. I will give him $258,750 and a first class one way ticket away from NY. I'm telling Trump what he said too!"

== Legal issues ==
On June 29, 1994, Jackson was arrested for selling four vials of cocaine to an undercover police officer. He was arrested again three weeks later, when police searched his home and found heroin, ten ounces of crack cocaine and a starter's pistol. Although Jackson was sentenced to three to nine years in prison, he served six months in a boot camp (where he earned his high-school equivalency diploma). According to him, he did not use cocaine.

Jackson and four members of his entourage were arrested shortly before 2 a.m. on December 31, 2002, when police found a .25-caliber handgun and a .45-caliber pistol in a parked car (which they searched due to its tinted windows) outside a Manhattan nightclub. The rapper was charged with two counts of criminal possession of a weapon.

Jackson was sentenced to two years' probation on July 22, 2005, for a May 2004 incident, when he was charged with three counts of assault and battery after jumping into an audience when he was hit by a water bottle.

=== Lawsuits ===
==== Use of image ====
Jackson filed a lawsuit against an advertising company, Traffix of Pearl River, New York, on July 21, 2007, for using his image in a promotion he said threatened his safety. He was alerted by a staff member to an Internet advertisement on a Myspace page. According to court documents, the advertisement had a cartoon image of the rapper with "Shoot the rapper and you will win $5000 or five ring tones guaranteed". Although the ad did not use his name, the image allegedly resembled him and suggested that he endorsed the product. The lawsuit, calling the ad a "vile, tasteless and despicable" use of Jackson's image which "quite literally call[ed] for violence against him", sought unspecified punitive damages and a permanent injunction against the use of his image without permission.

==== Use of name ====
In 2008, Jackson sued Taco Bell over an ad campaign that used his name without permission, in which it invited him to change his name for one day from 50 Cent to 79 Cent, 89 Cent, or 99 Cent, in line with pricing for some of its items, and they would donate $10,000 to the charity of his choice. The case was settled out of court in his favor in November 2009.

==== Janitor incident ====
While walking through Cincinnati/Northern Kentucky International Airport in May 2016, Jackson harassed and insulted a janitor at the airport, accusing him of being under the influence. The janitor was a hearing-impaired, autistic teenager named Andrew Farrell. The parents of the janitor had seen the viral video as disrespect and wanted to sue Jackson for his action against their child. The lawsuit was originally over one million dollars, but the parents settled for a $100,000 donation to Autism Speaks and his apology.

==== Bamba sample ====
In 2016, a judge declared that Brandon Parrott gave Dr. Dre and 50 Cent the rights to "Bamba" for the song "P.I.M.P."

=== Other civil and criminal matters ===
One of his New York homes, purchased for $2.4 million in January 2007 and the center of a lawsuit between Jackson and Shaniqua Tompkins, caught fire on May 30, 2008, while he was filming in Louisiana. On August 5, 2013, Jackson pleaded not guilty to one count of domestic violence and four counts of vandalism in a Los Angeles County court. If convicted of all charges, he faced up to five years in prison and a $46,000 fine. Model-actress Daphne Joy accused Jackson of kicking her and ransacking her bedroom during an argument at her condominium in the Toluca Lake neighborhood of Los Angeles on June 23. He allegedly caused $7,100 in property damage, leaving the scene before police arrived.

Judge Ann Nevins has ordered Jackson back to court because of Instagram messages he made over several months. She said Jackson was not fully clear about his funds and indicated posts of the rapper showing stacks of his money. In March 2016, Jackson claimed that he would no longer use Instagram, electing instead to have his profile page operated by someone else.

In June 2018, after former linebacker and actor Terry Crews gave a speech before the United States Senate Committee on the Judiciary in which he described being groped by a Hollywood agent in 2016, Jackson posted a photo on Instagram of a shirtless muscular Crews with the caption: "I got raped. My wife just watched." After receiving backlash, Jackson deleted the post and wrote on Twitter: "People are so sensitive." In a July 2018 appearance on The View, Jackson stated that he would "never make fun of any sexual assault victim", adding: "I wasn't looking at Terry Crews that way, at that point. I'm looking at the Hulk. The guy is this big, that's being taken advantage of."

In 2020, Jackson was a subject of controversy for his involvement in a viral video of him giving money to a Burger King restaurant in New York City on behalf of a local scammer who was later arrested and charged for Bitcoin scamming and for assaulting and kidnapping his victims on April 24, 2021.

== Feuds ==
=== Ja Rule ===
Before he signed with Interscope Records, Jackson engaged in a public dispute with rapper Ja Rule and his label, Murder Inc. Records, saying that a friend robbed jewelry from Ja Rule and the latter accused him of orchestrating the robbery. Ja Rule said that the conflict stemmed from a Queens video shoot, when Jackson did not like seeing him "getting so much love" from the neighborhood. At The Hit Factory in New York in March 2000, Jackson had an altercation with Murder Inc. associates and received three stitches for a stab wound. Rapper Black Child claimed responsibility for the stabbing, saying that he acted in self-defense when he thought someone reached for a gun.

An affidavit by an Internal Revenue Service (IRS) agent suggested ties between Murder Inc. and Kenneth "Supreme" McGriff, a New York drug lord suspected of involvement in the murder of Jam Master Jay and Jackson's shooting. An excerpt read:

The investigation has uncovered a conspiracy involving McGriff and others to murder a rap artist who has released songs containing lyrics regarding McGriff's criminal activities. The rap artist was shot in 2000, survived and thereafter refused to cooperate with law enforcement regarding the shooting. Messages transmitted over the Murder Inc. pager indicate that McGriff is involved in an ongoing plot to kill this rap artist, and that he communicates with Murder Inc. employees concerning the target.

The end of the Jackson-Ja Rule feud was confirmed in May 2011. According to Ja Rule, "I'm cool. We ain't beefing no more. We'll never collaborate. That's just what it is. You don't have to be at war with somebody, but it's also kind of like U.S. and another country that they may not get along with. We don't gotta go to war, but we're not friends either. But we can coincide inside of a world. He's doing him, and he's not thinking about me, and I'm doing me and I'm not thinking about him."

On August 7, 2015, the feud between the two rappers later reignited when Ja Rule gave a feedback to a social follower via Twitter over a similar feud between Meek Mill and Drake. Enraged, Jackson later responded with photos and comments via Instagram, only siding with Drake. The feud resurfaced three years later on January 19, 2018, when Ja Rule took to Twitter, calling out 50 Cent on social media.

In October 2018, Jackson pranked Ja Rule by purchasing 200 discounted front-row tickets for an upcoming show of his in Arlington, Texas for a total of US$3,000 via Groupon, with Jackson later confirming on social media that he bought the tickets with the express intention of forcing Ja Rule to perform in front of rows of empty seats.

=== Jay-Z and Beyoncé ===
In 1999, with the release of the single "How to Rob", 50 Cent attacked his rap peers, including Jay-Z, who responded to the provocation with the single "It's Hot (Some Like It Hot)" in which he raps "Go against Jigga yo ass is dense/I'm about a dollar – what the f*ck is 50 Cents?".

In a 2009 interview with Rolling Stone, 50 Cent accused Jay-Z and his record company Roc-A-Fella Records of being unfair to Beanie Sigel because "[Jay-Z] didn't have their interests in mind, he was just doing what he had to do for himself." The rapper also stated that "I don't know him personally, [...] I tried to collaborate with him on the Freeway project ... What I did was Freeway went out and found his publishing deal, and we started the album. [...] when it came time to put the record out, he didn't want to shoot his video. He has a god complex." 50 Cent also accused Jay-Z of changing in attitude and image since marrying Beyoncé.

In 2017, 50 Cent described Jay-Z's thirteenth studio album 4:44 as "golf course music" in an Instagram post, elaborating: "I listened to Jay sh*t, that 4:44. [...] [It] was too smart. I felt like I was supposed to be wearing like glasses and shit and like a tie, a fucking sweater around my waist. It was like Ivy League. They don't wanna hear that shit. [...] They just wanna have a good time. You know what I'm saying? You can't be the best rapper at 47 because the new n****s is here. They coming with new [music] going on." In an interview on the Conan Show, 50 Cent spoke about the album, saying: "Hip-hop culture's connected to youth culture. The kids gonna bring new innovative stuff. He just had the maturity bleed off into the material. [...] But the kids, I don't see them actually listening to it".

In an interview in 2022, 50 Cent reported that in a meeting between him and the couple in Los Angeles, the two rappers were having a heated argument. Beyoncé, seeing them, jumped from a ledge to come to her husband's defense. 50 Cent compared the singer to her sister Solange when she hit Jay-Z in the elevator, describing them as "two gangstas".

In an interview for XXL Mag in 2023, 50 Cent claimed that Jay-Z's Grammy wins were due to his marriage to Beyoncé: "Even Jay-Z's career, you can look at that and say the association to Beyoncé is when he started to receive the 16, 17 Grammys, since he's been with Beyoncé. And you go, prior to that [he had] one. That came with the association." 50 Cent also pointed out that the couple's eldest child Blue Ivy Carter won a Grammy even though she does not sing or rap, accusing award ceremonies of giving accolades to the couple just to ensure their attendance during the show. The rapper also reported that his non-win at the Grammys was due to his music being "a little bit abrasive to conservatives; [...] It didn't matter to me in that time period. Don't give me the trophy. They didn't give me Best New Artist and I sold 13 million records", while the Carter-Knowles family is more politically agreeable to the music industry.

=== Fat Joe ===
In connection to his feud with Ja Rule, 50 Cent also took aim at fellow New York rapper Fat Joe, a high-profile collaborator of Ja Rule's. The feud took aim at Fat Joe following his 2002 track "What's Luv?" featuring Ja Rule and Ashanti. Fat Joe had also continued his collaboration with Murder Inc. on his 2004 track "New York" featuring Jadakiss, prompting a diss track aimed at Fat Joe from 50 Cent on his 2005 album The Massacre entitled "Piggy Bank". Fat Joe later responded with the track "My Fofo" on his album All or Nothing released later that same year. Tensions boiled over during the 2005 MTV Video Music Awards when Fat Joe presented the award for best Hip Hop Video, in which he told the audience "I feel so safe tonight with all this police protection courtesy of G-Unit". 50 Cent later retaliated with a profanity-laden diatribe following his performance of the song "So Seductive" with fellow G-Unit artist Tony Yayo, exclaiming "Fat Joe's a pussy man! [...] Pussy Boy, Nigga What?!". The feud later affected Fat Joe financially as he sought to secure a $20 million contract endorsing Air Jordan sneakers in early 2005, Michael Jordan himself later cancelled the contract following the VMA incident as he was in fear of conflict with 50 Cent or any other affiliates. Following this; little action was taken on either side as the feud seemed to calm down by 2011. Murder Inc. executive Irv Gotti later expressed anger at Fat Joe following his proposal to quell their longstanding feud with G-Unit in 2010. In 2012, 50 Cent approached Fat Joe in talks of ending the feud following the two agreeing to perform at a memorial ceremony for then-recently deceased music executive Chris Lighty. Despite the prior history between the two, 50 Cent and Fat Joe became close friends and business associates shortly thereafter despite Fat Joe's lengthy connections with Ja Rule.

=== The Game ===
Although Jackson was close to The Game before the latter released his debut album, The Documentary, they grew apart. After The Documentary's release, Jackson felt that The Game was disloyal for saying that he did not want to participate in G-Unit's feuds with other rappers (such as Nas, Jadakiss and Fat Joe) and his desire to work with artists with which G-Unit was feuding. He said that he wrote six songs for the album and did not receive proper credit, which The Game denied.

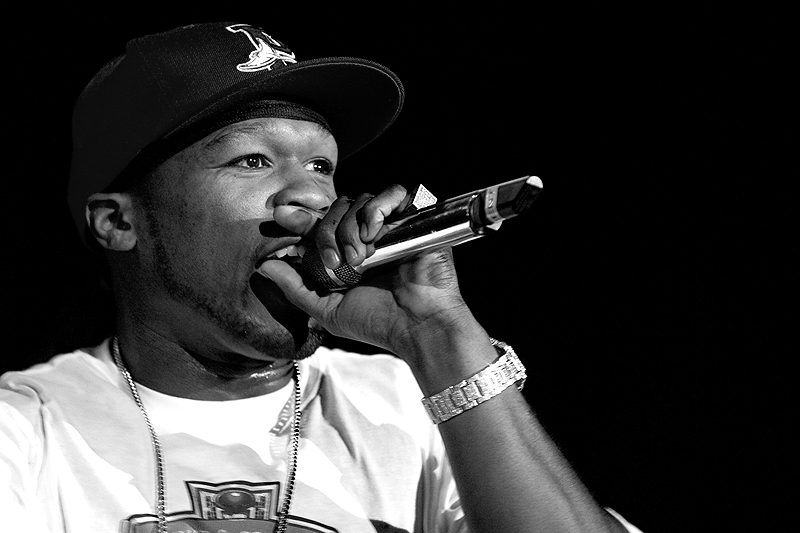
50 Cent at a 2007 concert

Jackson later dismissed The Game from G-Unit on Hot 97. After the announcement, The Game (a guest earlier in the evening) tried to enter the building with his entourage. After they were denied entry, one of his associates was shot in the leg in a confrontation with a group of men leaving the building. When the situation escalated, the rappers held a joint press conference announcing their reconciliation, and fans were uncertain if the rappers had staged a publicity stunt to boost sales of their recently released albums. After the situation cooled, G-Unit criticized The Game's street credibility and announced that they would not appear on his albums. During a Summer Jam performance The Game announced a boycott of G-Unit, which he called "G-Unot".

After the Summer Jam performance The Game recorded "300 Bars and Runnin'", an extended "diss" of G-Unit and Roc-A-Fella Records, for the mixtape You Know What It Is Vol. 3. Jackson responded with his "Piggy Bank" music video, with The Game as Mr. Potato Head and parodies of other rivals. They have continued attacking each other, with The Game releasing two more mixtapes: Ghost Unit and a mixtape-DVD, Stop Snitchin, Stop Lyin. Jackson superimposed The Game's head on the body of a male stripper for the cover of the Hate It or Love It (G-Unit Radio Part 21) mixtape in response to The Game's pictures of G-Unit dressed as the Village People. The Game, under contract to Aftermath Entertainment, signed with Geffen Records to terminate his contractual obligations with G-Unit (although it is claimed that Jackson pressured Dr. Dre to fire him). G-Unit member Spider Loc has insulted The Game in songs, and the latter released "240 Bars (Spider Joke)" and "100 Bars (The Funeral)" attacking G-Unit and Loc. Jackson's response was "Not Rich, Still Lyin'", mocking The Game. Lloyd Banks replied to the Game on a Rap City freestyle-booth segment, followed by a Game "diss" song ("SoundScan") ridiculing the 13-position drop of Banks' album Rotten Apple on the Billboard 200 chart and its disappointing second-week sales. Banks replied on his mixtape Mo' Money In The Bank Pt. 5: Gang Green Season Continues with "Showtime (The Game's Over)", said that Jackson wrote half of The Documentary and ridiculed The Game's suicidal thoughts.

In October 2006, The Game made a peace overture (which was not immediately answered) to Jackson, but two days later he said on Power 106 that the peace offer was valid for only one day. In several songs on Doctor's Advocate, he implied that the feud was over. He said in July 2009 that the feud had ended with help from Michael Jackson and Sean Combs, and apologized for his actions. According to Tony Yayo, neither Jackson nor G-Unit accepted his apology and The Game has resumed his calls for a "G-Unot" boycott at concerts. Jackson released "So Disrespectful" on Before I Self Destruct, targeting Jay-Z, The Game and Young Buck. The Game responded with "Shake", poking fun at the music video for Jackson's "Candy Shop".

On January 2, 2015, The Game claimed that he and 50 were "sworn enemies", promising never to reconcile with him anymore, but on August 1, 2016, they ended their twelve-year feud when the two were in the Ace of Diamonds strip club and The Game said "I love 50, man. What happened, that shit was 12 years ago."

In January 2022, the feud reignited after 50 critiqued Game's Drink Champs interview with N.O.R.E., where he claimed that 50's former competitor Kanye West did "more for me in two weeks than [Dr.] Dre did for me throughout my entire career". The Game responded, commenting that he enclosed the entirety of G-Unit as a group and clothing brand "in a casket", also expressing his likeliness in the Power television trilogy, but warning 50 to "leave [the past] alone or else... I'm outside #Numinati". Then, two months later, in March, 50 Cent published a video via Instagram of Game being shunned by former Interscope Records CEO Jimmy Iovine at a basketball game, poking fun of it while also commenting "50 wrote ya hits". The Game once again flamed 50 after the claims were brought back up and also bragged to "get [50's] girlfriend out of my DM's". This was believed to have been a consequential result of Game claiming on Drink Champs to be "the best and a better rapper" than Eminem, with whom 50 still remains close friends. Additionally, Game's manager, Wack 100, has subliminally called out or questioned 50 Cent's credibility, over the rapper's surprise appearance at the Super Bowl LVI halftime show and ghostwriting allegations.

=== Cam'ron ===
Jackson's issues with former The Diplomats member Cam'ron began in 2007, when they had a live argument on The Angie Martinez Show on Hot 97 radio. Jackson commented that he felt that the music division of Koch Entertainment (known today as MNRK Music Group) was a "graveyard", meaning major record labels would not work with their artists. Cam'ron then ridiculed the record sales of G-Unit members Lloyd Banks and Mobb Deep by pointing out that Dipset member Jim Jones outsold both of their albums despite not being signed to a major label, and also went on to clarify that his group, The Diplomats, had a distribution deal from several labels. Both rappers released diss songs with videos on YouTube. Jackson released "Funeral Music", and suggested in the song that Cam'ron is no longer able to lead The Diplomats and that Jim Jones should take his place. Cam'ron responded with "Curtis" and "Curtis Pt. II", in which he makes fun of not only Jackson's first name, but also his appearance, calling him "a gorilla, with rabbit teeth". Jackson responded by releasing "Hold On" with Young Buck. Since 2009, the feud slowly died down, and they eventually reconciled in 2016.

=== Rick Ross ===
Although Rick Ross began a feud with Jackson over an alleged incident at the 2008 BET Hip Hop Awards, Jackson told news sources he did not remember seeing Ross there. Later that month Ross' "Mafia Music" was leaked on the Internet, with lyrics apparently disparaging Jackson. Several days later, Jackson released "Officer Ricky (Go Head, Try Me)" in response to "Mafia Music". The following day, Ross appeared on Shade 45 (Eminem's Sirius channel) and told Jackson to come up with something better in 24 hours.

Before leaving for Venezuela, Jackson uploaded a video ("Warning Shot") and the first of a series of "Officer Ricky" cartoons. In early February he uploaded a YouTube video in which he interviewed "Tia", the mother of one of Ross' children; according to her, Ross is in reality a correctional officer. On February 5, 2009, The Game phoned Seattle radio station KUBE. Asked about the dispute between Jackson and Ross, he sided with Jackson and offered to mediate: "Rick Ross, holla at your boy, man" and "50 eating you, boy."

On his album Deeper Than Rap, Ross refers to Jackson in "In Cold Blood" and Jackson's mock funeral is part of the song's video. When the song was released, Ross said that he ended Jackson's career. "Rick Ross is Albert From CB4. You ever seen the movie? He's Albert," Jackson replied in an interview. "It never gets worse than this. You get a guy that was a correctional officer come out and base his entire career on writing material from a drug dealer's perspective such as "Freeway" Ricky Ross." Their feud rekindled at the 2012 BET Hip Hop Awards, where Jackson and G-Unit members Kidd Kidd, Mike Knox, Tony Yayo were seen on video attacking Gunplay (a member of Ross' Maybach Music Group). Gunplay's Maybach Music diamond necklace was stolen during the brawl, and several days later Jackson appeared at a Washington, D.C. bowling alley wearing Gunplay's chain. On January 30, 2013, Jackson tweeted that Ross' attempted drive-by shooting on his birthday three days earlier was "staged".

=== Floyd Mayweather Jr. ===
Jackson and Floyd Mayweather Jr. were close friends in the early 2000s, sharing key personal milestones including Mayweather's birthday party in Las Vegas in 2007. In 2012, he and Jackson co-founded the company "The Money Team" also known as “TMT”, which signs up-and-coming boxers. On December 21, 2011, Mayweather was sentenced to 90 days in county jail for domestic violence and battery. He started serving his sentence on June 1, leaving Jackson to run the promotion company. Mayweather was released two months later on August 3. Jackson then claimed Mayweather owed him $1 million for work done for TMT during Mayweather's jail sentence. This caused a public dispute in which the two traded insults via online videos.

Jackson then claimed Mayweather couldn't read and challenged him to read a full Harry Potter book in exchange for a donation of $750,000 to a charity of Mayweather's choosing. Mayweather rejected the challenge and insulted Jackson's strained relationship with his son, offering Jackson $1 million if he could post a video of his son saying "I love you". They continued to trade insults until in 2022, when Jackson & Mayweather reconciled in Las Vegas.

=== Sean Combs ===
Jackson's feud with Sean "Diddy" Combs began in 2006, when Jackson accused Combs of complicity in Biggie's murder in his diss track "The Bomb". Over the following decades, Jackson publicly criticized Combs several times, including insulting his rival vodka brand Cîroc (Jackson endorsed Effen) and complaining that Combs made him uncomfortable when he invited him to go shopping.

In 2023, when Combs' ex-girlfriend Cassie Ventura accused him of domestic abuse and rape, Jackson again taunted Combs, jokingly offering to take his place in endorsement deals that had abandoned Combs, and posting about the police raid on Combs' home. When CNN released video corroborating Cassie's allegation that Combs punched her, Jackson told the Hollywood Reporter "When someone watches that, if they have a daughter and they can imagine her being under those circumstances, that shit is crazy. Like, they let him get away with it."

Jackson has also stated he never attended any of the parties Combs hosted at which the latter was accused of engaging in sex trafficking, saying the parties had an "uncomfortable energy".

In 2024, Jackson announced he was executive producing a documentary about Combs sexual abuse and sex trafficking case, Sean Combs: The Reckoning, released on Netflix on December 2, 2025.

== Discography ==
Studio albums

- Get Rich or Die Tryin' (2003)
- The Massacre (2005)
- Curtis (2007)
- Before I Self Destruct (2009)
- Animal Ambition (2014)

Collaborative albums

- Beg for Mercy (with G-Unit) (2003)
- T·O·S (Terminate on Sight) (with G-Unit) (2008)

== Filmography ==
=== Film ===
Year	Title	Role	Notes
2005	Get Rich or Die Tryin'	Marcus "Young Caesar" Greer	
2006	Jack's Law	Black	
2006	Home of the Brave	Spc. Jamal Aiken	
2008	Righteous Kill	Marcus "Spider" Smith	
2009	Streets of Blood	Det. Stan Johnson	Video
2009	Dead Man Running	Thigo	
2009	Before I Self Destruct	Clarence Jenkins	Video
2010	Twelve	Lionel	
2010	13	Jimmy	
2010	Caught in the Crossfire	Tino	
2010	Gun	Rich	
2010	Morning Glory	Himself	
2011	All Things Fall Apart	Deon Barnes	
2011	Blood Out	Detective Hardwick	Video
2011	Setup	Sonny	
2012	Freelancers	Det. Jonas "Malo" Maldonado	
2012	Fire with Fire	Lamar	
2012	How to Make Money Selling Drugs	Himself	
2013	The Frozen Ground	Pimp Clate Johnson	
2013	Escape Plan	Hush	
2013	Last Vegas	Himself	
2014	Vengeance	Black	
2014	The Prince	The Pharmacy	
2015	Spy	Himself	
2015	Southpaw	Jordan Mains	
2016	Popstar: Never Stop Never Stopping	Himself	
2018	Den of Thieves	Levi Enson Levoux	
2018	Escape Plan 2: Hades	Hush	
2019	Escape Plan: The Extractors	Hush	
2023	Expend4bles	Easy Day	
2024	Boneyard	Chief Carter	
2025	Skillhouse	Himself	
2026	Street Fighter	Balrog	

=== Television ===
Year	Title	Role	Notes
2003	Chappelle's Show	Himself	Episode: "The Best of Chappelle's Show Volume 1 Mixtape"
2003–2005	Saturday Night Live	Himself/musical guest	Recurring guest
2003–2006	Top of the Pops	Himself/musical guest	Recurring guest
2005–2008	Access Granted	Himself	Recurring guest
2005	The Life & Rhymes of...	Himself	Episode: "50 Cent"
2005	The Simpsons	Himself (voice)	Episode: "Pranksta Rap"
2006	Flavor of Love	Himself	Episode: "Famous Friends and Strangeness"
2007	America's Next Top Model	Himself	Episode: "The Girl Who Gets Thrown in the Pool"
2007	Diary	Himself	Episode: "Diary of 50 Cent"
2007	MTV Cribs	Himself	Episode: "50 Cent"
2008–2009	50 Cent: The Money and the Power	Himself/host	Main host
2009	Entourage	Himself	Episode: "One Car, Two Car, Red Car, Blue Car"
2009	Party Monsters Cabo	Himself	Episode: "50 Cent"
2010	Pop Profiles	Himself	Episode: "50 Cent"
2011	Funk Flex Full Throttle	Himself	Episode: "Episode #2.1"
2011	The X Factor	Himself	Episode: "Live Season Finale, Part 2 of 2"
2012	Dream Machines	Himself	Episode: "50 Cent's Jet Car Part 1 & 2"
2012	The Finder	Big Glade	Episode: "Life After Death"
2013	MTV Cribs	Himself	Episode: "Retro Cribs"
2013	Robot Chicken	Gun/Himself (voice)	Episode: "Eaten by Cats"
2014	Dream School	Himself	Recurring Guest: season 2
2014–2020	Power	Kanan Stark	Recurring cast: season 1–2, main cast: season 3–6
2015	Ridiculousness	Himself	Episode: "50 Cent"
2016	Patti LaBelle's Place	Himself	Episode: "50 Cent and Naturi Naughton"
2017	Unsung	Himself	Episode: "Fat Joe" & "James Brown"
2017	Martha & Snoop's Potluck Dinner Party	Himself	Episode: "Makin' That Dough"
2017	50 Central	Himself	Main cast
2020	For Life	Cassius Dawkins	Recurring cast: season 1, guest: season 2
2021	Hip Hop Uncovered	Himself (voice)	Episode: "Victory Lap"
2021–22	Power Book II: Ghost	Kanan Stark	Recurring cast: Season 2
2022	Supreme Team	Himself	Episode: "Truth & Consequences"

=== Video games ===
Year	Title	Role	Notes
2005	50 Cent: Bulletproof	Himself	Voice and likeness
2009	50 Cent: Blood on the Sand	Himself	Voice and likeness
2009	Call of Duty: Modern Warfare 2	Navy SEAL	Voice only
