= 50 Central =

American television program

- Genre: Comedy
- Presented by: 50 Cent
- Country of origin: United States
- Original language: English
- No. of seasons: 1
- No. of episodes: 12

Production
- Executive producers: 50 Cent; Stephen J. Savva; Colby Gaines; Michael A. Blum; Ian Gelfand; Riley Robbins
- Producers: Hasmik Torosyan; Michael Twigg
- Running time: 22 minutes
- Production companies: G-Unit Films and Television Inc.; Back Roads Entertainment

Original release
- Network: BET
- Release: September 27 – December 6, 2017

50 Central is an American sketch comedy television series hosted by 50 Cent. The series premiered on BET on September 27, 2017.

== Episodes ==
No.	Title	Directed by	Written by	Original release date	U.S. viewers (millions)
1	"Katt Williams Is Loose"	Unknown	Unknown	September 27, 2017	0.215
2	"Don't Miss This New Phone Plan"	Unknown	Unknown	October 4, 2017	0.237
3	"Family That Prays Together Stays Together"	Unknown	Unknown	October 11, 2017	0.340
4	"A New Superhero"	Unknown	Unknown	October 18, 2017	0.266
5	"We Got Porn for Women!"	Unknown	Unknown	October 25, 2017	0.219
6	"The Juice Is Loose"	Unknown	Unknown	November 1, 2017	0.231
7	"Cooking with Snoop & Eddie Murphy"	Unknown	Unknown	November 8, 2017	0.193
8	"Cop Insurance"	Unknown	Unknown	November 15, 2017	0.165
9	"Amistad Travel Agency"	Unknown	Unknown	November 22, 2017	0.214
10	"Ballin on a Budget"	Unknown	Unknown	November 29, 2017	0.169
11	"Girl Scout Weed Cookies"	Unknown	Unknown	December 6, 2017	0.189
12	"The Struggle Is Real"	Unknown	Unknown	December 6, 2017	N/A
