= G-Unity Foundation =

American charitable organization

The G-Unity Foundation Inc.
- Founded: 2005
- Type: Private charitable organization
- Location: New York City, U.S.
- Key people: Curtis Jackson; Lloyd Banks; Tony Yayo
- Website: www.gunityfoundation.org

The G-Unity Foundation Inc. (more commonly abbreviated as G-Unity) is an American nonprofit public foundation established by rapper 50 Cent and his group G-Unit. The foundation provides grants to nonprofit organizations that focus on improving the quality of life for low-income and under-served communities across the United States. The main goals of the charity are to emphasize the critical importance of supporting academic institutions, to support nonprofit organizations that focus on the academic enrichment of a child, and to support after school activities.
