= G-Unit Books =

American book publishing imprint

G-Unit Books was an American book publishing imprint started by rapper 50 Cent in partnership with MTV/Pocketbooks on January 4, 2007, following a prior relationship with the company dating back to the publication of his memoir in 2005. He launched G-Unit Books at the Time Warner Building in New York.

In addition to his memoir, 50 also co-wrote The Ski Mask Way, a novel about a small-time drug dealer who attempts to rob his employers. All G-Unit books were meant to be street fiction encouraging reading at a younger age.

G-Unit Books released its last book in 2011.

== Bibliography ==
- From Pieces To Weight: Once Upon A Time In Southside Queens (2006)
- Baby Brother (2007)
- Death Before Dishonor (2007)
- The Ski Mask Way (2007)
- Blow (2007)
- Derelict (2007)
- Harlem Heat (2007)
- Heaven's Fury (2007)
- The Diamond District (2008)
- Tia's Diary: Deeper Than Rap (2009)
- The 50th Law (2009)
- Playground (2011)
