= G-Unit Clothing Company =

American clothing retailer

The G-Unit Clothing Company
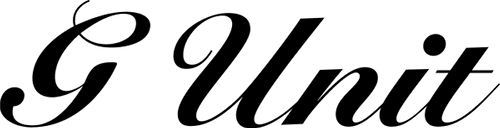
- Company type: Urban Clothing
- Industry: Fashion
- Founded: 2003
- Headquarters: New York
- Key people: 50 Cent, Marc Eckō
- Products: Clothing and Footwear
- Website: https://www.gunitbrands.com/

The G-Unit Clothing Company is an American clothing retailer established in 2003 when 50 Cent teamed up with Marc Ecko, the founder of Ecko Unltd. to create a line of clothing and accessories by 50 Cent and G-Unit. Since its initial launch, the brand has generated $100 million in retail sales.

As of 2019, the brand is exclusively sold online.

== History ==
The clothing line was announced in 2003 as a joint partnership between 50 Cent and Marc Eckō, founder of Eckō Unltd. The deal was said to be unique as Ecko wasn't handling the designing of the clothing, but rather the marketing and merchandising of the brand. Marc Eckō likened the deal to "Nike and (Michael) Jordan coming together for Air Jordan". 50 Cent maintains full ownership of the line, along with the opportunity to re-launch it on his own.

In February 2008, it was announced that G-Unit clothing had ended its partnership with Marc Eckō. However, only a few months later, it was announced that G-Unit had re-established partnership with plans of a Spring 2009 collection.
