= List of awards and nominations received by 50 Cent =

50 Cent awards and nominations
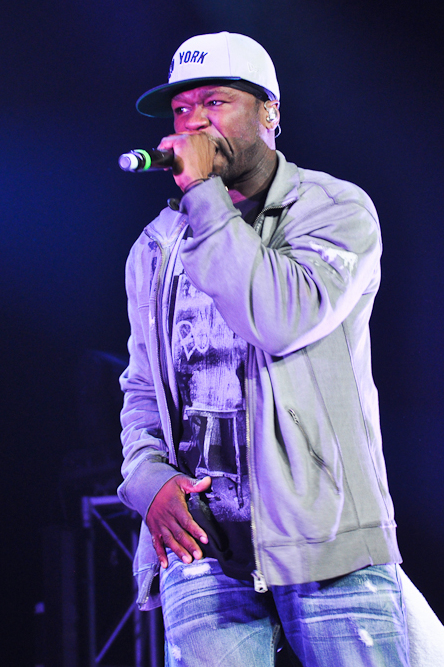
- 50 Cent in 2011
Awards and nominations
Award	Wins	Nominations
American Music Awards	3	6
ASCAP Awards	11	0
AVN Awards	2	4
BET Awards	3	7
BET Hip Hop Awards	1	2
Billboard Music Awards	13	18
Billboard R&B/Hip-Hop Awards	16	0
Grammy Awards	1	14
MOBO Awards	3	0
MTV Video Music Awards	2	8
Primetime Emmy Awards	1	1
The Source Awards	3	0
Vibe Awards	6	8
World Music Awards	6	0

Totals (Note: Certain award groups do not simply award one winner. They acknowledge several different recipients, have runners-up, and have third place. Since this is a specific recognition and is different from losing an award, runner-up mentions are considered wins in this award tally. For simplification and to avoid errors, each award in this list has been presumed to have had a prior nomination.)
- Wins: 74
- Nominations: 137

50 Cent is an American rapper and actor. After releasing his mixtape Guess Who's Back? in 2002, he was discovered by rapper Eminem and signed to Interscope Records. His commercial debut album Get Rich or Die Tryin' (2003) earned him a Best New Artist nomination at the 46th Grammy Awards, a Billboard Music Award for Album of the Year, and the ASCAP Songwriter of the Year Award. 50 Cent's second album The Massacre (2005) earned him five Grammy nominations, six Billboard Music Awards, and another ASCAP Songwriter of the Year award. His third album Curtis made him the Best-Selling Hip-Hop Artist at the 2007 World Music Awards. Currently, 50 Cent has received 86 awards from 135 nominations.

== American Music Awards ==
50 Cent has won three awards from six nominations at the annual American Music Awards.

Year	Nominee / work	Award	Result
2003	Get Rich or Die Tryin'	Favorite Rap/Hip-Hop Album	Won
2003	50 Cent	Favorite Rap/Hip-Hop Male Artist	Won
2003	50 Cent	Fan's Choice Award	Nominated
2005	The Massacre	Favorite Rap/Hip-Hop Album	Won
2005	50 Cent	Favorite Pop/Rock Male Artist	Nominated
2005	50 Cent	Favorite Rap/Hip-Hop Male Artist	Nominated

== ASCAP Awards ==
The ASCAP Awards are held annually by the American Society of Composers, Authors and Publishers.

=== Pop Music Awards ===
The annual ASCAP Pop Music Awards honors the songwriters and publishers of the most performed pop songs. 50 Cent has won four awards.

Year	Nominee / work	Award	Result
2004	50 Cent	Songwriter of the Year^{1}	Won
2005	"In da Club"	Most Performed Song	Won
2005	"P.I.M.P."	Most Performed Song	Won
2006	50 Cent	Songwriter of the Year^{2}	Won

^{1} Awarded for "21 Questions", "In da Club", and "Magic Stick".
^{2} Awarded for "Candy Shop", "Disco Inferno", "Hate It or Love It", "How We Do", and "Just a Lil Bit".

=== Rhythm & Soul Music Awards ===
The annual ASCAP Rhythm & Soul Music Awards honors songwriters and publishers of top R&B, hip hop, and reggae music. 50 Cent has won seven awards.

Year	Nominee / work	Award	Result
2004	50 Cent	Songwriter of the Year^{3}	Won
2004	"In da Club"	Top R&B/Hip-Hop Song	Won
2004	"In da Club"	Top Rap Song	Won
2005	"In da Club"	Top Ringtone Song of the Year	Won
2006	50 Cent	Songwriter of the Year^{4}	Won
2006	"How We Do"	Top Rap Song	Won
2006	"Candy Shop"	Ringtone of the Year	Won

^{3} Awarded for "21 Questions", "In da Club", "Magic Stick", "P.I.M.P.", and "Wanksta".
^{4} Awarded for "Candy Shop", "Disco Inferno", "Hate It or Love It", "How We Do", and "Just a Lil Bit".

== AVN Awards ==
The AVN Awards are movie awards sponsored and presented by the American adult video industry trade magazine AVN (Adult Video News). 50 Cent has won two awards from four nominations.

Year	Nominee / work	Award	Result
2005	Groupie Love	Best Interactive DVD	Won
2005	Groupie Love	Best Music	Won
2005	Groupie Love	Best DVD Extras	Nominated
2005	Groupie Love	Best DVD Menus	Nominated

== BET Awards ==
The BET Awards were established in 2001 by the Black Entertainment Television network to celebrate African Americans and other minorities in music, acting, sports, and other fields of entertainment. The awards are presented annually and broadcast live on BET. 50 Cent has won four awards from eight nominations.

Year	Nominee / work	Award	Result
2003	50 Cent	Best New Artist	Won
2003	50 Cent	Best Male Hip-Hop Artist	Won
2004	50 Cent	Best Male Hip-Hop Artist	Nominated
2004	G-Unit	Best Group	Won
2004	"Hate It or Love It"	Best Collaboration	Nominated
2005	50 Cent	Best Male Hip-Hop Artist	Nominated
2006	50 Cent	Best Hip-Hop Artist	Nominated
2006	50 Cent	Best Male Hip-Hop Artist	Nominated

== BET Hip Hop Awards ==
The BET Hip Hop Awards are hosted annually by BET for hip hop performers, producers, and music video directors. 50 Cent has been won first, but from his second nominations.

Year	Nominee / work	Award	Result
2007	50 Cent	Hustler of the Year	Won
2007	"I Get Money"	Track of the Year	Nominated
2007	"I Get Money"	Best Hip Hop Video	Nominated
2008	50 Cent	Hustler of the Year	Nominated
2009	Thisis50	Best Hip Hop Online Site	Nominated
2010	Thisis50	Best Hip Hop Online Site	Nominated

== Billboard Music Awards ==
The Billboard Music Awards are sponsored by Billboard magazine and is held annually in December. The awards are based on sales data by Nielsen SoundScan and radio information by Nielsen Broadcast Data Systems. 50 Cent has won thirteen awards from eighteen nominations.

Year	Nominee / work	Award	Result
2003	Get Rich or Die Tryin'	Album of the Year	Won
2003	"In Da Club"	Hot 100 Single of the Year	Won
2003	50 Cent	Artist of the Year	Won
2003	50 Cent	R&B/Hip-Hop Artist of the Year	Won
2003	50 Cent	Rap Artist of the Year	Won
2003	50 Cent	Hot 100 Male Artist of the Year	Won
2004	"In da Club"	Ringtone of the Year	Won
2004	"P.I.M.P."	Ringtone of the Year	Nominated
2005	50 Cent	Artist of the Year	Won
2005	50 Cent	Hot 100 Artist of the Year	Won
2005	50 Cent	R&B/Hip-Hop Artist of the Year	Won
2005	50 Cent	Rap Artist of the Year	Won
2005	"Candy Shop"	Ringtone of the Year	Won
2005	"Candy Shop"	Rap Song of the Year	Nominated
2005	"How We Do"	Rap Song of the Year	Nominated
2005	The Massacre	Album of the Year	Won
2005	The Massacre	R&B/Hip-Hop Album of the Year	Nominated
2005	The Massacre	Rap Album of the Year	Nominated

=== Billboard R&B/Hip-Hop Awards ===
The Billboard R&B/Hip-Hop Awards reflect the performance of recordings on the R&B/hip-hop and rap charts. 50 Cent has won all sixteen awards from the sixteen nominations.

Year	Nominee / work	Award	Result
2003	50 Cent	Top R&B/Hip-Hop Artist	Won
2003	50 Cent	Top Male R&B/Hip-Hop Artist	Won
2003	50 Cent	Top New R&B/Hip-Hop Artist	Won
2003	50 Cent	Top R&B/Hip-Hop Singles Artist	Won
2003	50 Cent	Top R&B/Hip-Hop Album Artist	Won
2003	Get Rich or Die Tryin'	Top R&B/Hip-Hop Album	Won
2003	Get Rich or Die Tryin'	Top Rap Album	Won
2003	"In da Club"	Top R&B/Hip-Hop Single	Won
2003	"In da Club"	Top R&B/Hip-Hop Singles Airplay	Won
2003	"In da Club"	Hot Rap Track of the Year	Won
2005	50 Cent	Top R&B/Hip-Hop Album Artist	Won
2005	50 Cent	Top R&B/Hip-Hop Artist	Won
2005	50 Cent	Top Male R&B/Hip-Hop Artist	Won
2005	50 Cent	Top R&B/Hip-Hop Singles Artist	Won
2005	The Massacre	Top R&B/Hip-Hop Album	Won
2005	The Massacre	Top Rap Album	Won

== BRIT Awards ==
The BRIT Awards are an annual awards ceremony presented by the British Phonographic Industry, related to popular music. 50 Cent has been nominated for a total of three Brit Awards and has won one of them.

Year	Nominee / work	Award	Result
2004	50 Cent	Best International Breakthrough Artist	Won
2004	50 Cent	Best International Male	Nominated
2004	50 Cent	Best International Album	Nominated

== Danish Music Awards ==
Year	Nominee / work	Award	Result
2004	"In da Club"	International Hit of the Year	Nominated
2004	50 Cent	Foreign Newcomer of the Year	Nominated

== GAFFA Awards ==
=== Denmark GAFFA Awards ===
Delivered since 1991, the GAFFA Awards are a Danish award that rewards popular music by the magazine of the same name.

Year	Nominee / work	Award	Result	Ref.
2003	Himself	Best Foreign New Act	Nominated	

== Grammy Awards ==
The Grammy Awards are awarded annually by the National Academy of Recording Arts and Sciences. 50 Cent has been nominated 14 times and won 1.

Year	Nominated work	Award	Result
2004	50 Cent	Best New Artist	Nominated
2004	"In da Club"	Best Male Rap Solo Performance	Nominated
2004	"In da Club"	Best Rap Song	Nominated
2004	"Magic Stick" (with Lil' Kim)	Best Rap Performance by a Duo or Group	Nominated
2004	Get Rich or Die Tryin'	Best Rap Album	Nominated
2006	"Disco Inferno"	Best Male Rap Solo Performance	Nominated
2006	"Encore" (with Eminem & Dr. Dre)	Best Rap Performance by a Duo or Group	Nominated
2006	"Hate It or Love It" (with The Game)	Best Rap Performance by a Duo or Group	Nominated
2006	"Hate It or Love It" (with The Game)	Best Rap Song	Nominated
2006	"Candy Shop"	Best Rap Song	Nominated
2006	The Massacre	Best Rap Album	Nominated
2008	"I Get Money"	Best Rap Solo Performance	Nominated
2008	"Ayo Technology" (with Justin Timberlake & Timbaland)	Best Rap Song	Nominated
2010	"Crack A Bottle"(with Eminem & Dr. Dre)	Best Rap Performance By A Duo Or Group	Won

== Latin Grammy Awards ==
Year	Nominee / work	Award	Result
2009	Mujeres In The Club	Best Urban Song	Nominated

== MOBO Awards ==
The MOBO Awards (an acronym for "Music of Black Origin") were established in 1996 by Kanya King. They are held annually in the United Kingdom to recognize artists of any race or nationality performing music of black origin. 50 Cent has won three awards.

Year	Nominee / work	Award	Result
2004	50 Cent	Best Hip-Hop Act	Won
2004	Get Rich or Die Tryin'	Best Album	Won
2004	"In da Club"	Best Single	Won

== MTV Video Music Awards ==
The MTV Video Music Awards were established in 1984 by MTV to celebrate the top music videos of the year. 50 Cent has won two awards from eight nominations.

Year	Nominee / work	Award	Result
2003	"In da Club"	Best Rap Video	Won
2003	"In da Club"	Best New Artist In a Video	Won
2003	"In da Club"	Best Video of the Year	Nominated
2003	"In da Club"	Best Male Video	Nominated
2003	"In da Club"	Viewer's Choice	Nominated
2004	"P.I.M.P."	Best Rap Video	Nominated
2005	"Candy Shop"	Best Male Video	Nominated
2006	"Window Shopper"	Best Rap Video	Nominated

== NAACP Image Awards ==
Year	Nominated work	Award	Result
2013	Formula 50: A 6-Week Workout and Nutrition Plan That Will Transform Your Life	Outstanding Literary Work – Instructional	Nominated
2020	Power (Episode: "Forgot About Dre")	Outstanding Directing in a Drama Series	Won

== NRJ Music Awards ==
Year	Nominee / work	Award	Result
2006	50 cent	International Male Artist Of The Year	Nominated
2008	50 cent and Justin Timberlake	Best Collaboration	Nominated
2008	Ayo Technology	Video of the Year	Nominated

== Primetime Emmy Awards ==
The Primetime Emmy Awards are bestowed by the Academy of Television Arts & Sciences (ATAS), in recognition of excellence in U.S. American primetime television programming.

Year	Nominee / work	Award	Result
2022	The Pepsi Super Bowl LVI Halftime Show	Outstanding Variety Special (Live)	Won

== Satellite Awards ==
The Satellite Awards are annual awards given by the International Press Academy that are commonly noted in entertainment industry journals and blogs. 50 Cent had nominated for his first time including Best Original Song.

Year	Nominee / work	Award	Result
2005	Hustler's Ambition	Best Original Song	Nominated

== Soul Train Music Awards ==
Year	Nominee / work	Award	Result
2003	"Wanksta"	Best R&B/Soul or Rap Music Video	Nominated

== The Source Awards ==
The Source Hip-Hop Music Awards Show are hosted annually by The Source magazine. 50 Cent has won three awards.

Year	Nominee / work	Award	Result
2003	Get Rich or Die Tryin'	Album of the Year	Won
2003	"In da Club"	Single of the Year	Won
2003	50 Cent	Breakthrough Artist of the Year	Won

== Teen Choice Awards ==
The Teen Choice Awards is an awards show presented annually by the Fox Broadcasting Company. 50 Cent had received two nominations. Also, he won once.

Year	Nominee / work	Award	Result
2003	21 Questions	Choice Music - Collaboration	Won
2006	Get Rich or Die Tryin'	Choice Breakout Male	Nominated

== Vibe Awards ==
The Vibe Awards are hosted annually by Vibe magazine. 50 Cent has won six awards from eight nominations.

Year	Nominee / work	Award	Result
2003	50 Cent	Artist of the Year	Won
2003	Get Rich or Die Tryin'	Dopest Album	Won
2003	"In da Club"	Hottest Hook	Won
2004	G-Unit	Best Group	Won
2005	"Hate It or Love It"	Hottest Hook	Won
2005	50 Cent	Artist of the Year	Nominated
2005	50 Cent	Best Rapper	Won
2005	"So Seductive"	Club Banger	Nominated

== World Music Awards ==
The annual World Music Awards, founded in 1989, is an international awards show that honors recording artists based on their worldwide sales figures, which are provided by the International Federation of the Phonographic Industry. 50 Cent has won six awards.

Year	Nominee / work	Award	Result
2003	50 Cent	Best Artist of the Year	Won
2003	50 Cent	Best New Artist	Won
2003	50 Cent	Best R&B Act	Won
2003	50 Cent	Best Hip-Hop Act	Won
2003	50 Cent	Best Pop Act	Won
2007	50 Cent	Best-Selling Hip-Hop Artist	Won
2012	50 Cent	Best Male Artist	Nominated
2012	50 Cent	Best Artist Entertainer of The Year	Nominated
2012	"My Life" (with Eminem and Adam Levine)	Best Song	Nominated
2012	"My Life" (with Eminem and Adam Levine)	Best Video	Nominated
