= Pranksta Rap =

- The Simpsons episode
- Bart and 50 Cent
- Episode no.: Season 16; Episode 9
- Directed by: Mike B. Anderson
- Written by: Matt Selman
- Production code: GABF03
- Original air date: February 13, 2005

Guest appearances
- 50 Cent as himself; Dana Gould as Barney Fife

Episode features
- Couch gag: The living room floor is a chessboard and the family hops to the couch dressed as chess pieces.
- Commentary: Al Jean; Matt Selman; Ian Maxtone-Graham; Dana Gould; Nancy Cartwright; Tom Gammill; Max Pross; Mike B. Anderson; Mark Kirkland; David Silverman

Episode chronology
← Previous "Homer and Ned's Hail Mary Pass"	Next → "There's Something About Marrying"
- The Simpsons season 16

"Pranksta Rap" is the ninth episode of the sixteenth season of the American animated television series The Simpsons. It originally aired on the Fox network in the United States on February 13, 2005. The episode was directed by Mike B. Anderson and written by Matt Selman. The episode title refers to the music genre gangsta rap.

In this episode, Bart disobeys his parents to attend a concert and fakes his kidnapping to avoid being punished. Rapper 50 Cent guest starred as himself and Dana Gould guest starred as Barney Fife. The episode received positive reviews.

== Plot ==
Bart sees a commercial for a concert held by a hip hop artist named Alcatraaaz. He asks for Homer's permission, and he agrees when Bart says he will pay for the ticket himself. However, as he tries to leave for the concert, Marge forbids him from going, and Homer is forced to agree with her.

Bart sneaks out of his bedroom window to attend the concert. During the concert, Alcatraaaz drops his microphone, which lands in Bart's hands. He challenges Bart to a rap battle. Bart does an impromptu rap and wins, so he gets a ride home from the concert with Alcatraaaz. As he arrives, he overhears Marge and Homer, who are angry that Bart disobeyed them and went to the concert. To avoid punishment, he fakes being kidnapped and goes on the run. Homer and Marge are devastated, and the fake kidnapping is covered by the media. Chief Wiggum vows to solve the case, but the press laughs at him due to his incompetence. Bart asks Milhouse for a place to stay until the publicity stops, so Milhouse suggests staying at his father's apartment.

Bart calls the Simpson house impersonating the kidnapper, which is being recorded by Wiggum. Hearing how sad Marge is without him, Bart comforts her as himself, but cuts the call short when his stovetop popcorn begins to pop. Wiggum listens to the recording and recognizes the noise of the popcorn as his favorite brand. He asks Apu who buys the brand, and he says that only Kirk and Wiggum buy it. They arrest Kirk for the kidnapping, and Wiggum is promoted to police commissioner. Seeing how badly Milhouse has been affected by his father's arrest, Bart confesses his hoax to Wiggum, who convinces him to keep it secret because Kirk is better off in prison because he gets meals and the adoration of women for being a felon.

Lisa deduces the truth after finding a sweater from the concert, but Homer destroys the evidence because he sold the film rights to Bart's story and already spent the money. Undeterred, Lisa and Principal Skinner travel to Alcatraaaz's home, where they find footage of Bart at the concert. Moments later, Homer, Wiggum and Bart arrive and try to convince Lisa to stop because no one has been hurt. Alcatraaaz suggests they resolve the situation by throwing a pool party to the delight of everyone but Lisa.

During the tag scene, Skinner asks about a job in the hip hop business, but Alcatraaaz says he has already hired Superintendent Chalmers, who, dressed as a rapper, orders Skinner to "step off... dawg." As Alcatraaaz's group laughs at him, Chalmers quietly confesses to Skinner that he needs the job as his wife is very sick.

== Production ==
The hip hop songs in the episode were written and performed by Boots Riley of the rap group The Coup. Writer Matt Selman wrote the lyrics. The character Alcatraaaz appeared to be modeled after rapper Ludacris, who later appeared in the eighteenth season episode "You Kent Always Say What You Want".

Rapper 50 Cent appeared as himself in a cameo appearance.

== Reception ==
=== Viewing figures ===
The episode earned a 2.9 rating and was watched by 8.01 million viewers, which was the 62nd most-watched show that week.

=== Critical response ===
Colin Jacobson of DVD Movie Guide said the episode reminded him of the third season episode "Radio Bart" and that the use of Chief Wiggum and Kirk Van Houten made it a "likeable" episode.

On Four Finger Discount, Guy Davis and Brendan Dando liked Wiggum's story and would have liked if he had remained the commissioner for new story possibilities.

== Legacy ==
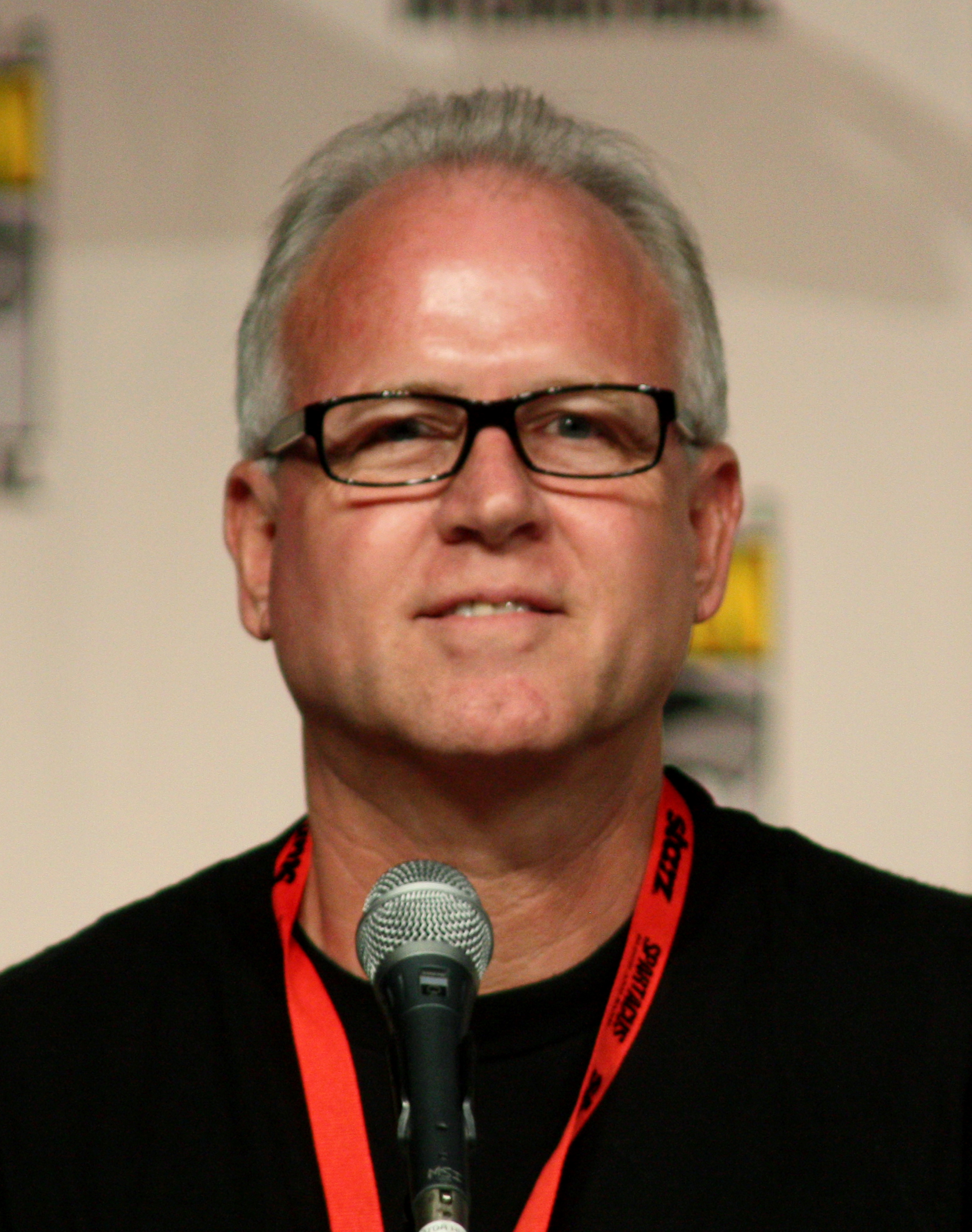
Mike B. Anderson directed the episode.

Andrew Martin of Prefix Mag named 50 Cent his eighth favorite musical guest on The Simpsons out of a list of ten. Charles Hiroshi Garrett cited the rapper's appearance as part of a trend of hip-hop artists who appear on film and television to ridicule themselves.

A still frame from the episode showing a rapper wearing a chain necklace with the words "Thursday the 20th" has become an Internet meme, with the frame getting circulated across the Internet on the twentieth day of a month if it is a Thursday. In October 2022, the meme became a purported prediction of the series when it was the date that Liz Truss resigned as Prime Minister of the United Kingdom.
