= Effen =

- Village
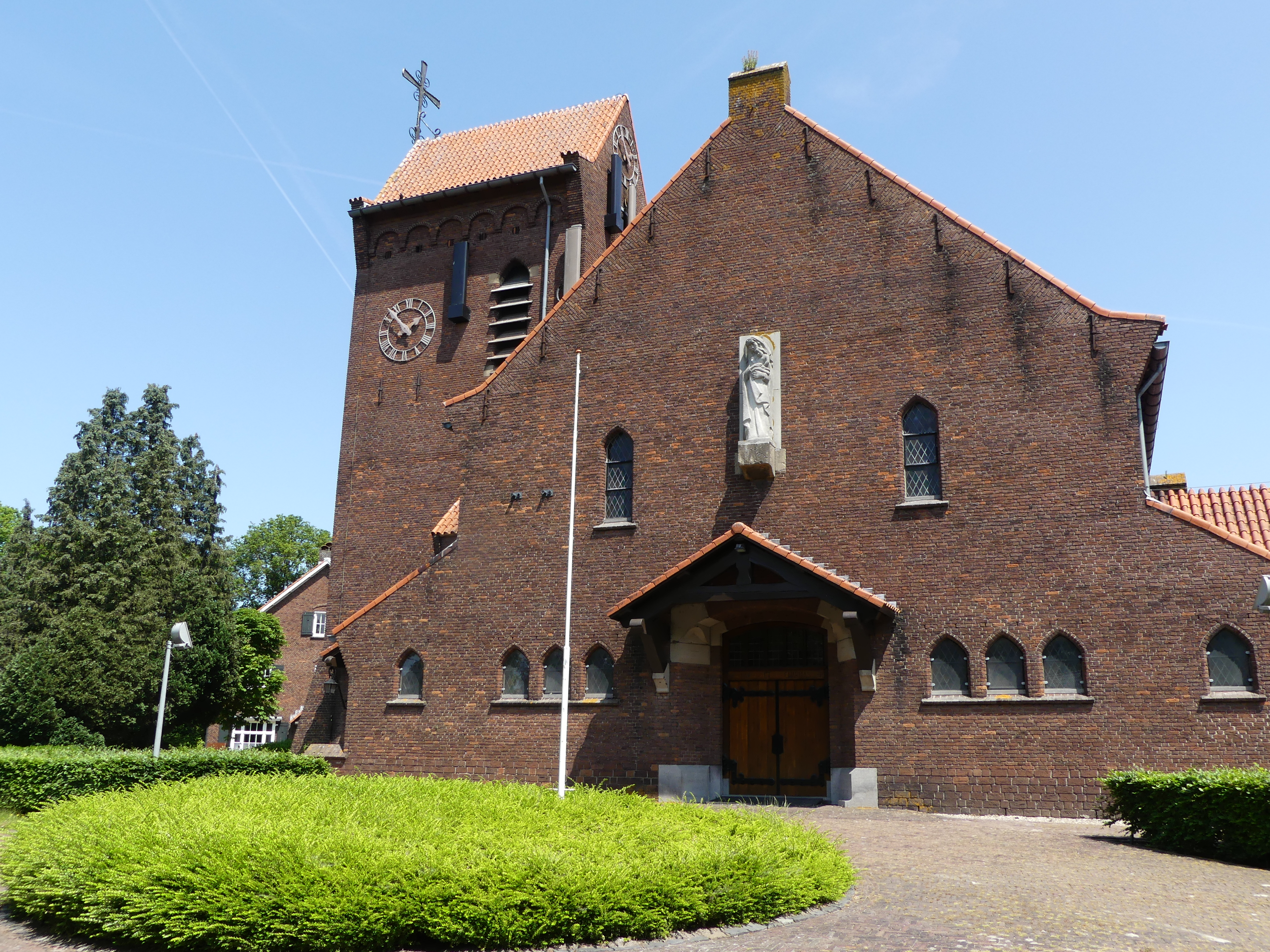
- Sight on the church of Effen

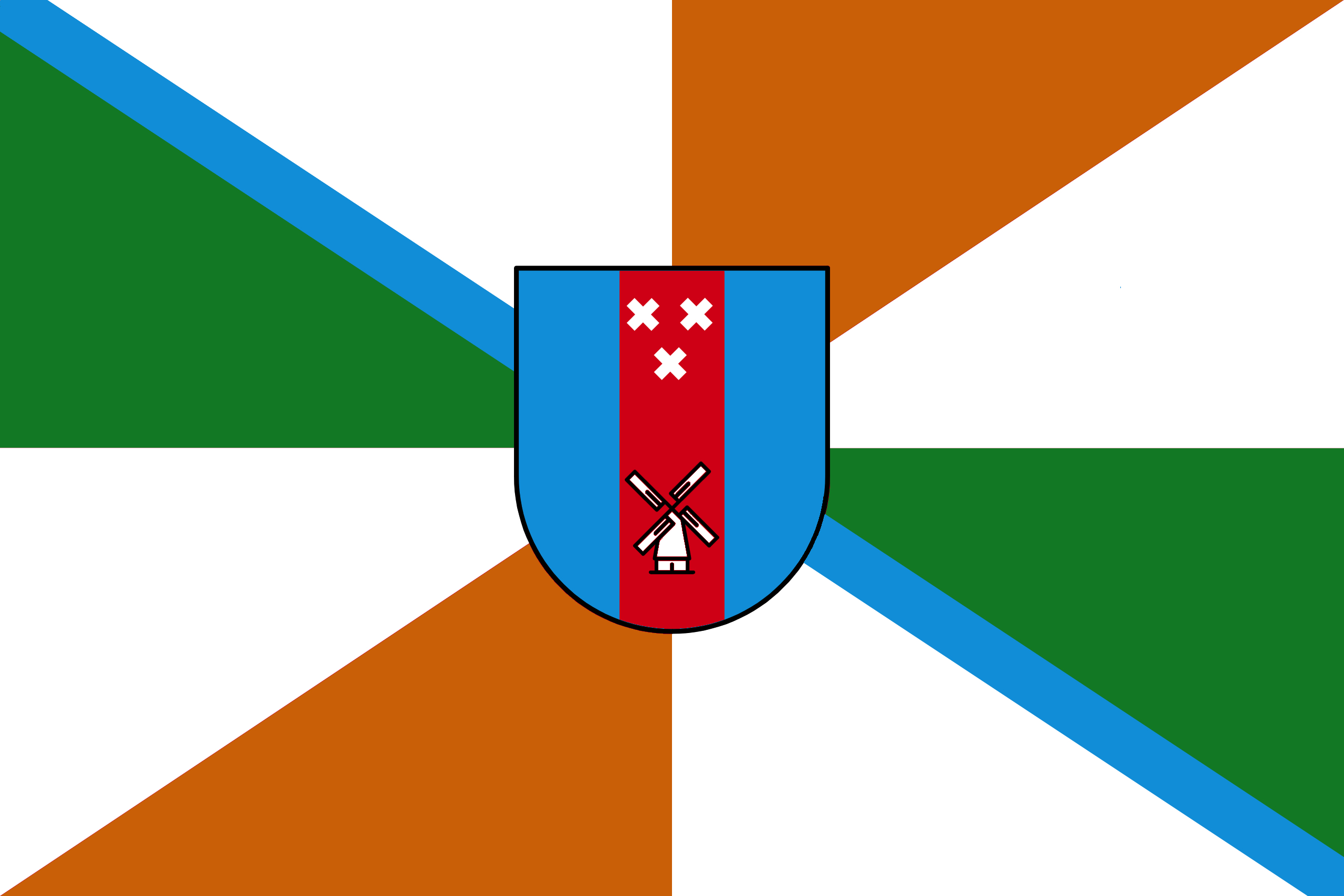
- Flag

- Map of Effen within municipality Breda in red
- Country: Netherlands
- Province: North Brabant
- Municipality: Breda

Area
  - Total: 8.98 km^{2} (3.47 sq mi)
  - Land: 8.93 km^{2} (3.45 sq mi)
  - Water: 0.05 km^{2} (0.019 sq mi)

Population (2025)
  - Total: 870
  - Density: 97/km^{2} (250/sq mi)
- Demonym: Effennaar
- Time zone: UTC+1 (Central European Time)
  - Summer (DST): UTC+2 (Central European Summer Time)
- Postal code: 4838
- Area code: 076

Effen is a village part of municipality Breda. Effen borders Liesbos, Mastbos, Princenhage and Rijsbergen.

== History ==
Effen was first mentioned in 1310. The name originally ended with heem, which means house or residence. The village Effen came later, in the 1800s-1900s. Effen was freed from the Germans on October 28, 1944. Effen became part of municipality of Breda in 1942.

== Development ==
As demonstrated in the table below, the biggest age group of Effen are middle-aged adults (aged 45–65).

Age distribution in Effen
Age group	Population	Percentage
0-15	110	12.6%
15-25	105	12.1%
25-45	145	16.7%
45-65	300	34.5%
65+	210	24.1%

92% of residents are born in the Netherlands, 8% are foreign-born residents.

35,7% of foreign-born residents are born outside of Europe, 64,3% are born inside of Europe.

== Facilities ==
At the Effenseweg, there is a child center called De Avonturier. At the Oude Rijsbergsebaan, there is a GP called Kloosterman.

== Public Transportation ==
Bus 374 goes through Effen. The exact path of Bus 374 is:

Zundert - Rijsbergen - Effen - Breda railway station - Terheijden - Wagenberg - Made
