= Dream Machines =

American reality television series

Dream Machines is a reality television series broadcast by the channel Syfy. It features the Parker brothers building concept cars for celebrities or organizations, they (along with the series) are located in Melbourne, Florida.

== Episode list ==
=== Season 1 ===
Episode 1 "50 Cent's Jet Car" In the first aired episode, 50 Cent orders a Formula One race car to be built in a strict time limit and the brothers face a few security issues which include a break-in.

Episode 2 "50 Cent's Jet Car Takes Off"

Episode 3 "Attack of the Pink & Green Machines"

Episode 4 "Autotrader.com Mars Rover"

Episode 5 "John Cena's Incenarator"

Episode 6 "The Battleship Shredder"
