= Vengeance (2014 film) =

- Directed by: Gil Medina
- Story by: Gil Medina
- Starring: Danny Trejo; Dallas Page; Jason Mewes; 50 Cent; Tech N9ne; Baby Bash
- Release date: February 22, 2014 (United States)
- Running time: 90 minutes
- Country: United States
- Language: English

Vengeance is a 2014 American crime thriller film directed by Gil Medina and starring Danny Trejo and Diamond Dallas Page.

== Premise ==
Jack (Danny Trejo) is a retired cop whose wife and daughter are murdered. He is then sent to prison for a crime he did not commit, however, upon being released he seeks revenge.

== Cast ==
- Danny Trejo as Jack Santos
- Dallas Page as "Spider" Benson
- Jason Mewes as Bobby Mewes
- 50 Cent as Black
- Robert John Burke as Detective Ron Banks
- Tech N9ne as "Choco"
- Baby Bash as Ricardo White
- Donal Logue as "Buzz"

(uncredited)

- Trent Argyle as Ambulance Driver

== Development ==
The first trailer was released on May 22, 2010. The film's director Gil Medina is hoping for the film to receive a theatrical release. Trejo started a campaign for people who give away free copies of the DVD of the film to be given roles in the sequel. The film was released on February 22, 2014 in the United States.
