= SMS Audio =

American headphones manufacturer

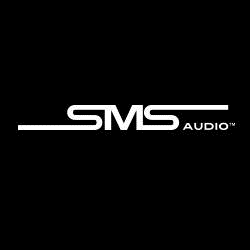
- Type: Private
- Founded: August 2011
- Headquarters: Delray Beach, Florida
- Key people: Curtis Jackson, CEO; Brian Nohe, President
- Website: smsaudio.com www.gunitbrands.com/collections/sms-audio

SMS Audio is an American consumer electronics company that primarily manufactures and markets headphones. The company was founded by 50 Cent in 2011 and acquired Kono Audio that same year.

== History ==
SMS Audio was founded in 2011 by rapper and entrepreneur Curtis Jackson, also known as 50 Cent. SMS stands for "Studio Mastered Sound". Jackson acquired KonoAudio that August for an undisclosed amount in order to rebrand it using his name. KonoAudio's president, Brian Nohe, who founded KonoAudio in 2007, became President of SMS Audio. 50 Cent and former KonoAudio President Brian Nohe designed SMS Audio's first line of headphones in late 2011 and early 2012. In January 2012, DJ Pauly D announced via Twitter that he was partnering with SMS Audio and 50 Cent to develop a new line of headphones. Music artist Timbaland became an investor in SMS Audio in January 2013, which was followed by investments from NBA player Carmelo Anthony in December 2013. In 2016 the SMS audio website was taken down and operations were suspended. As of 2022, their products can be purchased on the G-Unit brands website.

== Products ==
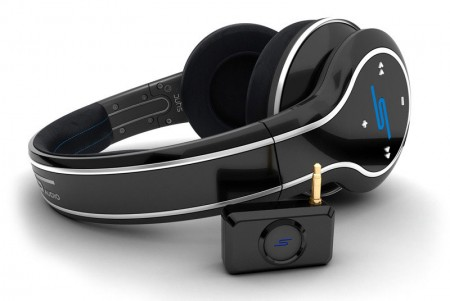
SYNC by 50 headphones with a wireless connector

In October 2012 the "STREET by 50" line of in-ear, over-ear and on-ear headphones were introduced. The wireless SYNC by 50 communicates using proprietary Kleer Wireless Technology, which claims to provide 16-bit CD quality sound with lossless audio, rather than the standard Bluetooth, and can connect to up to four devices within 50 feet.

In late 2013, a STREET by 50 ANC (Active Noise Cancellation) version was introduced, which was followed by a wireless, portable speaker called SYNC by 50 Portable that November. In January 2014, an Audio Sport lineup of headphones were released in collaboration with professional basketball player Carmelo Anthony and a Star Wars themed set of headphones were introduced in partnership with Lucasfilm.

In August 2014, SMS Audio announced the BioSport In-Ear wired earbuds that have "embedded biometric sensors that collect fitness data, including heart rate, without the need for regular charges." SMS Audio is collaborating with Intel for the project.

According to the company website, it also sells SMS Audio-branded apparel and accessories.

== Sponsorships ==
In December 2011, Curtis Jackson announced that a portion of each headphone sold domestically on the SMS Audio website would be donated to the Feeding America initiative.

In 2013, SMS Audio had a sponsorship deal with Israeli basketball club Maccabi Tel Aviv. In February 2014, the company became one of the sponsors of the NASCAR racing team, Swan Racing, which features the SMS Audio logo on its racing cars and on the jackets of some of its racers.
