= Street King (drink) =

Energy drink

- Type: Energy drink
- Manufacturer: Street King LLC
- Introduced: 2011
- Flavour: Strawberry lemonade, grape, berry, pomegranate

Street King was a flavored energy drink created by American rapper Curtis “50 Cent” Jackson and Pure Growth Partners, CEO Chris Clarke.

== Overview ==
Jackson partnered with Pure Growth Partners' Founder and CEO Chris Clarke to launch the product, which through the United Nations World Food Programme (WFP), was intended to provide a meal for a child in Africa with each shot purchased. The product was manufactured and distributed by Street King LLC in New York, NY.

The drink was sold in 74-millilitre (2.5 US fl oz) shots which contain a caffeine amount of 285 mg, comparable to that of 2-3 cups of coffee. Street King was available in orange-mango and grape.

== Philanthropy ==
In September 2011, Jackson publicly committed to donating one billion meals to the World Food Program over five years. If he reaches this goal, Jackson would become the 20th largest donor to the organization. Each meal is covered by a 10 cent donation to the World Food Program for each shot purchased. He donated 3.5 million meals between the launch in September 2011 and January 2012.

== Marketing ==
Street King was rebranded as "SK Energy" in summer 2012. Street King was marketed heavily over social media, including videos with Pauly D and Joan Rivers.

The drink had gained a number of celebrity endorsements, including Joan Rivers; Pauly D; Mike Tyson; Floyd Mayweather; Free agent Wes Welker; Erin Andrews; Colin Kaepernick; J. R. Smith of the Cleveland Cavaliers.

== Losing money ==
SK Energy was losing "millions" of dollars per year, according to Jackson's accountant, in July 2015.
