= The Simpsons future predictions =

Alleged predictions made by the animated television series

Since debuting in 1989, The Simpsons has aired over 800 episodes. Numerous episodes have received news coverage for jokes or storylines that mirrored real-world events years later. Writers and commentators attribute these occurrences to coincidence, noting that a long-running satirical show covering current events will naturally hit on future events.

Writer Stephanie Gillis noted that because the writing staff discusses world news during pitch sessions, occasional overlaps with future headlines are bound to happen.

== Notable examples ==
=== Sports ===
In "Lisa the Greek" (1992), broadcast days before Super Bowl XXVI, the episode picked the Washington Redskins to defeat the Buffalo Bills; Washington won the game 37–24. When reruns aired in subsequent years, staff redubbed the dialogue to name the new Super Bowl contenders, successfully picking the Dallas Cowboys the following year.

The 2010 episode "Boy Meets Curl" depicted the United States men's curling team winning an Olympic gold medal, eight years before the team won its first gold at the 2018 Winter Olympics.

In "You Don't Have to Live Like a Referee" (2014), a storyline about corruption within FIFA aired one year prior to the 2015 FIFA corruption case.

Before the 2016 NCAA Championship Game, a chalkboard gag in "The Burns Cage" read "If Villanova doesn't win, we lose everything." The Villanova Wildcats won the national championship the following day.

=== Politics and government ===
The 2000 episode "Bart to the Future" featured Lisa Simpson as president referencing a budget crisis inherited from "President Trump". Following Donald Trump's victory in the 2016 presidential election, the show acknowledged the line in a chalkboard gag during "Havana Wild Weekend": "Being right sucks."

Media outlets have also noted parallels in "Lisa vs. Malibu Stacy" (1994), which included a news joke about a U.S. president being arrested, and "The Day the Violence Died" (1996), which featured a constitutional amendment cartoon later compared to the January 6 United States Capitol attack. In "Midnight Rx" (2005), characters traveled to Canada for cheap prescription drugs and noted recreational marijuana was legal there, preceding Canadian cannabis legalization in 2018.

=== Entertainment ===
In "When You Dish Upon a Star" (1998), a background sign at 20th Century Fox read "A Division of Walt Disney Co.", 19 years before Disney announced its purchase of 21st Century Fox.

"The Ziff Who Came to Dinner" (2004) featured a movie marquee poster for Matrix 4, 17 years before The Matrix Resurrections was released in 2021.

=== Technology ===
The 2016 episode "Friends and Family" depicted characters using virtual reality headsets in everyday public settings, drawing media comparisons to the launch of the Apple Vision Pro in 2024.

== Explanations and skepticism ==
Showrunner Al Jean noted that supposed predictions are usually educated guesses or coincidences, saying "if you throw enough darts, you're going to get some bullseyes." Former showrunner Bill Oakley similarly attributed them to the show's age and repetition in history.

Fact-checking website Snopes has debunked multiple claims, pointing out that several alleged technological predictions were actually references to existing contemporary technology or older science fiction tropes. For instance, the autocorrect gag in "Lisa on Ice" parodied the Apple Newton's handwriting recognition problems, while wrist communicators had appeared in science fiction decades earlier.
