= Diary (American TV series) =

American documentary TV series (2000–2014)

- Genre: Documentary
- Created by: Jesse Ignjatovic
- Country of origin: United States
- Original language: English

Production
- Camera setup: Single-camera

Original release
- Network: MTV
- Release: February 16, 2000

Diary is an American documentary television series that premiered February 16, 2000, on MTV.

The show's opening titles begin with the slogan "You think you know ... but you have no idea."

== Overview ==
The series follows celebrities through their everyday lives. Some of the celebrities featured include Jay-Z, Aaliyah, Jennifer Lopez, Alicia Keys, Beyoncé Knowles, Kelly Rowland, Marilyn Manson, Bow Wow, Avril Lavigne, Brandy, Britney Spears, Eminem, Christina Aguilera, Pink, Shakira, Chyna, Kelly Clarkson, Brittany Murphy, N.E.R.D, OutKast, Destiny's Child, Lindsay Lohan, Timbaland, Blink-182, Green Day, Sum 41, Papa Roach, Hilary Duff, Korn, Jack Black, Chris Rock, Justin Timberlake, Backstreet Boys, Celine Dion and Enrique Iglesias.

In 2005/2006 MTV Canada produced a series of Canadian made Diary episodes. Canadians featured include Tom Green, Russell Peters, Bedouin Soundclash, Adam Beach, Lauren Collins, Hedley, Amanda Crew, Keshia Chanté, Daniel Negreanu, Nelly Furtado, K'Naan, Billy Talent, Simple Plan and Justin Bieber.

The most recent episode aired in 2014 and centered on Nicki Minaj.

In 2018, MTV Latin America aired an episode centered on Lali Espósito.
