= G-Unit Films and Television Inc. =

American production company

- Type: Private
- Industry: Entertainment
- Founded: 2003
- Headquarters: Shreveport, Louisiana, U.S.
- Key people: Curtis '50 Cent' Jackson (CEO)
- Products: Television programs, films

G-Unit Films and Television Inc. (originally known as G-Unit Films) is an American film and television production company founded by rapper Curtis "50 Cent" Jackson in 2003. The company produced documentaries based on the upbringing of Jackson or his affiliates. In 2008, Jackson founded a successor company, Cheetah Vision, in a joint venture with Randall Emmett, temporarily closing G-Unit Films until its revival in 2010, under the name G-Unit Films and Television Inc.

In 2015, Jackson pitched television prospects to six different networks. Among them was Power, a Starz drama for which Jackson serves as a co‐star, co-creator, and executive producer. Jackson signed a two-year contract with Starz, with representation from the Agency for the Performing Arts. By the following year, ratings have proved successful for the network.

Following his dissatisfaction with the Starz network, Jackson and Fox entered a non-exclusive broadcast direct deal to develop scripted dramas, live-action comedies and animated series through his production company G-Unit Film & Television. In 2023, Jackson purchased an in-house production facility (which was known as Millennium Studios) for the company, in a lease agreement with the city of Shreveport, Louisiana.

== Filmography ==
=== Films ===
- 50 Cent: The New Breed (2003)
- The Game: Documentary (2005)
- Get Rich or Die Tryin' (2005)
- Before I Self Destruct (2009)
- Caught in the Crossfire (2010)
- Gun (2010)
- All Things Fall Apart (2011)
- Blood Out (2011)
- Setup (2011)
- Freelancers (2012)
- Fire with Fire (2012)
- The Frozen Ground (2013)
- Den of Thieves 2: Pantera (2025)
- Moses the Black (2026)
- Den of Thieves 3 (2027)

=== Television ===
- Dream School (2013)
- Power (2014–2020)
- 50 Central (2017)
- The Oath (2017–2019)
- For Life (2020–2021)
- Power Book II: Ghost (2020–2024)
- Power Book III: Raising Kanan (2021–2026)
- Black Mafia Family (2021–2025)
- The BMF Documentary: Blowing Money Fast (2022–2026)
- Hip Hop Homicides (2022)
- Power Book IV: Force (2022–2026)
- Sean Combs: The Reckoning (2025)
- The Gilgo Beach Killer: House of Secrets (2026)
- Fightland (2026-Current)
- Power: Origins (Upcoming)
- Power: Legacy (Upcoming)
