= Sydney Hall =

Sydney or Sidney Hall may refer to:

- Sydney Prior Hall (1842–1922), British portrait painter and illustrator
- Sydney Hall (actor) (born 1975), African-American actor
- Sidney Hall (1788–1831), British engraver
- The Vanishing of Sidney Hall, a 2017 American drama film

== See also ==
- Syd Hall (disambiguation)
