= Planetary Traveler =

Soundtrack album by Paul Haslinger
- Released: 1998
- Genre: Electronic
- Length: 44:50
- Label: Third Planet Entertainment
- Producer: Paul Haslinger, Jan C. Nickman

Paul Haslinger chronology
| Hidden (1997) | Planetary Traveler (1998) | Score (1999) |

Professional ratings
Review scores
| Source | Rating |
|---|---|
| Allmusic | 4.5/5 stars |

Planetary Traveler is a soundtrack album by Paul Haslinger, for a film of the same name, released in 1998 through Third Planet Entertainment.

== Track listing ==
All music is composed by Paul Haslinger

| No. | Title | Length |
|---|---|---|
| 1. | "Traces of Infinity" | 4:02 |
| 2. | "Spacedrift 60-23" | 4:36 |
| 3. | "Extropy" | 4:15 |
| 4. | "Idhourin: The Companions" | 3:21 |
| 5. | "E'iah: Foster Nest" | 4:14 |
| 6. | "Lhodwi: Frozen Chaos" | 2:34 |
| 7. | "Glaren: Desert Motion" | 2:22 |
| 8. | "Infinity's Child" | 3:51 |
| 9. | "Dilgan: Burning Life" | 1:14 |
| 10. | "Ouwurkappa: Mother Ocean" | 3:18 |
| 11. | "Dharmok: Bridging the Gap" | 6:56 |
| 12. | "The Remains of Time" | 4:07 |

== Personnel ==
- Bill Ellsworth – cover art
- Christopher Franke – arrangement
- Paul Haslinger – instruments, production, engineering, mixing
- Jan C. Nickman – production
- Mitch Zelezny – mastering, engineering, mixing
- Desmond Starr World Creator & Animator;– general art
