= Syd Hall =

Syd Hall may refer to:

- Syd Hall (footballer born 1879) (1879–1946), Australian rules footballer for Essendon
- Syd Hall (footballer born 1902) (1902–1973), Australian rules footballer for Geelong

== See also ==
- Sydney Hall (disambiguation)
- Sidney Hall, engraver
