= Elle Chapman =

American actress

- Born: May 26, 1999 (age 27); Alexandria, Virginia, U.S.
- Occupation: Actress
- Years active: 2021–present

Elle Chapman is an American actress, best known for her role as Paige McIntosh in The Madison (2026).

== Biography ==
Chapman was born in Alexandria, Virginia. She has two sisters and one brother. When she was four her family moved to New York City. The family later moved to Turkey and then to the Netherlands. They returned to Virginia when she was 11, following her father's brain cancer diagnosis. Her father died the following year when she was 12.

After moving to Los Angeles Chapman did some modelling. She also took on catering gigs and worked as a skateboarding coach.

She was later part of The Groundlings, an improv comedy troupe who has many notable alumni.

== Career ==
In 2021 she appeared in a music video Lo Siento BB:/ by Tainy, Bad Bunny and Julieta Venegas.

Chapman acted as Caisey in a Western called Florida Wild, and as a train ticketer in A Man Called Otto.

In 2026 she started acting as Paige McIntosh in The Madison alongside Michelle Pfeiffer and Beau Garrett.

== Filmography ==
=== Film ===
Year	Title	Role	Notes
2022	A Man Called Otto	Sarah	
2022	The Love Suite	Haven	short
2023	Supermodel	Annabella	short
2024	Shark Girl	Asheley	
2024	The Ballad of Rose Mae	Elizabeth Gray	short
2025	Magnus the Magnificent	Charlotte	short

=== Television ===
Year	Title	Role	Notes
2022	The Girl in the Mirror	Laura (voice)	1 episode
2026 - present	The Madison	Paige McIntosh	main role
2026	American Horror Story	Ashley	3 episodes

=== Music videos ===
Year	Title	artists	Notes
2021	Lo Siento BB:/	Tainy, Bad Bunny, Julieta Venegas	
