= Future Primitive =

Future Primitive may refer to:

== Literature ==
- Future Primitive and Other Essays, a 1994 book by John Zerzan
- Future Primitive: The New Ecotopias, a 1994 short-story collection edited by Kim Stanley Robinson

== Music ==
- Bush (British band), originally Future Primitive, an English rock band
- Future Primitive (Paul Haslinger album) or the title song, 1994
- Future Primitive (The Vines album) or the title song, 2011
- "Future Primitive", a song by Grails from Deep Politics, 2011
- "Future Primitive", a song by Santana from Caravanserai, 1972
- "Future Primitive", a song by Sum 41 from Heaven :x: Hell, 2024

== Other uses ==
- Future Primitive, a 1985 skateboarding video by Powell Peralta
- Future Primitive, a 2006–2020 podcast by Joanna Harcourt-Smith
