= Night music =

Night music may refer to:

== Film and theater ==
- Night Music (play), a 1940 play by Clifford Odets
- A Little Night Music, a 1973 musical by Stephen Sondheim and Hugh Wheeler
- A Little Night Music (film), 1977 film adaptation of the musical
- Night Music, a 1986 experimental film by Stan Brakhage

== Albums and songs ==
- "Night Music", a 1990 song by the heavy metal band Dio from the album Lock Up the Wolves
- Nachtmusik (album), a 1990 album by Lightwave
- Night Music (Joe Jackson album), 1994
- Night Music (Woody Shaw album)
- "Night Music", a 1995 song by Simple Minds from the album Good News from the Next World

== Other ==
- Night Music (1988-1990), a TV series hosted by David Sanborn featuring musicians from a wide variety of genres
- Eine kleine Nachtmusik (A Little Night Music), a 1787 composition by Wolfgang Amadeus Mozart
- Night music (Bartók), a stylistic evocation of night, found in the music of the Hungarian composer Béla Bartók
- nocturne, usually a musical composition that is inspired by, or evocative of, the night
- Night Music, a composition by George Crumb
- Nachtmusique, wind instruments early music ensemble
- Nightmusic (short story), a 1972 short story by Joyce Carol Oates
