= Hidden (Coma Virus album) =

Studio album by Coma Virus
- Released: December 1996
- Genre: Electronic
- Length: 50:59
- Label: Side Effects
- Producer: Paul Haslinger

Paul Haslinger chronology
World Without Rules (1996)	Hidden (1996)	Planetary Traveler (1998)

Professional ratings
Review scores
Source	Rating
Allmusic	3/5 stars

Hidden is the third album by Paul Haslinger, released in 1996 through Side Effects.

== Track listing ==
All music is composed by Paul Haslinger

No.	Title	Length
1.	"Lower Than Epsilon"	10:56
2.	"Arcana Mundi"	16:45
3.	"Causality"	7:45
4.	"The Thirty Seals"	15:33

== Personnel ==
- John Bergin – cover art
- Thomas Dimuzio – instruments
- Paul Haslinger – instruments, production
- Loren Nerell – instruments
- David Torn – instruments
