= Lightwave (band) =

Background information
- Origin: Paris, France
- Genres: Ambient music
- Years active: 1984–present
- Members: Christoph Harbonnier; Christian Wittman
- Website: www.lightwave-musique.com

Lightwave is the ambient music project of keyboardist Serge Leroy, founded in 1984 in Paris, France. They have collaborated with a plethora of artists, such as Hector Zazou, Michel Redolfi, Jon Hassell and Paul Haslinger.

== History ==
Lightwave was originally conceived as an electronic music trio consisting of Serge Leroy, Laurent Bozeck and Christian Jacob (later Wittman). In 1988, Lightwave was re-established as a duo comprising musicians Christoph Harbonnier and Christian Wittman.

The first CD album by the newly formed Lightwave was released in 1990 under the title Nachtmusik for German Erdenklang. In 1993, it was the turn of Tycho Brahé with the help of the violinist Jacques Deregnaucourt, Hector Zazou and Paul Haslinger member of Tangerine Dream. The album, dedicated to the Danish astronomer of the same name, is an innovative blend of cosmic music and ambient music.

In 1995 Mundus Subterraneus, an album of what is considered their magnum opus, was published by Hearts of Space Records. The group, now a quartet, was inspired to create a guide to a journey into the bowels of Vesuvius by Athanasius Kircher, a philosopher of the seventeenth century. The album is a succession of sounds that evoke terrifying nightmares, symbolic journey into the bowels of the Earth, but represents collectively a journey in the human unconscious.

The returning duo of Wittman and Harbonnier continued the work begun with the sound research of Mundus Subterraneus in subsequent albums: In Der Unterwelt (1996), consists of a single 20-minute suite, published by Plan Sonores; Cantus Umbrarum (1999), recorded within the Choranche caves in the Vercors region (France) on the occasion of Rugissants Festival of Grenoble, and Caryotype (2001) consisting of a suite in eleven movements.

In 2004, the group turns to chamber music for the album Bleue Comme Une Orange. Inspired by the works of Alexander Scriabin, the group uses classical instruments to a greater extent and featured the participation of Jon Hassell.

Their concerts and recordings of their records are the result of research of particular locations like the concert at the Gasometer in Oberhausen in Germany, and in the large domed observatory of Bischoffsheim Nice during the recording of the live album Uranography at M.A.N.C.A. (Musiques Actuelles Nice Côte d'Azur) Festival.

== Musical style ==
With a jovial approach to old and new electronic stringed instruments and sound materials, Lightwave focused on exploring poetic and sensual worlds, playing with sounds as with colors, shapes, concrete objects or spatial dimensions. The duo favored mixing live electronic with acoustic instruments, performing impromptu compositions that were built on listening and sharing, similar in to a jazz trio or string quartet. Lightwave utilized analog synthesizers such as Polymoog, Oberheim and RSF Polykobol to craft their music.

== Discography ==
- Nachtmusik (1990)
- Tycho Brahé (1994)
- Mundus Subterraneus (1995)
- Uranography (1996)
- Cantus Umbrarum (2000)
- Caryotype (2001)
- Bleue comme une orange (2004)
