= Mundus Subterraneus (album) =

Studio album by Lightwave
- Released: January 1995
- Recorded: January – December 1994
- Studio: Les Nouvelles Musiques Électroniques (Montreuil, France)
- Genre: Ambient
- Length: 65:42
- Label: Fathom
- Producer: Paul Haslinger

Lightwave chronology
Tycho Brahé (1993)	Mundus Subterraneus (1995)	Cantus Umbrarum (2000)

Professional ratings
Review scores
Source	Rating
Allmusic	4.5/5 stars

Mundus Subterraneus is the third studio album by Lightwave, released in November 1995 by Fathom Records.

== Track listing ==
All music is composed by Christoph Harbonnier, Paul Haslinger and Christian Wittman.

No.	Title	Length
1.	"De Motu Pendulorum"	4:48
2.	"Cabinet de Curiosités 1"	4:58
3.	"Cabinet de Curiosités 2"	3:54
4.	"Nekyomanteia"	5:29
5.	"Sonnenstürme"	9:21
6.	"Towards the Abyss"	9:16
7.	"Glissement d'âme"	9:43
8.	"Roma Barocca"	6:58
9.	"Ascension"	6:22
10.	"Mapping the Earth"	4:53

== Personnel ==
Adapted from the Mundus Subterraneus liner notes.

Lightwave

- Christoph Harbonnier – electronics, engineering
- Paul Haslinger – electronics, production, engineering, mixing
- Christian Wittman – electronics, Co-producer

Additional musicians

- Charlie Campagna – guitar, loops
- Jacques Derégnaucourt – electronics, violin, viola, voice

Production and additional personnel

- Stephen Hill – art direction

== Release history ==
Region	Date	Label	Format	Catalog
United States	1995	Fathom	CD	HS11058
United States	2006	Horizon Music	CD	HM-1010
