= World Without Rules =

Studio album by Paul Haslinger
- Released: August 20, 1996
- Genre: Electronic
- Length: 59:39
- Label: RGB
- Producer: Mitch Zelezny

Paul Haslinger chronology
Future Primitive (1994)	World Without Rules (1996)	Hidden (1997)

Professional ratings
Review scores
Source	Rating
Allmusic	4/5 stars

World Without Rules is the second studio album by Paul Haslinger, released on August 20, 1996 by RGB Records.

== Track listing ==
All music is composed by Paul Haslinger

No.	Title	Length
1.	"World Without Rules"	7:34
2.	"Urban Source Code"	6:02
3.	"Dismissal of the Hemisphere"	5:33
4.	"Monkey Brain Sushi"	2:51
5.	"Be-Bop in Baghdad"	7:01
6.	"Asian Blue"	5:34
7.	"Desert Diva"	6:28
8.	"Rainmaker's Dream"	5:04
9.	"Le Sens du Sens"	4:44
10.	"Global Ghetto"	4:28
11.	"The Closing of the Circle"	4:20

== Personnel ==
Musicians

- Charlie Campagna – guitar on "World Without Rules"
- Paul Haslinger – instruments, engineering
- Nona Hendryx – vocals on "World Without Rules", "Be-Bop in Baghdad" and "Global Ghetto"
- Anna Homler – vocals on "Monkey Brain Sushi" and "Rainmaker's Dream"
- Mark Isham – trumpet and flugelhorn on "Urban Source Code", "Be-Bop in Baghdad" and "Asian Blue"
- Loren Nerell – gamelan on "Dismissal of the Hemisphere"
- S'Ange – vocals on "Desert Diva"
- Steve Whalen – bass guitar on "Urban Source Code", "Be-Bop in Baghdad", "Desert Diva" and "Global Ghetto"

Production and additional personnel

- Stephen Hill – mastering, art direction
- Bob Olhsson – mastering
- Rex Ray – photography, design
- Mitch Zelezny – production, mixing
