= Tycho Brahé =

Studio album by Lightwave
- Released: 1993
- Recorded: May 1992 – March 1993
- Studio: Les Nouvelles Musiques Électroniques (Montreuil, France)
- Genre: Dark ambient
- Length: 57:33
- Label: Crystal Lake
- Producer: Lightwave

Lightwave chronology
Nachtmusik (1990)	Tycho Brahé (1993)	Mundus Subterraneus (1995)

Professional ratings
Review scores
Source	Rating
Allmusic	4/5 stars

Tycho Brahé is the second studio album by Lightwave, released in 1993 by Crystal Lake.

== Track listing ==
No.	Title	Writer(s)	Length
1.	"Uraniborg"	Christoph Harbonnier, Christian Wittman	16:59
2.	"Mapping the Sky"	Christoph Harbonnier, Paul Haslinger, Christian Wittman	4:53
3.	"Cathedral"	Christoph Harbonnier, Paul Haslinger, Christian Wittman	5:19
4.	"Fuga Stellarum"	Christoph Harbonnier, Christian Wittman, Hector Zazou	4:34
5.	"Virtual Mechanics"	Christoph Harbonnier, Christian Wittman	3:56
6.	"Poetics of the Sphere"	Christoph Harbonnier, Christian Wittman	4:17
7.	"The Art of Clockmakers"	Christoph Harbonnier, Christian Wittman	3:54
8.	"Tycho on the Moon"	Christoph Harbonnier, Paul Haslinger, Christian Wittman	6:08
9.	"Apogée"	Christoph Harbonnier, Paul Haslinger, Christian Wittman	3:57
10.	"Hymn for the Guild of Astronomers"	Christoph Harbonnier, Christian Wittman, Hector Zazou	3:36

== Personnel ==
Adapted from the Tycho Brahé liner notes.

Lightwave

- Christoph Harbonnier – synthesizer
- Christian Wittman – synthesizer

Additional musicians

- Jacques Derégnaucourt – violin (1, 3, 9)
- Paul Haslinger – synthesizer (2, 3, 8, 9)
- Renaud Pion – clarinet (10)
- Hector Zazou – synthesizer (10)

Production and additional personnel

- Serge Leroy – mixing, recording
- Lightwave – production, mixing, recording
- MicroCosmos – illustrations, design
- Bob Olhsson – mastering
- Andreas Pfeiffer – illustrations, design

== Release history ==
Region	Date	Label	Format	Catalog
France	1993	Crystal Lake	CD	CL-93291
United States	1994	Fathom	CD	HS11044
United States	2006	Horizon Music	CD	HM-1009
