= Kalamity (film) =

- Film poster
- Directed by: James M. Hausler
- Written by: James M. Hausler
- Produced by: Juliana Penaranda
- Starring: Nick Stahl; Jonathan Jackson; Beau Garrett
- Cinematography: Jim Hunter
- Edited by: James M. Hausler; Chris Lorusso
- Music by: Christopher Mangum
- Production company: Beat Pirate Films
- Distributed by: Original 4 Releasing; Screen Media Films
- Release date: October 22, 2010 (Los Angeles)
- Running time: 98 minutes
- Country: United States
- Language: English

Kalamity is a 2010 American psychological thriller film starring Nick Stahl, Jonathan Jackson and Beau Garrett.

== Cast ==
- Nick Stahl as Billy Klepack
- Jonathan Jackson as Stanley Keller
- Christopher M. Clark as Christian Phillips
- Beau Garrett as Alice
- Robert Forster as Tom Klepack
- Alona Tal as Ashley
- Patricia Kalember as Terry Klepack
- Sammi Hanratty as Barbie Klepack

== Reception ==
The film has a 0% rating on Rotten Tomatoes. On Metacritic, the film has a score of 28 out of a 100 based on 11 critics, indicating "generally unfavorable" reviews.

Glenn Heath Jr. of Slant Magazine gave the film one and a half stars out of four, explaining his rating by "The brooding main characters in James M. Hausler's Kalamity take indulgent suffering to another level".

Frank Scheck of The Hollywood Reporter called the film "[a] pallid, unconvincing thriller" that "carries the battle between the sexes to literal extremes".
