= Gabriel Casseus =

American actor

- Born: April 28, 1972 (age 53); New York City, U.S.
- Occupation: Actor
- Years active: 1993–present

Gabriel Casseus (born April 28, 1972) is an American actor from Roosevelt, New York.

== Biography ==
Casseus was born in New York City and is of Haitian descent.

At the age of 23 Casseus was nominated for the 1995 Independent Spirit Award for Best Debut Performance in the film New Jersey Drive. He has appeared in the films Get on the Bus, Fallen, and Black Dog.

He had roles as pool-playing Freddie in the 50 Cent movie Before I Self Destruct (2009), as Elliot's cellmate in Bedazzled, and as Army Ranger Kurth in Black Hawk Down.

Casseus has appeared on television shows including Grey's Anatomy, CSI: Miami, CSI: NY, The Practice, Law & Order and 24.

He is a co-writer of the 2010 film Takers.

== Filmography ==
Year	Title	Role	Notes	Rating
1994–1997	New York Undercover	Multiple-roles	TV series	TV-14
1995	New Jersey Drive	Midget	Movie	R
1995	Law & Order	Dewey Latterman	TV series 1 episode	TV-14
1995	Silk Stalkings	Deon Wilkes	TV series 1 episode	TV-14
1996	Homicide: Life on the Street	Derek Sherman	TV series 1 episode	TV-14
1996	The Parent 'Hood	Bobby	TV series 1 episode	TV-PG
1996	Lone Star	Young Otis	Movie	R
1996	Nightjohn	Outlaw	Movie	PG-13
1996	Get on the Bus	Jamal	Movie	R
1997	Don King: Only In America	Jeremiah Shabazz	TV movie	R
1997	Buffalo Soldiers	Wesley	Movie	TV-14
1998	Fallen	Art Hobbes	Movie	R
1998	The Wedding	Hannibal	Movie	NR
1998	Modern Vampires	Time Bomb	Movie	R
1998	Black Dog	Sonny Boxer	Movie	PG-13
1999	The Crow: Stairway to Heaven	Rodney	TV series	NR
1999	Harlem Aria	Anton	Movie	R
2000	Lockdown	Cashmere	Movie	R
2000	Bedazzled	God	Movie	PG-13
2001	15 Minutes	Unique	Movie	R
2001	Black Hawk Down	SPC Mike Kurth	Movie	R
2002	Ritual	J.B.	Movie	R
2009	24 (Season 7)	Robert Galvez	TV Series	TV-14
2009	Dough Boys	Simuel	Movie	R
2009	G-Force	Special Agent Carter	Movie	PG
2009	Before I Self Destruct	Freddie	Movie	R
2012	Brothers in Arms	Linc	Movie	R
2012	“Gang Of Roses 2: Next Generation”	Lee	Movie	R
2017	Chocolate City: Vegas Strip	Tone	Movie	R

== Bibliography ==
- One Square Mile: The History of Roosevelt, NY from an Autobiographical Perspective. Sheldon Parrish. ISBN 978-1-44155-568-7
