= The Madison (TV series) =

2026 American television series

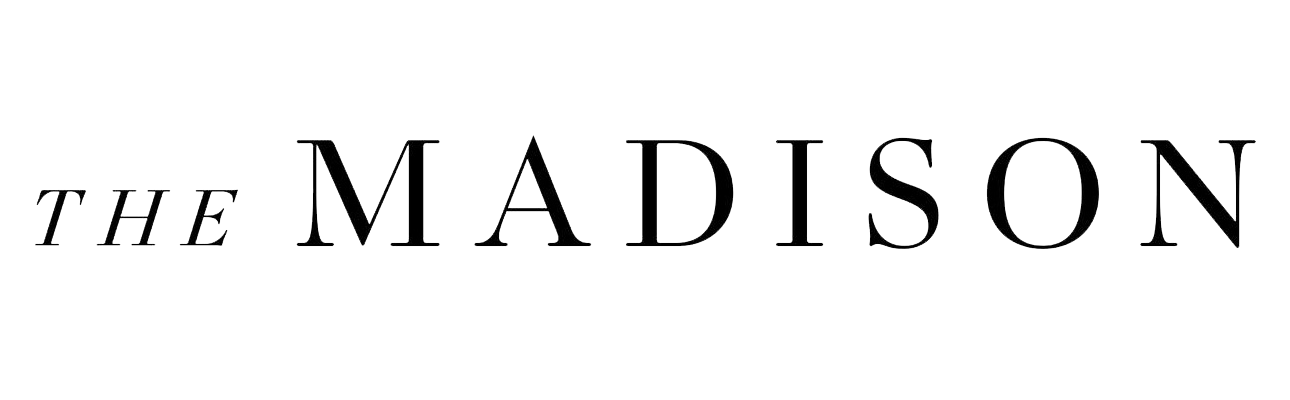
- Genre: Contemporary Western; Family drama
- Created by: Taylor Sheridan
- Showrunner: Taylor Sheridan
- Written by: Taylor Sheridan
- Directed by: Christina Alexandra Voros
- Starring: Michelle Pfeiffer; Kurt Russell; Beau Garrett; Patrick J. Adams; Elle Chapman; Amiah Miller; Alaina Pollack; Ben Schnetzer; Kevin Zegers; Rebecca Spence; Matthew Fox
- Music by: Breton Vivian
- Country of origin: United States
- No. of seasons: 1
- No. of episodes: 6

Production
- Executive producers: Taylor Sheridan; David C. Glasser; John Linson; Art Linson; Ron Burkle; David Hutkin; Bob Yari; Michael Friedman; Christina Alexandra Voros; Michelle Pfeiffer; Kurt Russell
- Cinematography: Christina Alexandra Voros
- Editor: Chad Galster
- Running time: 46–68 minutes
- Production companies: Paramount Television Studios; Linson Entertainment; Bosque Ranch Productions; 101 Studios

Original release
- Network: Paramount+
- Release: March 14, 2026 – present

The Madison is a contemporary Western and family drama television series created by Taylor Sheridan for Paramount+. Michelle Pfeiffer and Kurt Russell lead the series, alongside main stars Beau Garrett, Patrick J. Adams, Elle Chapman, Amiah Miller, Alaina Pollack, Ben Schnetzer, Kevin Zegers, Rebecca Spence, and Matthew Fox.

The first season of The Madison was released in two batches of three episodes each across March 14 and 21, 2026. In August 2025 and April 2026, before its first-season premiere, The Madison was renewed for a second and third season, respectively. The second season in planned to premiere in 2027.

== Premise ==
The series follows the Clyburn family, originally from New York City, who relocate to the Madison River valley of southwest Montana for emotional recovery following the unexpected death of the family patriarch that both shocks and permanently changes the family.

== Cast and characters ==
=== Main ===
- Michelle Pfeiffer as Stacy Clyburn, the matriarch of the Clyburn family and Preston's widow
- Kurt Russell as Preston Clyburn, the patriarch of the Clyburn family and Stacy's husband
- Beau Garrett as Abigail Reese, Stacy and Preston's divorced elder daughter, and the mother of Bridgette and Macy Reese
- Patrick J. Adams as Russell McIntosh, Paige's husband, and Stacy and Preston's son-in-law
- Elle Chapman as Paige McIntosh, Stacy and Preston's younger daughter and Russell's wife
- Amiah Miller as Bridgette Reese, Abigail's elder daughter, and Stacy and Preston's eldest grandchild
- Alaina Pollack as Macy Reese, Abigail's younger daughter, and Stacy and Preston's younger grandchild
- Ben Schnetzer as Van Davis, the deputy sheriff of the Madison River valley
- Kevin Zegers as Cade Harris, Stacy and Preston's neighbor
- Rebecca Spence as Liliana Weeks, Stacy's friend
- Matthew Fox as Paul Clyburn (season 1), Preston's brother and Stacy's brother-in-law

=== Guest ===
- Brent Sexton as Scott Waverly
- Danielle Vasinova as Kestrel Harris
- Najiah Knight as Kayla Harris
- Will Arnett as Dr. Phil Yorn
- Sophia Esperanza as Chexy
- Dawn Olivieri as Ellen
- Tanc Sade as Dallas Reese, Abigail's ex-husband and Bridgette and Macy's father
- Kwame Patterson as Watch Commander Dwight Haney
- Gloria Votsis as Chelsea
- Emma Duncan as Leah
- J. August Richards as Jeff

== Episodes ==
=== Series overview ===
Season	Episodes	Originally released	
Season	Episodes	First released	Last released
1	6	March 14, 2026	March 21, 2026
2	6	2027	2027

=== Season 1 (2026) ===
No. overall	No. in season	Title	Directed by	Written by	Original release date
1	1	"Pilot"	Christina Alexandra Voros	Taylor Sheridan	March 14, 2026
After her husband Preston and his brother Paul are killed in a plane crash, New Yorker Stacy Clyburn travels with her family to a ranch outside Bozeman, Montana, where the two men frequently stayed. As they begin to process their grief, Stacy must also navigate the practical realities of arranging funerary services in Montana for both her husband and brother-in-law.
2	2	"Let the Land Hold Me"	Christina Alexandra Voros	Taylor Sheridan	March 14, 2026
Haunted by memories of dismissing Preston's attachment to the ranch, Stacy grapples with mounting guilt as her family struggles with the realities of staying in rural Montana. Their discomfort with the ranch's lack of luxuries heightens tensions, leading to an emotional outburst from Stacy directed at her eldest daughter, Abigail. During this time, Stacy meets her neighbor, Cade Harris, who brings food as a gift from his family. After her granddaughters criticize Cade's use of the term "Indian," Stacy later admonishes them, emphasizing that it is impolite to insult those who extend kindness. She later declares her intention to leave her life in New York behind and move permanently to the ranch.
3	3	"Watch Her Fall"	Christina Alexandra Voros	Taylor Sheridan	March 14, 2026
Tensions between Abigail and her sister Paige escalate into a physical altercation as the strain of their circumstances deepens. Meanwhile, Paige's husband Russell takes his nieces to explore the ranch. Out of concern for her daughter's uncertain future, Stacy asks Abigail to either remain on the ranch with her or risk losing her financial support. Abigail reacts angrily and leaves the car, ultimately finding herself stranded on the road. She is picked up by deputy sheriff Van Davis, and the two quickly become smitten with each other.
4	4	"Tomorrow Is Goodbye"	Christina Alexandra Voros	Taylor Sheridan	March 21, 2026
Stacy's best friend, Liliana, arrives at the ranch to offer emotional support and assist with funeral arrangements. Deputy sheriff Van Davis calls a meeting with the family to share difficult information recovered from the flight recorder, revealing the brothers' final words. Later, Stacy uses Preston's journal as a guide to learn how to fish, while Van and Abigail continue to grow closer.
5	5	"No Name and a New Dream"	Christina Alexandra Voros	Taylor Sheridan	March 21, 2026
The day of the funeral arrives, and Preston and Paul are laid to rest on a patch of land overlooking the Madison River, in accordance with Preston's final wishes. Following the burial, Van reluctantly ends his relationship with Abigail, recognizing that their worlds are incompatible. Feeling a sense of duty toward her family, Stacy returns to New York with them and, following Liliana's suggestion, visits an unconventional therapist whose guidance begins to resonate, even as much of her grief remains unprocessed.
6	6	"I Give Me Permission"	Christina Alexandra Voros	Taylor Sheridan	March 21, 2026
Preston's journal offers insight into his brother Paul's struggles with grief. Liliana organizes a memorial service for Preston at Stacy's New York townhouse, though Stacy later confesses her fear of attending. Meanwhile, Paige confronts a coworker who makes a disrespectful remark about Preston, striking her in anger; Stacy intervenes and persuades the coworker not to press charges. Following guidance from her therapist, Stacy avoids the memorial and disappears into the night. The next day, Cade discovers her sleeping beside Preston's grave, and upon waking, Stacy suggests that she has returned to the ranch to stay.

=== Season 2 ===
No. overall	No. in season	Title	Directed by	Written by	Original release date
7	1	"Beneath the River, Stars"	Christina Alexandra Voros	Taylor Sheridan	2027
8	2	"A Quiet Noise"	Christina Alexandra Voros	Taylor Sheridan	2027
9	3	"A Stuffed Animal With a Soul"	Christina Alexandra Voros	Taylor Sheridan	2027
10	4	"The War Against Raindrops"	Christina Alexandra Voros	Taylor Sheridan	2027
11	5	"Pocketful of Quarters"	Christina Alexandra Voros	Taylor Sheridan	2027
12	6	"The Mud of the Real"	Christina Alexandra Voros	Taylor Sheridan	2027

== Production ==
=== Development ===
In February 2023, it was announced that Taylor Sheridan was in the process of creating a contemporary spin-off and sequel to the Paramount Network series Yellowstone, which he co-created with John Linson. It was developed following failed contract negotiations with Kevin Costner, Yellowstone's leading actor, over his filming schedule for what would become its fifth and final season. Costner was willing to commit little time to the series amid availability conflicts with Horizon: An American Saga, a film quartet he created, wrote, directed, and starred in. This reportedly led to frustration for Sheridan and lower morale among the remainder of the cast. The spin-off was ordered straight-to-series in May. Although the name was initially expected to carry the Yellowstone branding in it, the show was later given a working title of 2024 in November, following the same format as Yellowstone's prequels, 1883, 1923, and the in-development 1944.

The series was eventually retitled The Madison. Series stars Michelle Pfeiffer and Kurt Russell signed on as an executive producer alongside Sheridan, David C. Glasser, John Linson, Art Linson, Ron Burkle, Bob Yari, David Hutkin, Christina Alexandra Voros, Michael Friedman and Keith Cox; from production companies 101 Studios, MTV Entertainment Studios, and Bosque Ranch Productions. Following the merger of Paramount Global, MTV Entertainment Studios' parent company, with Skydance Media in Paramount Skydance, Paramount Television Studios took over production of the series. In August 2025, the series was renewed for a second season. When the trailer for the series was released, Paramount+ announced that The Madison would actually be a stand-alone series not connected to the Yellowstone franchise. The first two seasons consist of six episodes each, an unusual order for Sheridan's seasons that typically span 8 or 10 episodes. Although The Madison currently takes the form of a limited-run series, cast and crew members remained hopeful for a third season.

In April 2026, ahead of the second season premiere, Paramount+ renewed the series for a third season.

=== Casting ===
When the series was first announced, Matthew McConaughey was in negotiations to star, along with returning cast members from Yellowstone. The returning cast members had received offers to appear; however, the contracts would not be finalized until writing on that series was complete. McConaughey's interest in the series arose after he began watching Yellowstone and had a conversation with Sheridan about working on a similar project. Prior to it being repurposed into an independent program, Sheridan decided against including any existing characters early in its development process so that a stand-alone story could be told, once again following a format he explored in Yellowstone's prequels.

Despite this, Luke Grimes, Cole Hauser, Kelly Reilly were at one-time also in negotiations to reprise their roles, after he revealed that decision, because the idea was brought up to him as a way to connect the two shows. Pfeiffer, Kurt Russell, and Patrick J. Adams entered into negotiations around the same time, and McConaughey declined to commit until a teleplay was provided. Hauser and Reilly, described as "quasi-leads" of Yellowstone, both sought significant pay increases to return. Reilly initially requested $1.5 million an episode, which was later negotiated down to $1.2 million. Hauser wished for $1.25 million for each episode, higher than the $700,000 he earned in Yellowstone; Paramount however, was only willing to offer him $850,000 for the first season, rising to $950,000 in season two, with a guarantee for both seasons.

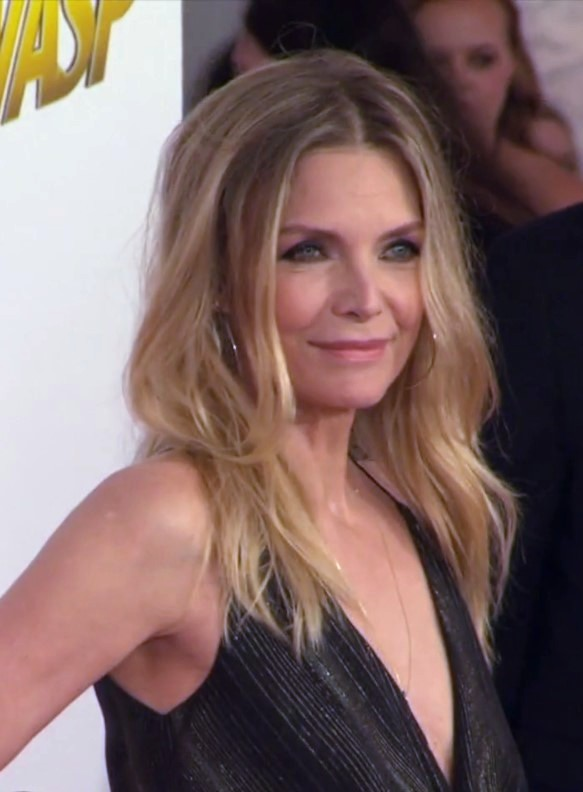
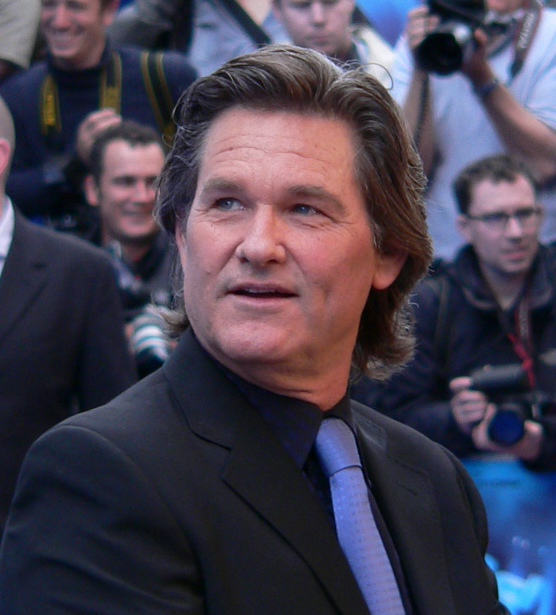
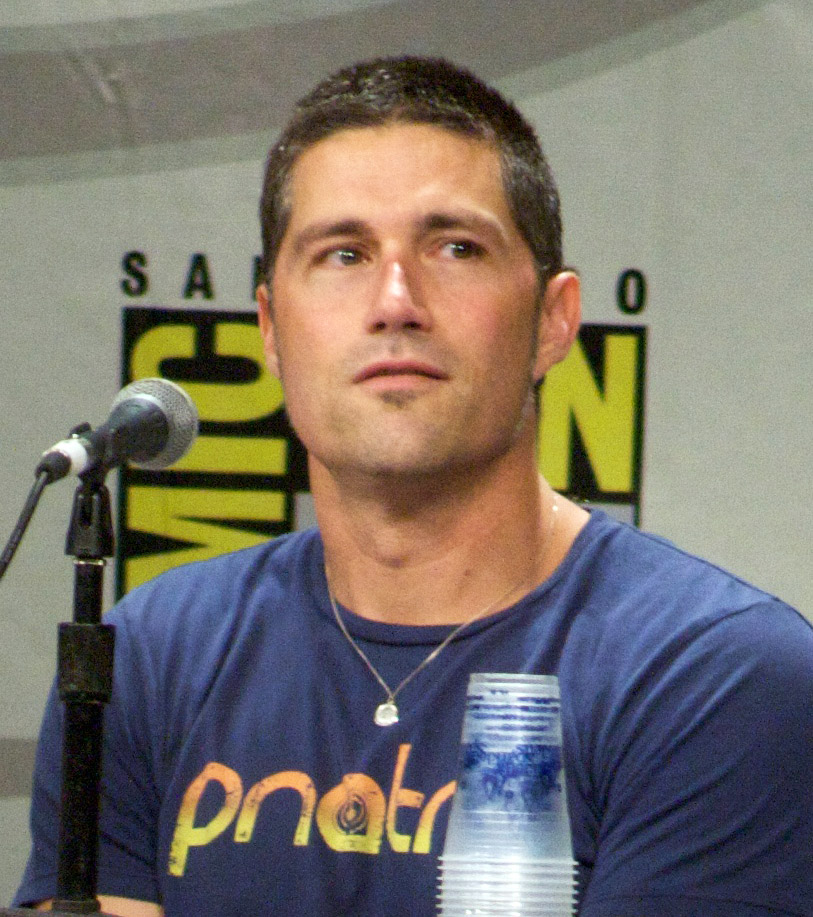
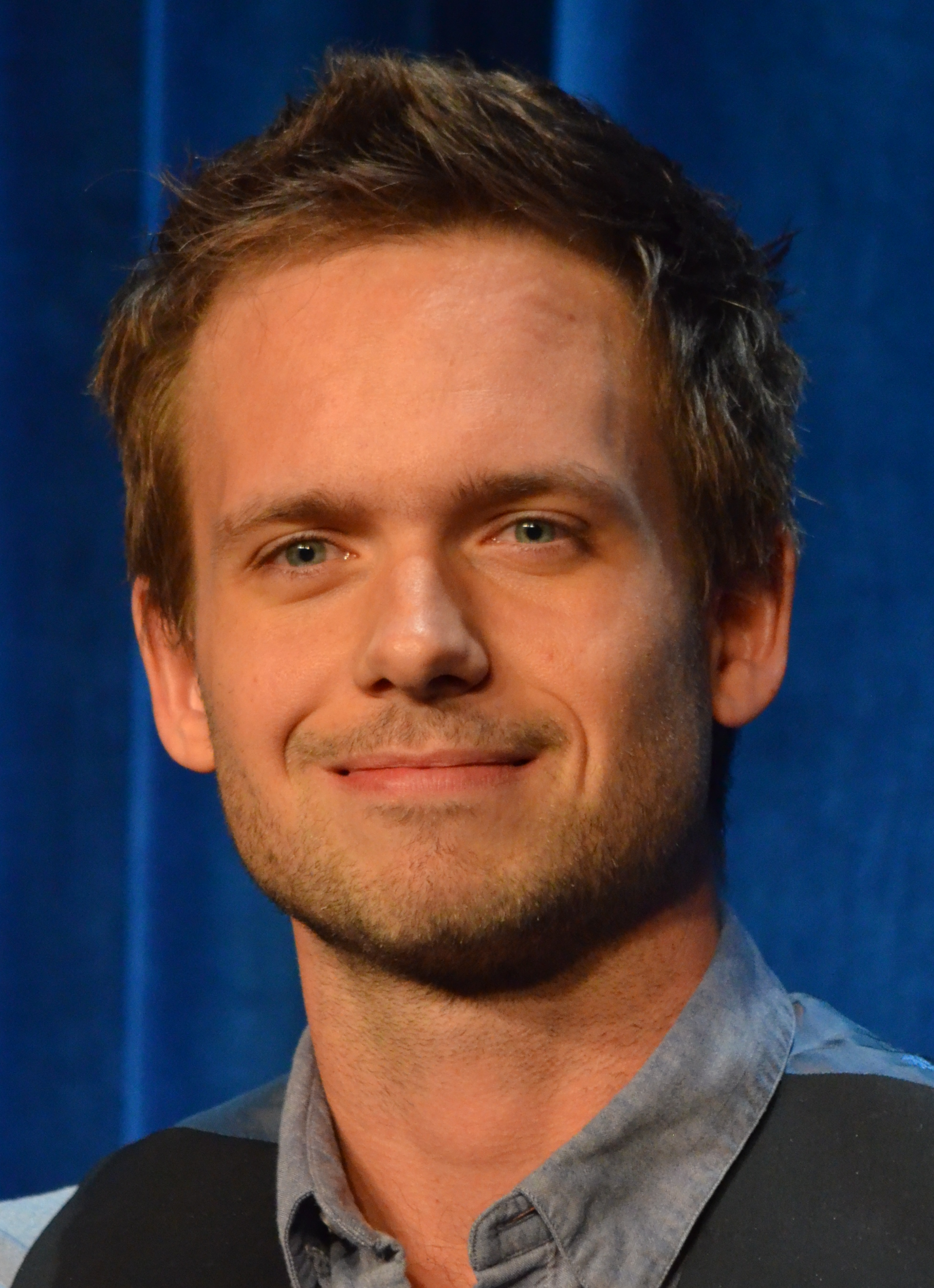
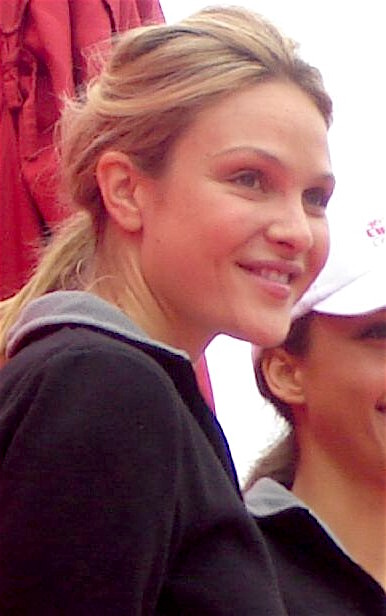
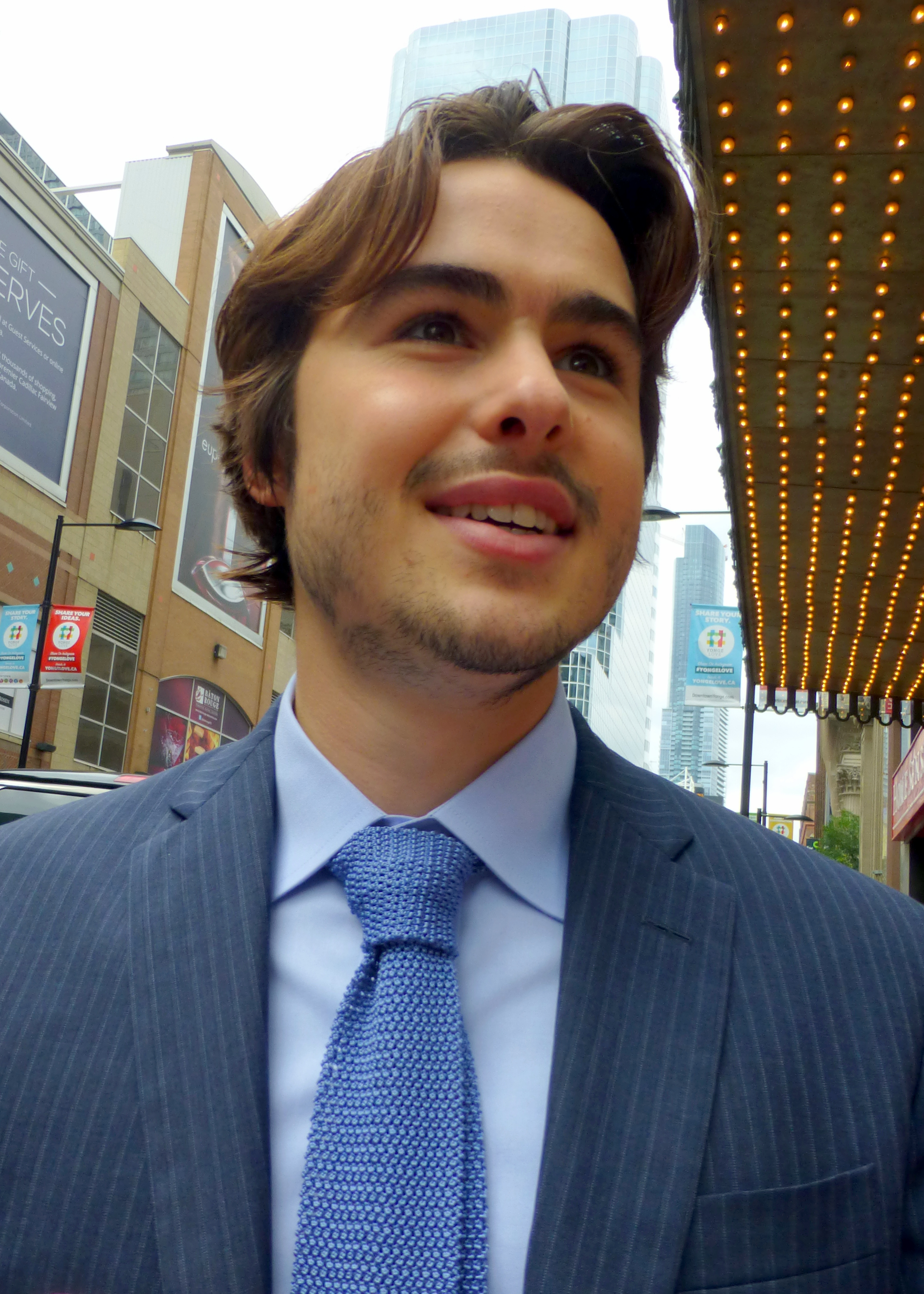
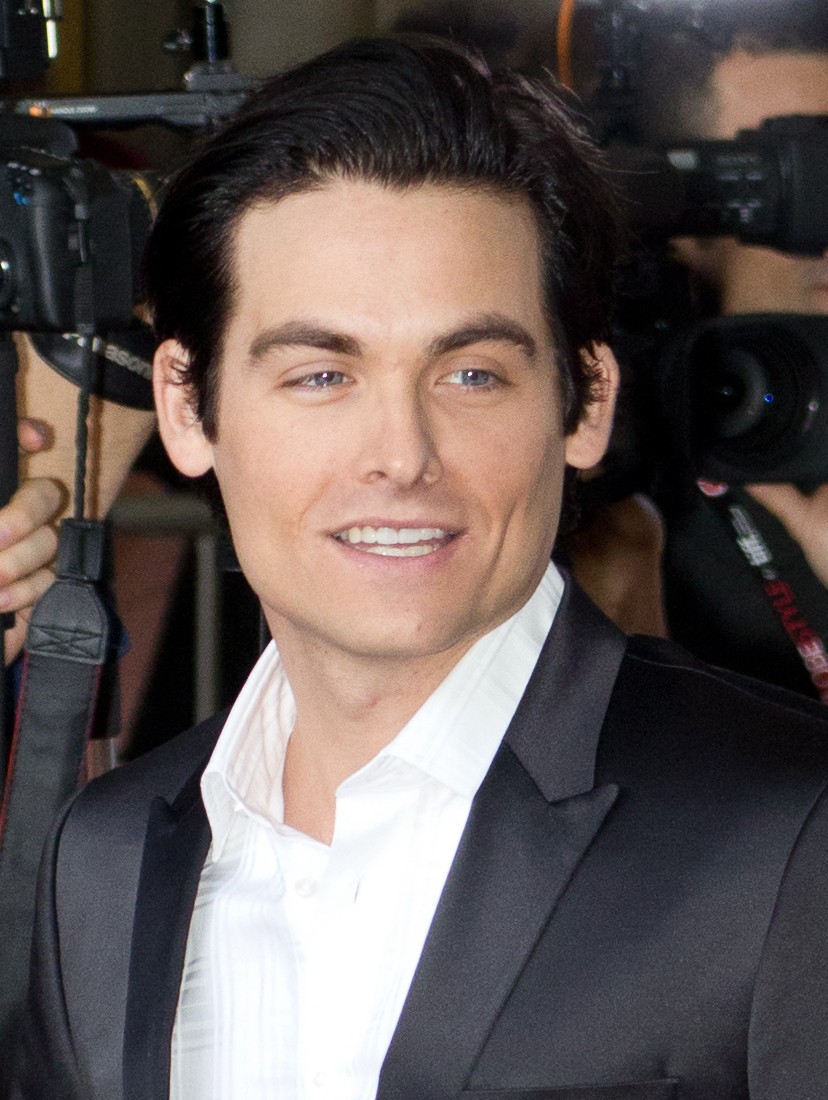
The series stars Michelle Pfeiffer, Kurt Russell, Matthew Fox, Patrick J. Adams, Beau Garrett, Ben Schnetzer, and Kevin Zegers (pictured left to right, top to bottom).

Hauser and Reilly also petitioned to be first-billed among the cast, which was seen as unlikely with the potential of McConaughey and Pfeiffer starring. The two were under pay-or-play filming guarantees from existing contracts for the cancelled sixth season of Yellowstone. Paramount and 101 Studios pitched using the allocated funds from that to cover the raises, but the performers declined holding the opinion that they were already entitled to that money.

Although the two were not negotiating together and could have signed-on independently of each other, representatives for the two remained in contact. In order for them to star, they would have needed to agree to Paramount's and 101 Studios' terms by February 10, 2024. Grimes was reportedly less concerned with receiving a substantial raise. A deal with McConaughey was not reached, and instead, Pfeiffer was the first cast member to be announced in August. Ultimately, no returning characters appeared; however, Grimes, Hauser, and Reilly would go on to star in their own sequels: Grimes in Marshals, a police procedural on CBS, and Hauser and Reilly in Dutton Ranch, a neo-Western on Paramount+. Both programs also featured other former Yellowstone cast members.

Elle Chapman, Adams, Beau Garrett, Amiah Miller, and Matthew Fox were announced as cast members later in August, followed by Ben Schnetzer in October, and Kevin Zegers, Rebecca Spence, Alaina Pollack, and Danielle Vasinova in December. Russell officially joined The Madison as a series regular in September 2025. His delay in joining the show was caused by scheduling conflicts with the Apple TV series Monarch: Legacy of Monsters and resulted in him almost turning the offer down. Russell was filming the second season of that program during the same time that production on the first season of The Madison was occurring. Determined to get him to star, Sheridan and Pfeiffer devised a plan that allowed him to appear in both by approaching Paramount+ executives and requesting the early renewal. The teaser trailer revealed that Will Arnett was also part of the cast and would be featured in a recurring role.

=== Filming ===
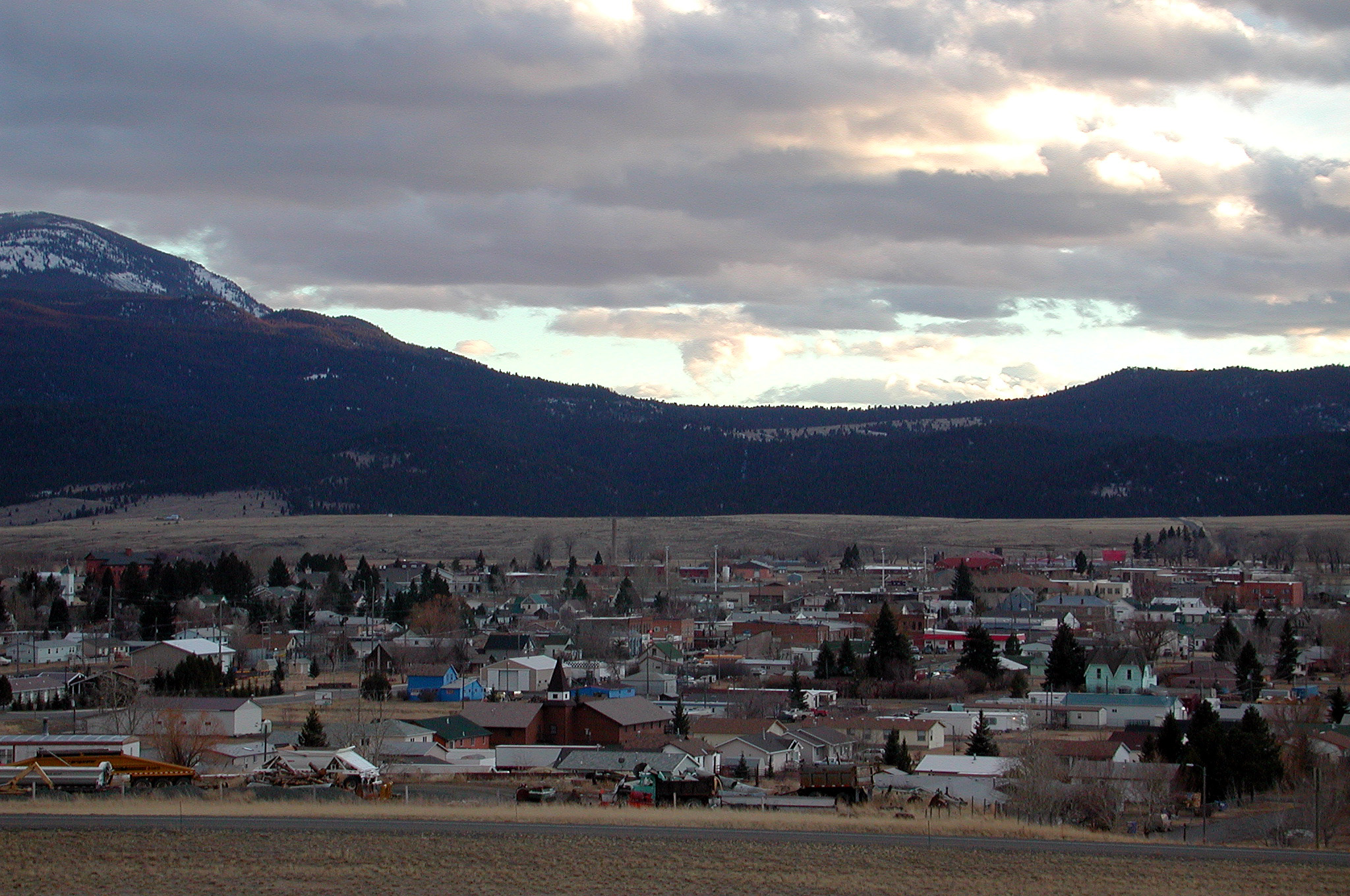
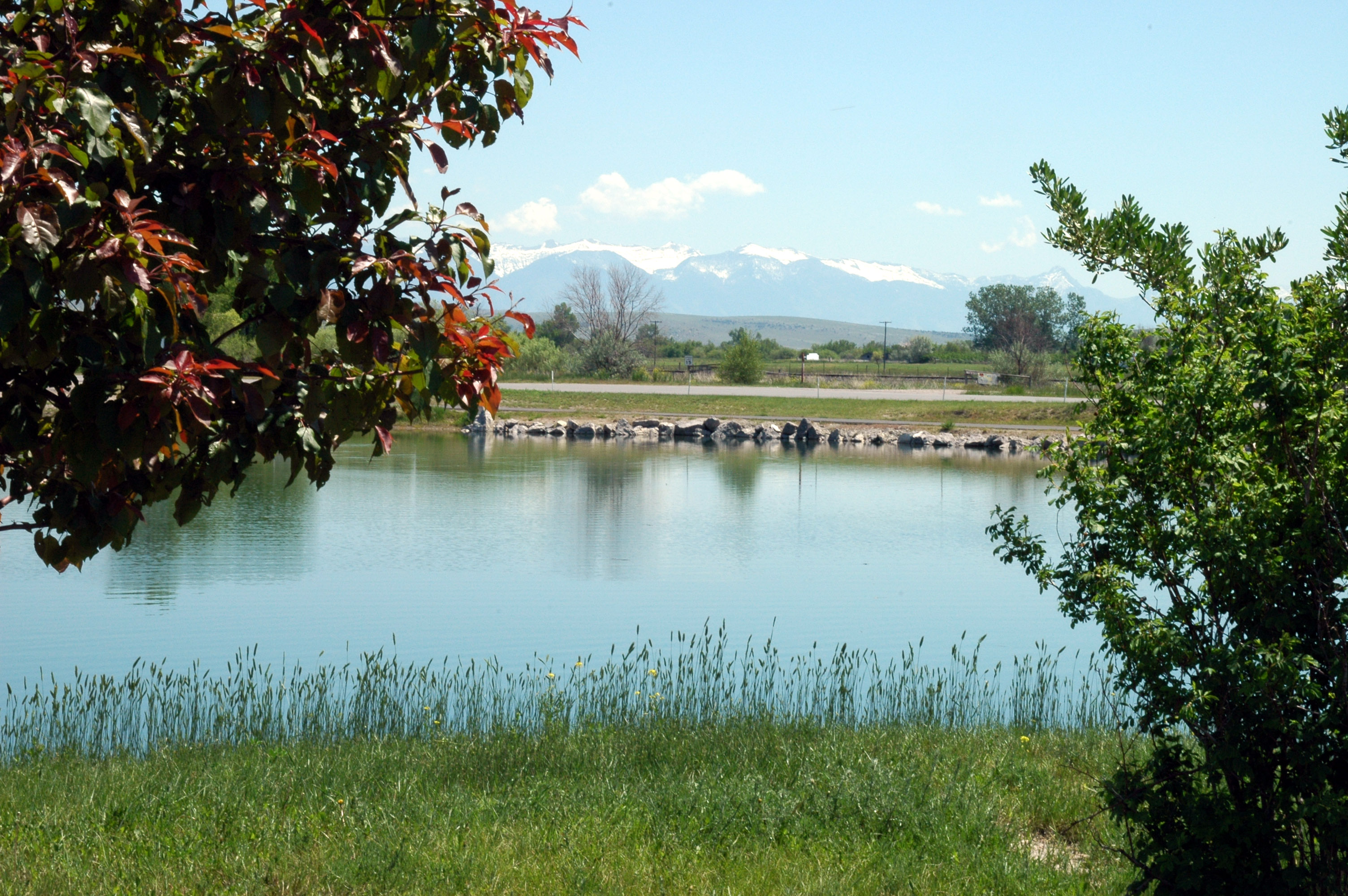
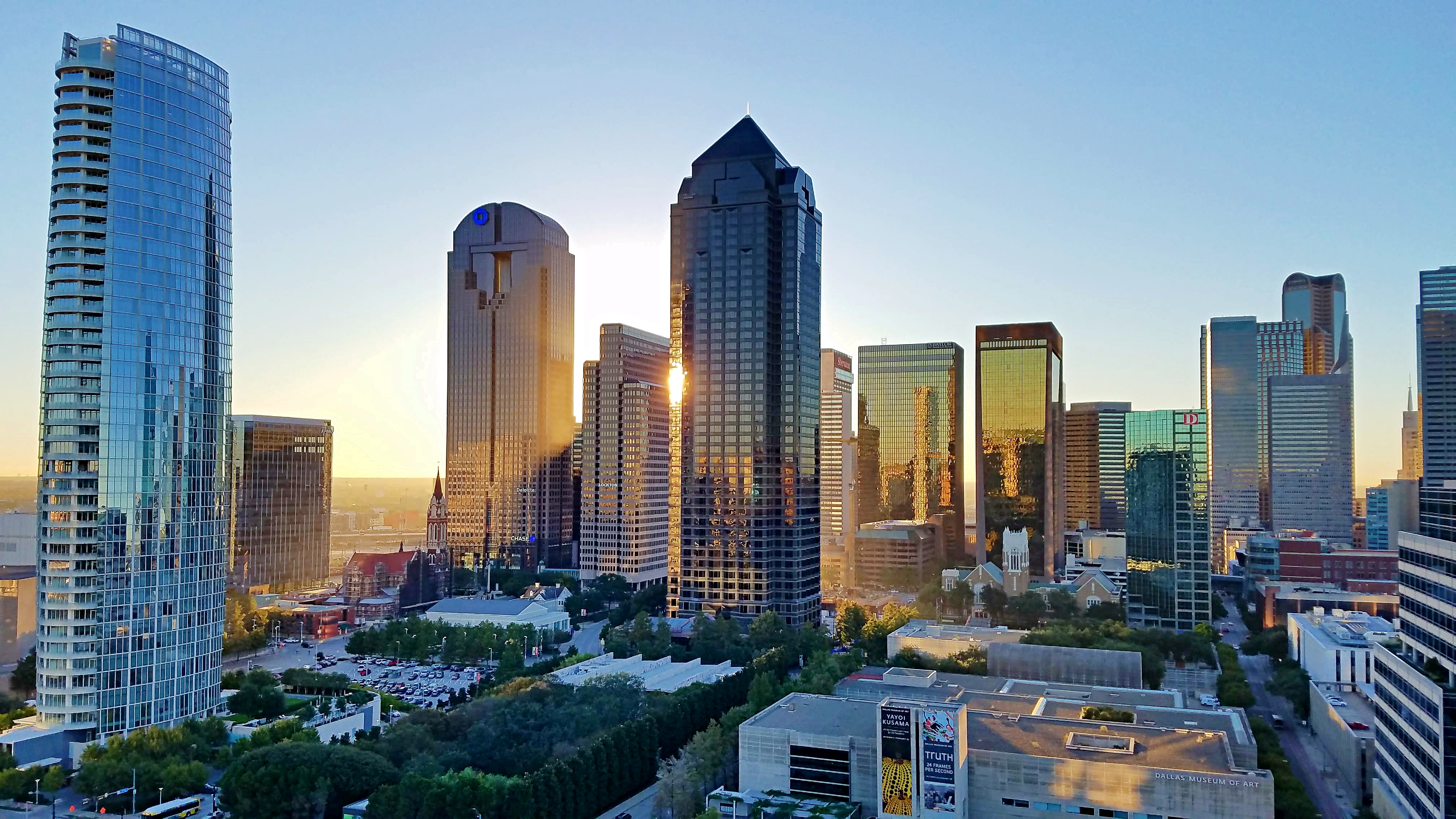
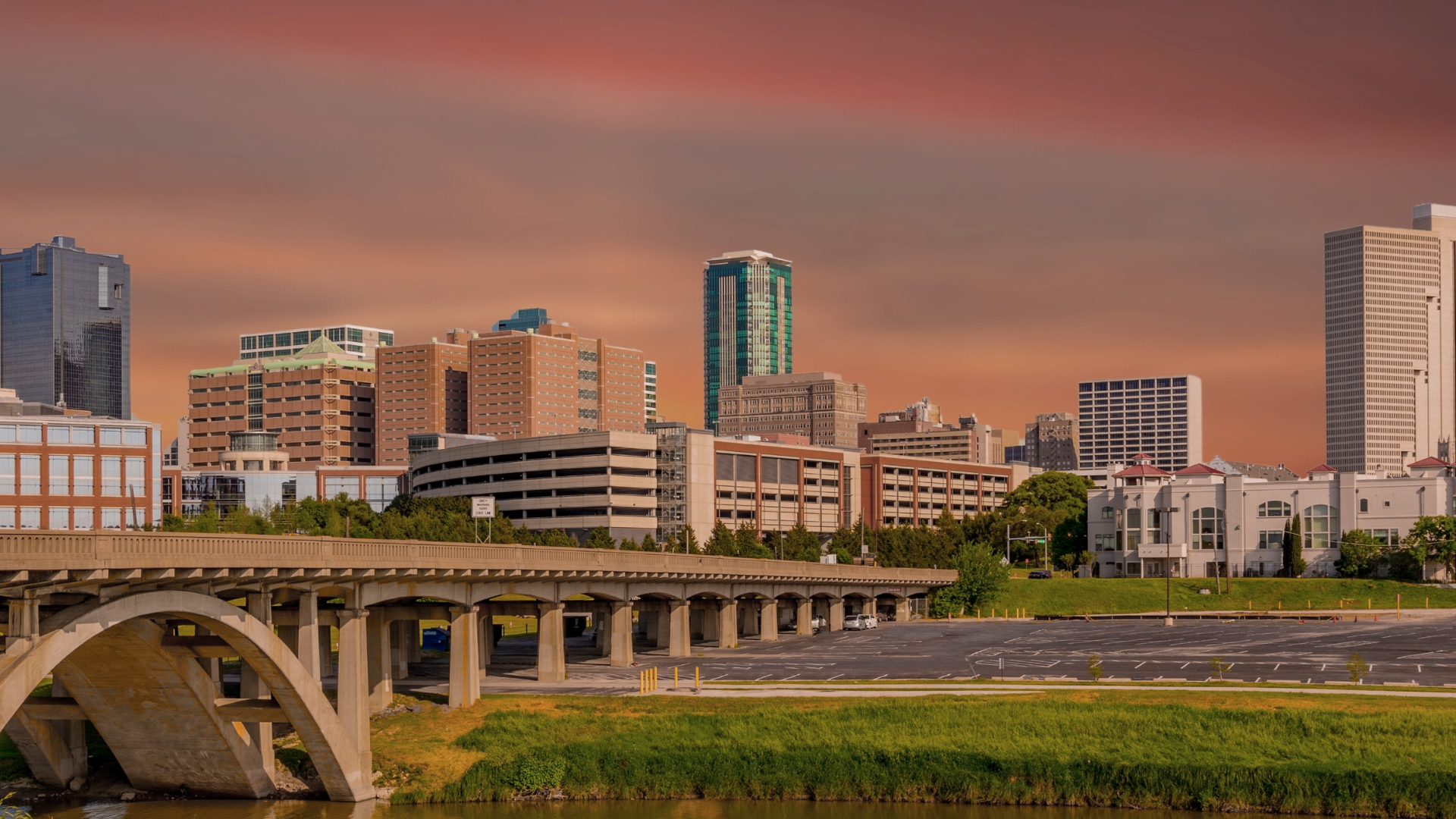
Filming for the first two seasons took place in multiple locations, including Boulder and Three Forks, Montana, and Dallas and Fort Worth, Texas.

Principal photography for the first season began in August 2024, with recording set to take place in Montana, New York, and Texas. Over six weeks was spent shooting in Three Forks, Montana before moving to Boulder in early November. Some recording also took place in Bozeman. Crews then moved to Dallas and Fort Worth, Texas later in the month, with Downtown Fort Worth eventually standing-in for the New York City-set scenes. Filming there continued into December before wrapping that year.

The second season followed a similar filming schedule in 2025. To accommodate Russell's availability all of his scenes in the first season were shot alongside season two. This caused Fox to shoot his scenes in a similar fashion because they all featured Russell. Recording started in September in Montana and shifted to Dallas, Denton, and Fort Worth in December. In Texas, the second season held soundstages at new studios co-owned by Sheridan and Glasser in Alliance. Shooting then wrapped shortly before Christmas. Voros, who previously worked on Yellowstone, directed all twelve episodes.

=== Music ===
The Madison (Original Television Soundtrack) Season 1

Soundtrack album by Breton Vivian
- Released: March 20, 2026
- Length: 45:38
- Label: Milan Records
- Producer: Breton Vivian

Breton Vivian chronology
Marshals (Original Television Soundtrack) Season 1 (2026)	The Madison (Original Television Soundtrack) Season 1 (2026)

Breton Vivian composed the score for the series. A soundtrack album was released on March 20, 2026.

All music is composed by Breton Vivian.

No.	Title	Length
1.	"The Madison"	1:10
2.	"Morning Fishing"	1:30
3.	"Virgin Water"	2:39
4.	"Bumpy Over the Mountains"	4:03
5.	"Take Me to the Coroner"	2:06
6.	"Preston's Cabin"	2:30
7.	"Itty Bitty Farm"	1:54
8.	"Hornets"	2:25
9.	"Stacy's Valley"	1:42
10.	"Strong Enough for This"	3:19
11.	"Preston's Favorite Place"	1:35
12.	"City Mice"	1:25
13.	"Excuse the Mess"	1:33
14.	"Get on a Plane"	1:17
15.	"Fishing by Moonlight"	2:35
16.	"I Own Land"	0:58
17.	"His Last Thought"	1:50
18.	"September"	1:46
19.	"Barrel Racing Lesson"	1:20
20.	"Preston's Farewell"	2:56
21.	"Good to See You Too"	2:23
22.	"Preston's Theme"	2:30
Total length:		45:38

== Release ==
After the series was ordered, it was set to first premiere on Paramount Network in December 2023, shortly after Yellowstone concluded its then-expected run. It was also announced the series would stream on Paramount+, described as a crucial point since Yellowstone's streaming rights are held by Peacock. Its debut was delayed to the following year amid the 2023 Writers Guild of America and SAG-AFTRA strikes, and again once more to 2025. The series later shifted its initial release platform to Paramount+; the executives there opted to explore an unconventional schedule for the program, in which the six-episode first season was split into two halves and made available in just two weeks. The first set of three episodes was ultimately released on March 14, while the second set was released on March 21, 2026. In Europe, the series premiered on March 27 on SkyShowtime.

== Reception ==
On the review aggregator website Rotten Tomatoes, 63% of 51 critics' reviews are positive, with an average rating of 6.3/10. The website's consensus reads: "The Madison may not be an all-inclusive stay, but it offers a top-tier Michelle Pfeiffer, beautiful East Coast locations, and an expansion of the Taylor Sheridan universe, which is satisfying enough." Metacritic, which uses a weighted average, assigned the series a score of 57 out of 100, based on 22 critics, indicating "mixed or average" reviews.

Sarah Dempster writing for The Guardian called the show "thuddingly simplistic" and wrote "As we suffer yet another aerial shot of the Clyburns clomping Hobbit-like through swaying fields of gold, the penny drops: Montana is The Shire. NYC, of course, is Mordor."

The show's first season was a ratings success, becoming the biggest television debut of Taylor Sheridan's career. In its first 10 days on Paramount+, the series drew 8 million streaming views globally.
