= Selina Hall =

British engraver and printer

Selina Hall (1780?–1853) was a British engraver and printer in London who prepared maps for several well-known works including John Gorton's A Topographical Dictionary, Charles Black's 1840 General Atlas and several Chapman & Hall publications.

Born Selina Price in Radnorshire around 1780, she was listed as a creditor and beneficiary of London mapmaker and engraver Michael Thomson. In 1821, she married Thomson's business partner Sidney Hall. Hall took over the business from her husband upon his death in 1831. At that time and place it was illegal for married women to own businesses, however, unmarried women (including widows) could own businesses. Maps engraved by Sidney Hall were signed "Engraved by Sid^{y}. Hall" while Selina marked her maps as "Engraved by S. Hall." The similarity in their signatures caused extensive misattribution of her works to her deceased husband.

From 1831 until her death, she operated at 18 Bury Street in the Bloomsbury District of London.

Hall died in 1853 around the age of 73. The business was carried on by her nephew Edward Weller.
