= Score (Paul Haslinger album) =

Studio album by Paul Haslinger
- Released: January 26, 1999
- Genre: Electronic
- Length: 57:21
- Label: RGB/Hearts of Space Records
- Producer: Paul Haslinger, Brian Williams

Paul Haslinger chronology
Planetary Traveler (1998)	Score (1999)	Underworld (2003)

Professional ratings
Review scores
Source	Rating
Allmusic	4/5 stars

Score is the fourth album by Paul Haslinger, which was released on January 26, 1999, on RGB Records.

== Track listing ==
All music is composed by Paul Haslinger

No.	Title	Length
1.	"Accidental Measures in Cool"	4:57
2.	"The Infinite Jest"	3:51
3.	"When Worlds Collide"	4:56
4.	"The Real Question (Is...)"	3:48
5.	"Fantastic Voyage"	7:38
6.	"Magheda"	5:27
7.	"Inbetween Nowhere"	3:07
8.	"Life, Lounge and Lesser Evils"	5:30
9.	"This Station"	3:59
10.	"Hardboiled Wonderland"	4:25
11.	"War in the Heart of Eden"	6:00
12.	"New India"	3:51

== Personnel ==
Musicians

- Charlie Campagna – vocals
- Karl "Bumi" Fian – trumpet
- Paul Haslinger – instruments, production, engineering, mixing, cover art
- S'Ange – vocals
- Maria Schlieber – violin
- Brian Williams – guitar, producer

Production and additional personnel

- Stephen Hill – mastering, art direction
- Bob Olhsson – mastering
- Rex Ray – design
- Mitch Zelezny – mixing
