= Cantus Umbrarum =

Studio album by Lightwave
- Released: 2000
- Genre: Dark ambient
- Length: 67:57
- Label: Horizon
- Producer: Lightwave

Lightwave chronology
Mundus Subterraneus (1995)	Cantus Umbrarum (2000)	Caryotype (2001)

Professional ratings
Review scores
Source	Rating
Allmusic	4.5/5 stars

Cantus Umbrarum is the fourth studio album by Lightwave, released in 2000 by Horizon Music.

== Track listing ==
All music is composed by Christoph Harbonnier and Christian Wittman.

No.	Title	Length
1.	"The Door"	0:35
2.	"The Mirror of Shades"	10:29
3.	"A Mineral Light in the Subterranean Sky"	5:48
4.	"Into the Labyrinth"	1:04
5.	"Such a Delicate Music in the Woods"	2:42
6.	"Down Down Down"	4:27
7.	"To the Deep"	8:42
8.	"Waterfalls"	1:41
9.	"The Deep Music of a Rolling World"	3:48
10.	"Drops & Life"	1:21
11.	"Silent Souls"	3:34
12.	"Geological Memories"	2:14
13.	"Farewell to Darkness"	3:14
14.	"Erebus"	8:13
15.	"Elysian Fields"	10:05

== Personnel ==
Adapted from the Cantus Umbrarum liner notes.

Lightwave

- Christoph Harbonnier – electronics, recording, mixing, illustrations
- Christian Wittman – electronics, voice, art direction\

Additional musicians

- Jacques Derégnaucourt – electronics, violin, viola
- John Greaves – voice
- Marie-Christine Letort – voice
- Renaud Pion – bass clarinet, Turkish clarinet, flute, electronics
- Jean-Luc Revol – voice
- Eric Theobald – voice

Production

- Michel Geiss – mastering
- Lightwave – production

== Release history ==
Region	Date	Label	Format	Catalog
United States	2000	Horizon Music	CD	HM-1006
