= Mike Gunther =

American stuntman and film director

- Born: United States
- Occupations: Director; Stuntman
- Years active: 2002-present
- Notable work: Transformers: Age of Extinction; Star Trek Beyond; Teenage Mutant Ninja Turtles: Out of the Shadows; Transformers: Age of Extinction

Mike Gunther is an American film director and stuntman. He is known for being the second unit director on many movies like Transformers: The Last Knight (2017), Star Trek Beyond (2016), Teenage Mutant Ninja Turtles: Out of the Shadows (2016), Transformers: Age of Extinction (2014), and Bad Boys For Life (2020) Gunther also owns and operates 5150Action Productions, a film production company focusing on a wide slate of original content development.

== Career ==
After a career as a stunt performer and coordinator creating action sequences for films as well as serving as second unit director on Steve Oedekerk's Kung Pow! Enter the Fist in 2002, Gunther developed and sold a slate of MTV shows, including Live Free or Die Hard: Inside the Action (2007), Ghost Rider: Inside the Action (2007), Your Movie Show (2005–2006), and Underworld: Evolution – Inside the Action (2005) before directing the theatrical feature films Beatdown (2010) starring Danny Trejo and Rudy Youngblood and Setup starring Bruce Willis, Ryan Phillippe, and 50 Cent

In 2014, he returned to second unit directing for movies, starting Transformers: Age of Extinction (2014) and continuing with Sabotage (2014), The Purge: Anarchy (2014), Teenage Mutant Ninja Turtles: Out of the Shadows (2016), Star Trek Beyond (2016), Transformers: The Last Knight (2017), and Bumblebee (2018) as well as becoming a voting member of the Academy of Motion Picture Arts and Sciences by invitation in 2018.

In 2019, Gunther directed and produced the Rogue Warfare trilogy for Netflix.

Gunther was later second unit director and supervising stunt coordinator on Bad Boys For Life in 2020, Shang-Chi and the Legend of the Ten Rings and The Forever Purge in 2021, The Lost City, Me Time, and Ambulance in 2022, Ghostbusters: Frozen Empire, Twisters, and Beverly Hills Cop: Axel F in 2024, and Focker-in-Law, set for release in November 2026.

== Filmography ==
As Second Unit Director

Year	Title	Director	Notes
2002	Kung Pow! Enter the Fist	Steve Oedekerk	Also stunt double: Steve Oedekerk
2009	Fast & Furious	Justin Lin	Mexico; uncredited
2009	Fighting	Dito Montiel	uncredited
2010	Zeke and Luther	Joe Menendez	Television series; Episode: Tall Stack Of Waffles
2014	Sabotage	David Ayer	
2014	Transformers: Age of Extinction	Michael Bay	
2014	The Purge: Anarchy	James DeMonaco	
2014-2018	Scorpion	Various	Television series
2015	Scouts Guide to the Zombie Apocalypse	Christopher Landon	
2016	Star Trek Beyond	Justin Lin	
2016	Teenage Mutant Ninja Turtles: Out of the Shadows	Dave Green	
2017	Transformers: The Last Knight	Michael Bay	
2018	Bumblebee	Travis Knight	
2018	Tom Clancy's Jack Ryan	Daniel Sackheim	Television series; Episode: Inshallah
2020	Bad Boys For Life	Adil El Arbi and Bilall Fallah	
2021	The Forever Purge	Everardo Valerio Gout	
2021	Shang-Chi and the Legend of the Ten Rings	Destin Daniel Cretton	
2022	The Lost City	Aaron and Adam Nee	
2022	Ambulance	Michael Bay	
2022	Me Time	John Hamburg	
2024	Ghostbusters: Frozen Empire	Gil Kenan	
2024	Beverly Hills Cop: Axel F	Mark Molloy	
2024	Twisters	Lee Isaac Chung	
2026	Focker-in-Law †	John Hamburg	Post-production

As Director / Writer / Producer

- Setup (2011) (Director, Writer)
- End of Watch (2012) (Associate Producer)
- Rogue Warfare (2019) (Director, Writer, Producer)
- Rogue Warfare: The Hunt (2019) (Director, Producer)
- Rogue Warfare: Death of a Nation (2020) (Director, Producer)
- A Violent Land (TBA) (Director, Writer, Producer)
- Stop Frank (TBA) (Director, Writer)
- Criminal (TBA) (Director, Writer)

== Awards ==
- 2010 World Stunt Awards – Won, Taurus Award – Best Stunt Coordinator and/or 2nd Unit Director: Feature Film for Fast & Furious
- 2012 World Stunt Awards – Won, Taurus Award – Best High Work for Fast Five
- 2012 World Stunt Awards – Won, Taurus Award – Best Stunt Coordinator and/or 2nd Unit Director: Feature for Fast Five
- 2012 World Stunt Awards – Won, Taurus Award – Best Fight for Fast Five
- 2020 World Stunt Awards – Nominated Taurus Award – Best Stunt Coordinator and/or 2nd Unit Director for Bad Boys for Life – Columbia Pictures Entertainment
- 2021 Indiana Film Journalists Association – Nominated, IFJA Award – Best Stunt/Movement Choreography for Ambulance – Universal Pictures
- 2025 World Stunt Awards – Won, Taurus Award – Best Specialty Stunt for Beverly Hills Cop: Axel F
