= Turistas =

- Theatrical release poster
- Directed by: John Stockwell
- Written by: Michael Arlen Ross
- Produced by: Marc Butan; Scott Steindorff; John Stockwell; Joe Zenga
- Starring: Josh Duhamel; Melissa George; Olivia Wilde; Desmond Askew; Beau Garrett; Max Brown; Agles Steib; Miguel Lunardi
- Cinematography: Enrique Chediak
- Edited by: Jeff McEvoy
- Music by: Paul Haslinger
- Production companies: 2929 Entertainment; Stone Village Productions; BoZ Productions
- Distributed by: Fox Atomic
- Release date: December 1, 2006
- Running time: 93 minutes
- Country: United States
- Languages: English; Portuguese
- Budget: $10 million
- Box office: $14.7 million

Turistas (/turiːstɔːs/; English: Tourists, released in the United Kingdom and Ireland as Paradise Lost) is a 2006 American horror film produced and directed by John Stockwell, written by Michael Arlen Ross, and starring Josh Duhamel, Melissa George, Olivia Wilde, Desmond Askew, Max Brown, and Beau Garrett. Its plot focuses on a group of international backpackers in Brazil who find themselves in the clutches of an underground organ trafficking ring.

It was the first American film to be exclusively shot in Brazil. It was also the first film distributed by Fox Atomic, a subsidiary of 20th Century Fox, which released it theatrically in the United States on December 1, 2006.

== Plot ==
Three young American tourists, Alex, his sister Bea, and her friend Amy, are backpacking in Brazil. After a bus crash leaves all the passengers stranded, they are joined by two British men, Finn and Liam, and an Australian woman, Pru, who is fluent in Portuguese.

The group find a cabana bar where several other tourists are partying. After spending the day on the beach, they are served drugged drinks and pass out. The next morning, they awaken on the deserted beach, robbed of their luggage, money and travel documents. Looking for help in a nearby village, Kiko, a young local who speaks some English, volunteers to take them to his uncle's isolated house in the forest where they can wait for a ride.

En route to the house, Kiko shows the group a cave beneath a waterfall, but while diving into the water, he sustains a serious head injury. At the house, they find food, clothes, and a number of prescription drugs, as well as a drawer filled with other people's passports. They manage to treat Kiko's wound and reluctantly decide to spend the night. They are awakened in the middle of the night by a helicopter bringing Zamora, a physician, and several associates and doctors, surrounded by armed henchmen. A woman who arrives advises them to flee but when the group try and fight them, they are beaten into submission. Kiko flees from the house.

A sedated Amy awakens tied to a makeshift operating room where Zamora begins to remove her organs, while he explains to Finn, who is also tied up, that organ theft for transplant from Brazilians by rich gringos is part of a pattern of exploitation of Brazilian "resources", and that it is time to "give back." Victims' usable organs are being harvested and sent to the People's Hospital in Rio de Janeiro and used for the benefit of the poor. Amy dies on the operating table, after all her organs are removed.

Meanwhile, the rest of the group outside manage to break free from cages they have been contained in, and fight and kill one of Zamora's associates, with the aid of Kiko, who has returned to help them. While Bea and Pru flee into the jungle, Alex, Kiko and Liam attempt to raid the cabin. They successfully rescue Finn, but he is shot in the head while escaping. Alex flees, while Liam decides to stay behind to fight back, only to be shot and captured for his organs to be salvaged.

Alex and Kiko find Bea hiding near the river. The three head to the flooded cave where they find Pru. Diving and swimming to the cavern's secondary entrance, they find Zamora is also there, and he shoots at them in the water, killing Kiko and injuring Alex's hand. Alex, Bea and Pru are forced to backtrack into the cave; they become split up while stopping in pockets of air to breathe. Bea and the archer meet at the same spot, but Bea takes an arrow from the man, stabbing him in the neck and killing him. They all manage to escape the cave only to run into Zamora at the exit. Alex attacks and repeatedly hits him in the head with a rock, but is interrupted by Jamoru, one of Zamora's henchman who is armed with a rifle.

Zamora instructs him to kill the trio but, seeing them vulnerable and scared, and Zamora in agony, Jamoru hesitates. Pru tries to convince Jamoru to spare them, pointing out Zamora's poor treatment of him. Zamora calls Jamoru a coward, and is then shot in the head by Jamoru, who turns and walks off. Soon after, the survivors, coming out of the jungle, meet local villagers who take them in.

Later, Alex, Bea, and Pru stand in line, waiting to board an airplane in silence while a couple of tourists behind them argue over going by bus. Alex turns and advises them to take the plane instead.

== Cast ==
- Josh Duhamel as Alex
- Melissa George as Pru
- Olivia Wilde as Bea
- Beau Garrett as Amy
- Agles Steib as Kiko
- Desmond Askew as Finn
- Max Brown as Liam
- Miguel Lunardi as Dr. Zamora
- Gustav Roth as Svend
- Olga Diegues as Annika
- Lucy Ramos as Arolea
- Andréa Leal as Camila
- Jorge Só as bus driver
- Cristiani Aparecida as Native beauty
- Julia Dykstra as Zamora's Assistant
- Diego Santiago as Jacaré
- Marcão as Ranan
- Miguelito Acosta as Jamoru

== Production ==
=== Development ===
The screenplay for Turistas was written by Michael Arlen Ross. John Stockwell, who had previously directed Blue Crush (2002) and Into the Blue (2005), was inspired to direct the film upon reading the screenplay after returning from Peru: "I had been robbed by a group of 13-year-old, glue-sniffing kids and gotten shot at. I went to the cops, and they basically told us, 'If you give us $300, we'll let you kill these kids.' And I thought, if that kind of [stuff] is possible.... I came home and read the script and it resonated." On the violence depicted in the screenplay, Stockwell added: "I wasn't really getting into a race to see who can make people squirm. I was just really interested in taking people into a world and situation that they could, maybe, see themselves also being in and wondering how they would react. It also, honestly, just taps into America's fears of traveling abroad. How we're perceived outside of our borders today."

=== Casting ===
Olivia Wilde was cast in the role of Bea after auditioning, while Beau Garrett was offered an audition by Stockwell, with whom she had worked in the past.

=== Filming ===
Filming took place in the Chapada Diamantina, a region of Bahia state, and in the Litoral Norte, the easternmost coastal part of the São Paulo state. Turistas was the first American film to be shot exclusively on location in Brazil. The shoot was described as "low-key," with many locals hired as extras and to work behind-the-scenes. The underwater sequences in the cave system were filmed largely without stunt people, and according to Stockwell, one shot required Josh Duhamel to swim 100 yards (91 m) to escape through a hole. Olivia Wilde recalled losing consciousness while filming in the caves after using oxygen in an air pocket too quickly: "I start flailing around, having forgotten the emergency signal. But, of course, my character is supposed to be flailing, so every time I look frightened, they're like, 'Great, Olivia, great!'"

Stockwell shot the film without hair and makeup artists present, and without trailers for the actors. Melissa George described the filming experience as being completely free of "comforts": "We had no trailers, no shoes on, no clothing, no makeup artists. He [Stockwell] strips away everything to the point that it's like [shooting] a Dogme film." For her evisceration sequence in the film, actress Beau Garrett had to have a body cast made, which took seven hours to construct; the scene itself took a further twelve hours to film, during which Garrett remained on the operating table, unable to move. "I peed in a bed pan, and I ate food in a torso," she stated. "It was super strange."

== Release ==
In June 2006, it was reported that 20th Century Fox's then-new subsidiary genre label, Fox Atomic, had purchased Turistas for North American distribution. It was the first film to be released by the company. It was released theatrically in the United States on December 1, 2006. In the United Kingdom and Ireland, the film was released under the title Paradise Lost.

=== Home media ===
In the United States, Turistas was released on DVD March 29, 2007, featuring both the rated theatrical and unrated versions.

== Reception ==
=== Box office ===
The film opened at the U.S. box office at number eight on December 1, 2006, earning $3.5 million during its opening weekend on 1,570 screens. It earned an additional $1.9 million the following week, showing on 1,572 screens. However, by December 15, the film's number of screening theaters had reduced to 375. It would remain in U.S. theaters for a total of eight weeks before finishing its theatrical run on January 25, 2007. The film had a total domestic gross of $7,027,762, earning an additional $7,663,225 in foreign markets, making for a worldwide total gross of $14,690,987.

=== Critical response ===
Turistas holds a 19% approval rating on Rotten Tomatoes, based on 105 critic reviews with an average score of 3.85/10. The consensus reads, "Beautiful scenery and cinematography can't save Turistas from its wooden acting and stale and predictable plot."

Writing for The New York Times, Manohla Dargis reported that the film was "plain stupid," adding: "Apologists for vivisectionist entertainment trot out all sorts of rationales to justify the spectacle of human torture instead of just admitting that such spectacles turn them on. In this respect the horror audience, in its enthusiasm for go-go gore, is far more honest than those who hide behind the fig leaf of radical politics." Desson Thomson of The Washington Post wrote of the film: "On the one hand, it's an oglefest of young things on the beach, as they preen, chug and splash in azure waters; on the other, it's a slice-a-rama that turns those nubile bodies into crimson sushi. The one agenda opposes–rather than complements–the other."

Dennis Lim of the Los Angeles Times wrote: "Turistas seeks to exploit the current craze for torture-porn, but it lacks the relentless sadism of the Saw franchise. More than half the movie is dull buildup, as the lambs (clueless gringo tourists, thrown together after a bus accident) are herded slowly to the slaughter," but added: "Every now and again, [the film] connects with the harsh reality of the real world–one in which, thanks to the ongoing war in Iraq, Americans are increasingly viewed as imperialist aggressors." The Village Voice's Nathan Lee wrote: "Given the dullness of the protagonists and the heavy dose of anesthetic administered during the operations, that's not an entirely unsympathetic cause, and though Turistas eventually bogs down in an underlit mess, it more or less scratches the neo-exploitation itch. Bonus point for best tagline of the year: "Go Home.""

Michael Gingold of Fangoria called the film "a better and scarier film than Hostel" and compared it to survival thriller films, adding: "it'll have you thinking that a nice safe movie theater is a better place to be this winter than a tropical "paradise."" Owen Gleiberman of Entertainment Weekly awarded the film a "C−" rating, referring to it as "Hostel without sadistic thrills." Steve Barton of Dread Central wrote: "Turistas may not be the dud we all expected (which will no doubt earn it a heap of praise), but it's a wholly unremarkable movie. If you're looking for a cheap ninety minutes of routine suspense, this may very well be your cup of tea. If you're looking for something more, take the poster's advice and go home."

=== Protests ===
The film was boycotted by some citizens in Brazil because of the perceived negative image it portrayed of the country, and American actor Duhamel apologized to the Brazilian government and to the Brazilian people during an appearance on The Tonight Show with Jay Leno. He said that it was not the intention of the film to stop tourists from visiting Brazil. Actress Beau Garrett also commented on the controversy, saying: "This film isn't about scaring people away from traveling, or seeing places like Brazil. Brazil is an incredible country and embraced us; I never felt alien at all in that country... it's about being aware."

Embratur, the Brazilian government's agency of tourism, issued a statement grateful for the bad critical reception in North America. The agency stated they did not feel that Turistas would hurt Brazil's image as viewers would differentiate reality from fiction. After its theatrical release, director Stockwell commented in an interview: "I feel a little badly that the Brazilians, mostly who haven't seen the movie, maybe they've seen the trailer, have been very upset about what they perceive the film's depiction of Brazil to be. I'm like, did you guys see City of God? That wasn't the most flattering of portrayals. I think they get very defensive when an American production company comes in and makes anything other than a Chamber of Commerce portrayal of the country."
