= Before I Self Destruct (film) =

2009 film directed by 50 Cent

- Directed by: Curtis Jackson
- Written by: Curtis Jackson
- Produced by: Curtis Jackson (also executive producer); J. Jesses Smith; Ken Kushner; Frank Mosca (associate producer)
- Starring: Curtis Jackson; Clifton Powell; Elijah Williams; Gabriel Ellis; Sasha Delvalle
- Edited by: Stephen Franciosa Jr; Ned Silhavy; Jimmy Higgins (co-editor); Vilan Trub (post-production supervisor)
- Music by: Curtis Jackson; Ky Miller; Victor Bruno; Stephen Tubin
- Production company: Kreative Film Empire
- Distributed by: Cheetah Vision
- Release date: November 23, 2009
- Running time: 79 Minutes
- Country: United States
- Language: English

Before I Self Destruct is a 2009 American direct-to-video crime drama film starring Curtis "50 Cent" Jackson, who also served as writer, director, producer and executive producer, that is included with his fourth studio album of the same name. It was released on November 23, 2009, two weeks after the release of the album.

== Plot ==
Clarence Jenkins (Curtis "50 Cent" Jackson), who lives with his mother Donna (Kar) and his gifted brother Shocka (Elijah "Strong-E" Williams), works in a supermarket after having his dreams of playing basketball professionally destroyed due to a knee injury. He longs for pretty girls he feels are beyond his reach, including a woman named Princess (Sasha Delvalle).

After Donna is accidentally shot and killed by a gunman named Tiny (Shorty Red) in a drive-by shooting, Clarence is unsure how to prevent Shocka, who has already been accepted to all eight Ivy League universities, from going into foster care. After being fired from his job and finding an eviction notice at his door, Clarence finds Tiny and kills him with a revolver that he finds beneath the bed at his hotel room. He then visits Sean (Clifton Powell), who is the local crime boss, to inform him that he killed Tiny, who had previously worked for Sean. Sean likes Clarence's style and he hires him to be his new hitman.

After obtaining financial success from his newly found criminal lifestyle and becoming able to provide to his brother, Clarence runs into Princess, the beautiful woman from the supermarket. He begins to develop a close bond with Princess but fails to realize that she is using him. Clarence bestows gold, diamonds and payback when Princess's ex-boyfriend Rafael (Gabriel Ellis) gets released from prison.

Rafael tracks Princess down by calling her from her mother's phone while she is in bed with Clarence. When Rafael demands the money he gave her for safekeeping, she meets up with him for sex but when he persists in his demands, the only word Princess says is "Clarence", implying that she gave Clarence Rafael's money. In order to take back his money, Rafael has her call Clarence and ask him to come to her mother's house to help move furniture. Princess and Rafael wait in his car across the street from her mother's house. As soon as Clarence steps out of the car, Rafael fatally shoots him.

When Princess arrives and steals all of Clarence's money from the drawer, Shocka realizes what is going on and vows revenge on her for getting his brother killed.

== Cast ==
- Curtis "50 Cent" Jackson as Clarence Jenkins, Shocka's elder brother and the main protagonist in the film
- Clifton Powell as Sean, Clarence's local crime boss
- Elijah "Strong E" Williams as Shocka, Clarence's 13-year-old brother
- Gabriel Ellis as Rafael, Princess's ex-boyfriend
- Sasha Delvalle as Princess
- Shorty Red as Tiny, a gunman who shot Clarence's mother
- Angel as Mona
- Anthony 'Treach' Criss as Cedrick
- Michael Wright as the first victim who got killed in a lift
- Lloyd Banks as Shocka's school teacher
- Gabrielle Casseus as Freddie
- Kar as Donna Jenkins, Clarence and Shocka's mother
- Jaquan K.R. Cobb as Bobby, Shocka's best friend at school
- Taquan K.R. Cobb as Kevin
- Eve Lora as Mrs. Ortiz, Princess's mother
- Joanne Read, Princess's Friend

== Music ==
The music for the film is composed by G-Unit frontman 50 Cent and Ky Miller (who both also served as music supervisors; Miller also served as ADR recordist and record producer) along with Victor Bruno (who also served as an ADR recordist; he also did the audio mix and design, and the sound design with Tom Gambale) and Stephen Tubin who composed and arranged the score. The first hit single "Ok, You're Right" from 50 Cent's fourth studio album of the same name was contributed to, and played in, Before I Self Destruct. The first single from the album was produced by Dr. Dre (who also served as 50 Cent's executive producer for the album).

Tony Yayo, another member from G-Unit, contributed his solo rap song "Face Off" (produced by Dream Team) in the film. Other contributed songs in the film include the following Ky Miller-produced tracks: "Come With Me" by Mass Hysteria, "It's Going Down" by Mike Knox, "Tell Me" by American female R&B singer Taryn Fouche, "All Night" by American rapper Smitty, and "Pray for Me" by R&B singer Gasner Hughes.

Prodigy contributed the song "Murder Murder" for the film, which produced by The Alchemist. 50 Cent also contributed three more rap songs in the film, such as the non-album single "Get Up" (produced by Scott Storch), which was replaced by the album's second single "Baby by Me" for the album of the same name, "Try Me" and "Cold Blooded" (both produced by Ky Miller).

== See also ==
- List of hood films
