= Paul Haslinger =

Austrian musician and composer

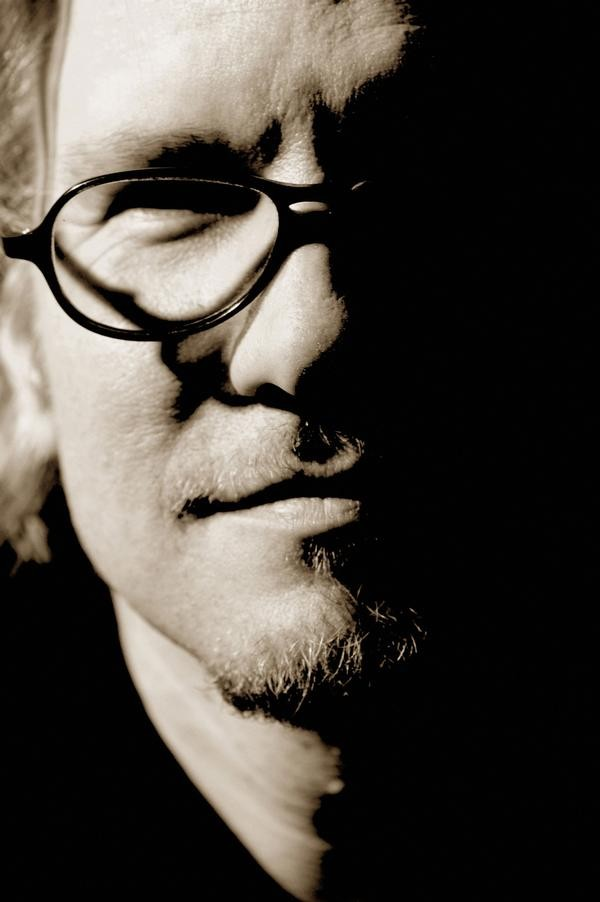
- Haslinger in 2007

Background information
- Born: Linz, Upper Austria, Austria
- Genres: Film score; video game score; electronic; ambient
- Occupations: Composer; music producer
- Instruments: Piano; keyboards; synthesizer; guitar
- Website: haslinger.com

Paul Haslinger is an Austrian musician and composer. He lives and works in Los Angeles, California.

== Life and career ==
=== Early life ===
Haslinger was born and raised in Linz, Austria. He attended high school at Kollegium Aloisianum, a Jesuit school near Linz. After graduating, he decided to pursue music professionally and studied at both the Vienna's Academy of Music and the University of Vienna. During this time he developed a career as a session player in Vienna and performed with local bands and artists.

=== Tangerine Dream (1986–1991) ===
In 1986, Haslinger joined the German electronic music group Tangerine Dream. During his 5 years with the group, he recorded a total of 15 albums, participated in 4 international tours, and collaborated on a number of soundtracks including Miracle Mile, Near Dark, Shy People and Miramar's Canyon Dreams directed by Jan Nickman. The soundtrack for Canyon Dreams earned Haslinger his first Grammy nomination in 1991.

=== Solo work in music ===
In 1991, Haslinger left Tangerine Dream and relocated to Los Angeles. At the time, he was signed to Private Music. While under contract, he worked on a joint project with Peter Baumann, called Blue Room (unreleased). In 1994 Haslinger released his first solo record, Future Primitive (Wildcat), followed by World Without Rules (1996, RGB) and Score (1999, RGB).

=== Collaborations ===
Through the 1990s, Haslinger collaborated on a number of projects with a variety of artists, among them: French Electronic band Lightwave, dark-ambient icon Brian Williams, aka Lustmord, singers Anna Homler & Nona Hendryx, as well as Jon Hassell. In 1998, Haslinger was asked to join the team around film composer Graeme Revell. He worked as a music programmer and arranger on films such as Chinese Box (1999), The Negotiator (1998), The Siege (1998), Pitch Black (2000), Blow (2001), and Lara Croft: Tomb Raider (2001). Haslinger has always favored a collaborative approach to film scoring, and has worked with many studio musicians and performers, such as Steve Tavaglione, George Doering, Greg Ellis, Diego Stocco, Charlie Campagna. In recent years he also started returning to some of his earlier work in experimental music, collaborating with Christian Fennesz and other artists related to British Avantgarde label Touch.

=== Music for film ===
Haslinger's first solo feature film credit came with Crazy/Beautiful, his second collaboration with director John Stockwell. They continued to work together on projects including Blue Crush, Into the Blue, Turistas, and In The Blood. Haslinger has provided scores to several indie and studio features including The Girl Next Door, Crank, Turistas, Shoot 'Em Up, Death Race, Takers, The Three Musketeers, and Mysteries of the Unseen World, among others.

In 2003, Haslinger scored his first film to open at number 1 at the U.S. box office, Underworld, directed by Len Wiseman. He returned to the popular franchise, scoring both Underworld: Rise of the Lycans and Underworld: Awakening. Haslinger's most popular track, "Eternity and a Day," has been used repeatedly throughout the franchise, and the score to Underworld: Awakening received a 2012 BMI Film Music Award. Haslinger composed the music for Resident Evil: The Final Chapter, directed by Paul W.S. Anderson and in theaters in 2017. A Resident Evil Soundtrack will be released in conjunction with the film.

In November 2009, Haslinger was hired to compose a new score for The Wolfman, replacing Danny Elfman. However, the studio reverted to Elfman's previously completed score a month before the film's release after finding Haslinger's electronic-based score unsuitable.

=== Music for television ===
Haslinger's first solo composer credit came in 2000 with the HBO Films television movie, Cheaters, which began his relationship with director John Stockwell. Taking a break from film scoring, he returned to television from 2005-2006 to score Showtime's Golden Globe-nominated series Sleeper Cell which resulted in Haslinger's first Primetime Emmy nomination for Outstanding Music Composition for a Miniseries, Movie, or a Special. In 2014, Haslinger was hired to score the AMC series Halt and Catch Fire. The show is set in the 1980s and has received much critical acclaim for its use of period-specific music. A Halt and Catch Fire soundtrack was released by Lakeshore Records in 2016. Expanding his work with AMC, in 2015 Haslinger was asked to write the music for AMC's spin-off series to The Walking Dead, entitled Fear the Walking Dead.

=== Music for video games ===
In 2005, Haslinger was approached by Ubisoft to score the video game Far Cry Instincts. Since then, he has scored a string of game releases, including Rainbow Six: Vegas, Wolverine, Need for Speed. Most recently he collaborated with Ben Frost on the score for the Rainbow Six: Siege, and it's further four years of support, co-scored with Jon Opstad, Will Bates.

== Works ==
=== Film ===
Year	Title	Director	Notes
1997	Planetary Traveler	Jan Nickman	Animated Short film
1999	Infinity's Child	Jan Nickman	Animated Short film
1999	The Story of Computer Graphics	Frank Foster	
2001	Picture Claire	Bruce McDonald	
2001	Crazy/Beautiful	John Stockwell	
2002	Blue Crush	John Stockwell	
2003	Underworld	Len Wiseman	
2004	Bring It On Again	Damon Santostefano	
2004	The Girl Next Door	Luke Greenfield	
2005	Into the Blue	John Stockwell	
2006	Crank	Mark Neveldine; Brian Taylor	
2006	Turistas	John Stockwell	
2007	Vacancy	Nimród Antal	
2007	Gardener of Eden	Kevin Connolly	
2007	Shoot 'Em Up	Michael Davis	
2008	The Fifth Commandment	Jesse V. Johnson	
2008	Prom Night	Nelson McCormick	
2008	Death Race	Paul W. S. Anderson	
2008	Make It Happen	Darren Grant	
2008	While She Was Out	Susan Montford	
2009	After.Life	Agnieszka Wojtowicz-Vosloo	
2009	Underworld: Rise of the Lycans	Patrick Tatopoulos	
2010	Takers	John Luessenhop	
2010	Death Race 2	Roel Reiné	
2011	The Three Musketeers	Paul W. S. Anderson	
2012	Underworld: Awakening	Måns Mårlind; Bjorn Stein	
2013	Mysteries of the Unseen World	Louis Schwartzberg	Released on IMAX
2014	In the Blood	John Stockwell	
2014	No Good Deed	Sam Miller	
2016	Resident Evil: The Final Chapter	Paul W. S. Anderson	
2018	Wildling	Fritz Böhm	
2018	The Perfection	Richard Shepard	
2020	Monster Hunter	Paul W. S. Anderson	
2025	In the Lost Lands	Paul W. S. Anderson	

=== Television ===
Year	Title	Notes
1994	Pointman	Television film
2000	Cheaters	Television film
2005–2006	Sleeper Cell	
2012	Seal Team Six: The Raid on Osama Bin Laden	Television film
2015–2017	Fear the Walking Dead	
2014–2017	Halt and Catch Fire	
2020	Paradise Lost	
2021	The Irregulars	

=== Video games ===
Year	Title
2005	Far Cry Instincts
2006	Far Cry Instincts: Evolution
2006	Tom Clancy's Rainbow Six: Vegas
2008	Tom Clancy's Rainbow Six: Vegas 2
2008	Need For Speed: Undercover
2009	X-Men Origins: Wolverine
2011	Tom Clancy's Rainbow Six: Shadow Vanguard
2015–2019	Tom Clancy's Rainbow Six Siege

=== Solo projects ===
Year	Title	Label
Coma Virus
1997	Hidden	Side Effects
Solo
1994	Future Primitive	Wildcat Recording Corporation
1996	World Without Rules	RGB
1999	Score	RGB/Hearts of Space Records
2020	Exit Ghost	Artificial Instinct
2021	Exit Ghost II	Artificial Instinct

=== with Tangerine Dream ===
- Catch Me If You Can (1989, OST released 1994)
- Deadly Care (1987, OST released 1992)
- L'Affaire Wallraff (The Man Inside) (1989, OST released 1991)
- Dead Solid Perfect (1989, OST released 1991)
- Canyon Dreams (1987 OST, released 1991)
- Melrose (1990)
- East (1990 concert, released 2004)
- Miracle Mile (1989)
- Lily on the Beach (1989)
- Rainbow Drive (1989, unreleased OST)
- Destination Berlin (1989)
- Rockface (1988 concert, released 2003)
- Optical Race (1988)
- Livemiles (1988)
- Near Dark (1987, OST released 1988)
- Shy People (1987, OST released 1988)
- Dead Solid Perfect (1988)
- Three O'Clock High (OST 1987)
- Tyger (1987)
- Zoning (1987)
- Red Nights (1987, unreleased OST)
- Tonight's the Night (1987, unreleased OST)
- Vault IV (1986 concerts, released 2005)
- Underwater Sunlight (1986)

=== Programmer for Graeme Revell ===
- Lara Croft: Tomb Raider (OST, 2001)
- Blow (2000)
- Red Planet (OST, 2000)
- Titan A.E. (2000)
- Pitch Black (2000)
- The Siege (OST, 1998)
- The Negotiator (1998)
- Phoenix (OST, 1998)
- Chinese Box (OST, 1997)

=== with Lightwave ===
- Bleue comme une orange (2004)
- Caryotype (2002)
- A Collection (Promo CD – 1999)
- Mundus Subterraneus (1995)
- Made to Measure (Cassette tape – 1994)
- Tycho Brahé (1993)
- Structure Trilogy (Cassette tape – 1991)

== Awards ==
- BMI Television Music Award – "Fear the Walking Dead" (2016)
- BMI Film Music Award – Underworld: Awakening (2012)
- BMI Film Music Award – Takers (2011)
- Emmy Nomination – Sleeper Cell (2006)
- Grammy Nomination (w/ Tangerine Dream) – Canyon Dreams (1991)
