= Beau Garrett =

American actress and model (born 1982)

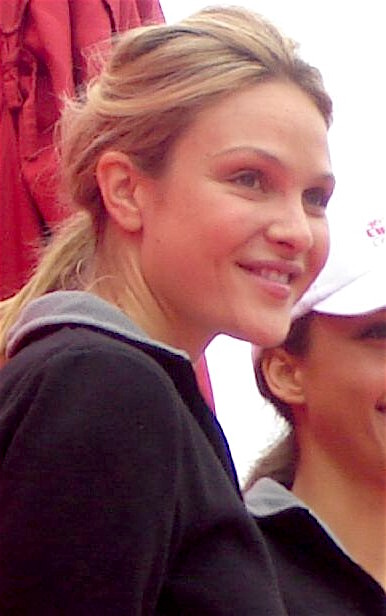
- Garrett in 2007
- Born: December 28, 1982 (age 43); Los Angeles, California, U.S.
- Occupations: Actress; model
- Years active: 1996–present
- Spouse: Shane Richards (m. 2025)
- Children: 1
- Modeling information
- Height: 5 ft 10 in (1.78 m)
- Hair color: Blond
- Eye color: Green
- Agency: Vision Models, Los Angeles

Beau Garrett (born December 28, 1982) is an American actress and model. She began her career appearing in GUESS advertisements in the late 1990s after being discovered by an Elite modeling agent at age fourteen. She made her feature film debut in the horror film Turistas (2006) before portraying Captain Raye in Fantastic Four: Rise of the Silver Surfer (2007) and Gem in Tron: Legacy (2010).

Garrett would later appear as a regular guest star on the television series Criminal Minds: Suspect Behavior (2011) and had a regular role on Girlfriends' Guide to Divorce from 2014 to 2018. In 2017, she portrayed Jessica Preston on the ABC series The Good Doctor. In 2026, she began the main role of Abigail Reese on the Paramount+ series The Madison.

== Early life ==
Garrett was born on December 28, 1982 in Los Angeles, California. She was raised in Topanga, California, in the Santa Monica Mountains where, as a child, she frequently rode horses. In her youth, Garrett became a competitive equestrian. She is the sister of Autumn Meisel (née Garrett) and the cousin of actor Kyle Chandler.

At age 13, Garrett was discovered by an agent from Elite Model Management while singing Christmas carols with her school's choir in a Los Angeles shopping mall. Her parents agreed to allow her to model to earn money to pay for her horse's boarding fees. She participated at the 1997 Elite Model Look beauty contest. Garrett worked professionally as a model from ages 14 to 21. Commenting on modeling at a young age, she said: "That was such a kind of strange and interesting time, those years, but it wasn’t sustainable for me."

== Career ==
She was first hired by Guess in the late 1990s. In 2008, she became a spokesmodel for Revlon cosmetics, along with Halle Berry, Jessica Biel, Jennifer Connelly and Jessica Alba, and has also modeled for Double D Ranch and CosmoGirl. She is signed to Vision Model Management, Los Angeles.

Garrett was the female lead in a music video for the song "Cold" by the band Crossfade in 2004, before making her feature film debut in the horror film Turistas (2006), opposite Josh Duhamel, Melissa George, and Olivia Wilde. Prior to appearing in film, Garret had made three appearances on television episodes including a pilot, as well as appearances on Entourage.

In 2007, she was cast in a supporting role as Frankie Raye in Fantastic Four: Rise of the Silver Surfer, the sequel to Fantastic Four. The following year, she had a minor role in the romantic comedy Made of Honor (2008).

In the spring of 2009, she filmed the 2010 film Tron: Legacy in Vancouver, British Columbia, opposite her Turistas co-star Olivia Wilde. In 2010, she also starred in the season-six House episode "Remorse", again with Wilde, as well as the independent crime film Freelancers (2010), starring 50 Cent, Forest Whitaker, and Robert De Niro.

In 2017, Garrett performed the role of attorney Jessica Preston in the hit ABC series The Good Doctor. She left the show after season one, but returned as a guest in season 4.

In 2024, Garrett was added to the cast of The Madison, a spinoff series of Yellowstone, that premiered on March 14, 2026.

== Personal life ==
Garrett has one child, a daughter born in January 2023. In September 2025, she married Canadian Shane Richards, a hotel and resort manager, at a ceremony in Montana.

== Filmography ==
=== Film ===
Year	Title	Role	Notes
2006	Turistas	Amy	
2007	Unearthed	Caya	
2007	Live!	Krista	
2007	Fantastic Four: Rise of the Silver Surfer	Captain Frankie Raye	
2008	Made of Honor	Gloria	
2009	Poolside	Lisa	Short film
2010	Ivory	Alicia	
2010	Kalamity	Alice	
2010	Tron: Legacy	Gem	
2012	Freelancers	Joey	
2013	Diving Normal	Ashton	
2014	Lust for Love	Mila	
2014	Five O'Clock Comes Early	Elaine	Unfinished
2015	Knight of Cups	Beau	
2015	In Stereo	Brenda Schiffer	

=== Television ===
Year	Title	Role	Notes
2004	North Shore	Natalia	Episode: "Meteor Shower"
2004	Entourage	Fiona	Episode: "The Script and the Sherpa"
2005	Head Cases	Fiona	Episode: "Pilot"
2007	Wildfire	Lynnet	Episode: "Moving On"
2009	Empire State	Annabelle Maddox	TV movie
2009	Celebrities Anonymous	Taylor	Unsold pilot
2010	Warren the Ape	Fresca	Episode: "It Girl"
2010	House	Valerie	Episode: "Remorse"
2010	Criminal Minds	Gina LaSalle	Episode: "The Fight"
2010	The Glades	Bailey Saunders	Episode: "Bird in the Hand"
2011	Criminal Minds: Suspect Behavior	Gina LaSalle	Main cast
2011	Memphis Beat	Claire Ryan	Episode: "At the River"
2011	CSI: NY	Ali Rand	3 episodes
2011	Chuck	Cult Leader	Episode: "Chuck Versus the Hack Off"
2014	Glee	Charlie Darling	Episode: "The Untitled Rachel Berry Project"
2014–2018	Girlfriends' Guide to Divorce	Phoebe Conte	Main cast
2016	Love by Chance	Claire Michaels	TV movie
2016	Longmire	Shawna Crawford	2 episodes
2017–2018, 2020	The Good Doctor	Jessica Preston	Main cast (season 1), guest episode (season 4)
2019	The Rookie	Denise	Episode: "Heartbreak"
2019	Capsized: Blood in the Water	Deborah "Deb" Scaling-Kiley	TV movie
2021–2023	Firefly Lane	Dorothy “Cloud” Hart	Main cast
2026–present	The Madison	Abigail Reese	Main cast
