= Nachtmusik (album) =

Studio album by Lightwave
- Released: 1990
- Recorded: May – July 1989
- Studio: Malibu Studio (Parmain, France)
- Genre: Dark ambient
- Length: 55:59
- Label: Erdenklang
- Producer: Lightwave

Lightwave chronology
Nachtmusik (1990)	Tycho Brahé (1993)

Professional ratings
Review scores
Source	Rating
Allmusic	4.5/5 stars

Nachtmusik is the debut studio album by Lightwave, released in 1990 by Erdenklang Musikverlag.

== Track listing ==
All music is composed by Christoph Harbonnier and Christian Wittman

No.	Title	Length
1.	"Nachtmusik"	23:30
2.	"Just Another Dream"	32:29

== Personnel ==
Adapted from the Nachtmusik liner notes.

Lightwave

- Christoph Harbonnier – electronics, sampler, illustrations
- Christian Wittman – electronics

Production and additional personnel

- Claude Chemin – illustrations
- Michel Geiss – mixing
- Mireille Landmann – mastering
- Lightwave – production
- Jean-Yves Lucas – illustrations

== Release history ==
Region	Date	Label	Format	Catalog
Germany	1990	Erdenklang	CD	90342
