= Cheetah Vision =

American film production company

- Type: Public
- Industry: Entertainment
- Founded: 2008
- Key people: Curtis '50 Cent' Jackson (CEO); Randall Emmett (President)

Cheetah Vision is a currently inactive American film production company founded in 2008 by Curtis '50 Cent' Jackson and Randall Emmett.

The company produced low budget action thrillers for foreign film markets across the world. The company's first film was Before I Self Destruct.

In early 2011, 50 Cent landed a $200,000,000 deal for the company, which funded a ten-film deal. Lionsgate distributed the films. Under the deal, the films had a budget of around $20 million each.

== Released films ==
- Before I Self Destruct (November 16, 2009)
- Caught in the Crossfire (July 13, 2010)
- Gun (January 4, 2011)
- Setup (September 20, 2011)
- All Things Fall Apart (February 14, 2012)
- Freelancers (August 10, 2012)
- Fire with Fire (November 6, 2012)
- Tapia (June 15, 2013)
- The Frozen Ground (July 19, 2013)
- Empire State (September 3, 2013)

== Music videos ==
- "Crime Wave" (From Before I Self-Destruct)
- "Stretch" (From Before I Self-Destruct)
