= Future Primitive (Paul Haslinger album) =

Album

Studio album by Paul Haslinger
- Released: October 25, 1994
- Recorded: January 1994–July 1994 at The Assembly Room, West Hollywood, California
- Genre: Electronic
- Length: 47:23
- Label: Wildcat Recording Corporation
- Producer: Paul Haslinger

Paul Haslinger chronology
Future Primitive (1994)	World Without Rules (1996)

Professional ratings
Review scores
Source	Rating
Allmusic	3/5 stars

Future Primitive is the debut album of Paul Haslinger, released on October 25, 1994, through Wildcat Recording Corporation.

== Track listing ==
All music is composed by Paul Haslinger

No.	Title	Length
1.	"Future Primitive"	4:47
2.	"Of Human Bondage"	4:21
3.	"Danc 'In-D M'Chine"	3:17
4.	"Urban Hypnotics"	3:36
5.	"Guidance Is Internal"	3:08
6.	"La Nuit M'Appelle"	4:24
7.	"D-Civilized"	2:52
8.	"Nine 4 One"	5:37
9.	"Saint & Robot"	4:01
10.	"Nomads in the Age of Wireless"	4:45
11.	"Time Harmonics"	2:40
12.	"Trancemigration"	3:55

== Personnel ==
- Charlie Campagna – guitar
- Daniel Galliduani – spoken word on "La Nuit M'Appelle"
- Paul Haslinger – instruments, production, mixing
- Nona Hendryx – vocals
- Iki Levy – percussion
- Clair Marlo – vocals
- Todd Washington – vocals
- Mitch Zelezny – mixing
