= Caught in the Crossfire =

- Directed by: Brian A Miller
- Written by: Brian A Miller
- Produced by: Randall Emmett; R.D. Miller Jr.
- Starring: Chris Klein; Adam Rodriguez; Richard T. Jones; Curtis "50 Cent" Jackson; Christine Lakin; Michael Matthias; Lyle Kanouse
- Cinematography: William Eubank
- Edited by: Bob Mori
- Music by: Erin Davis
- Production companies: Miller Roth Films; Cheetah Vision
- Distributed by: Fabrication Films; Lionsgate Home Entertainment (DVD); Gulf Film (Theatrical)
- Release date: July 13, 2010
- Running time: 85 minutes
- Country: United States
- Language: English
- Budget: $1 million
- Box office: $11,850

Caught in the Crossfire is 2010 American crime drama film directed by Brian A Miller. It stars Chris Klein, Adam Rodríguez, 50 Cent, and Richard T. Jones, and follows two police detectives who investigate a gang-related shooting and become the target of attacks from both gang members and corrupt cops.

The film was released direct-to-video on July 13, 2010.

== Premise ==
Two detectives caught in a crossfire between dirty cops and gangland members.

== Cast ==
- Chris Klein as Briggs
- Adam Rodríguez as Shepherd
- 50 Cent as Tino
- Richard T. Jones as Captain Emmett
- Christine Lakin as Tracy
- Michael Matthias as Lieutenant Michaels
- Lyle Kanouse as Detective Evans
- R.D. Miller Jr. as Benton
- Brian A Miller as A.D.A. Kevin Andrews
- Sydney Hall as Michael Pips
- Tim Fields as Lerner
- Roy Oraschin as Johnson
- Alyssa Julya Smith as Sarah Jackson
- Kurt Race as Andre Cruz

== Production ==
In June 2009, 50 Cent, Chris Klein and Adam Rodriguez were cast in Caught in the Crossfire. Part of the filming took place in Grand Rapids, Michigan.

== Release ==
Caught in the Crossfire premiered on May 11, 2010, at the Celebration Cinema North in Grand Rapids, Michigan. The film was released direct-to-video by Lionsgate Home Entertainment on July 13, 2010.
