= All Things Fall Apart =

2011 film by Mario Van Peebles

- Poster with working title Things Fall Apart
- Directed by: Mario Van Peebles
- Written by: Curtis Jackson; Brian A. Miller
- Produced by: Randall Emmett
- Starring: Curtis Jackson; Ray Liotta; Mario Van Peebles; Lynn Whitfield
- Cinematography: Matthew Irving
- Edited by: Bob Mori; Kirk M. Mori
- Music by: Tree Adams
- Production company: Cheetah Vision
- Distributed by: Image Entertainment
- Release date: March 5, 2011 (Miami International Film Festival)
- Running time: 110 minutes
- Country: United States
- Language: English
- Budget: $7 million

All Things Fall Apart is a 2011 American direct-to-video drama film directed by Mario Van Peebles and starring Curtis "50 Cent" Jackson, Ray Liotta, Mario Van Peebles, and Lynn Whitfield. It was filmed in Michigan and premiered at the Miami International Film Festival.

== Plot ==
Deon, a skilled college running back, falls ill from a genetic disease just when he is about to go realize his dreams and advance to the NFL, a professional American Football league. Though idolized for his athletic ability, Deon shares the glory on and off of the football field. His mother Bee is incredibly proud and his younger brother Sean understandably jealous. Eric, Deon's stepfather, sees the football star as a winning lottery ticket. Deon's doctor, Dr. Brintall, informs him that he can't play football again, but there is always hope. While fighting cancer, Deon seeks to finish what he started. In the end, while at a catering party, he runs towards the football field just like the good old times and raises his arms, pretending that he has scored a touchdown.

== Cast ==
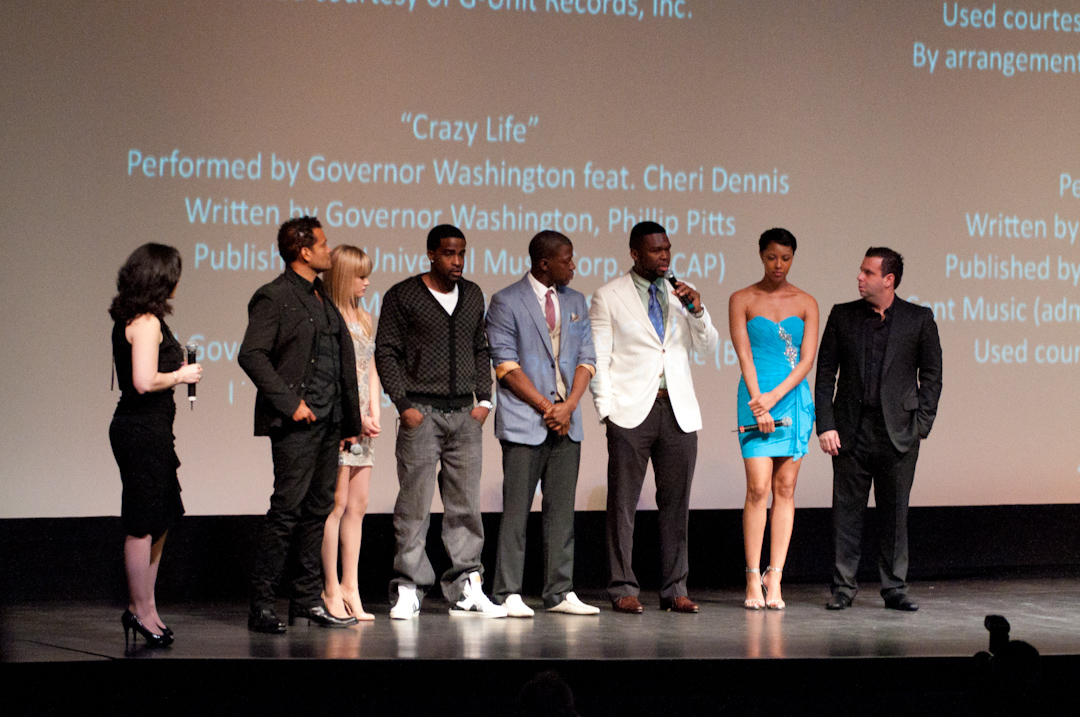
The cast of All Things Fall Apart at the 2011 Miami International Film Festival showing

- Curtis "50 Cent" Jackson as Deon
- Ray Liotta as Dr. Brintall
- Mario Van Peebles as Eric
- Lynn Whitfield as Bee
- Ambyr Childers as Sherry
- Elizabeth Rodriguez as Mrs. Lopez
- Cedric Sanders as Sean
- Tracey Heggins as Sharon
- Steve Eastin as Coach Harper
- Chanel Farrell as Carey

== Production ==
Jackson, who based his character on a childhood friend who died of cancer, lost up to 54 pounds in order to accurately portray his emaciated character, dropping from "214 pounds to 160 in nine weeks after liquid dieting and running on a treadmill three hours a day".

The film was produced under the same title as Chinua Achebe's 1958 postcolonial novel Things Fall Apart. After being contacted by Achebe's legal team, Jackson offered $1 million to keep the title Things Fall Apart for the film. Achebe took this as an insult. The foundation that manages Achebe's copyrights stated, "The novel with the said title was initially produced in 1958. It is listed as the most-read book in modern African literature, and won't be sold for even £1 billion." The film was renamed to All Things Fall Apart.

== See also ==
- List of Black films of the 2010s
