= Freelancers (film) =

- DVD cover
- Directed by: Jessy Terrero
- Written by: L. Philippe Casseus
- Produced by: Mark Canton; 50 Cent; Randall Emmett; Brandon Grimes; Sefton Fincham; George Furla; Gus Furla
- Starring: 50 Cent; Forest Whitaker; Robert De Niro
- Cinematography: Igor Martinovic
- Edited by: Kirk M. Morri
- Music by: Reg B
- Production companies: Grindstone Entertainment Group; Cheetah Vision; Emmett/Furla Films; Envision Entertainment Corporation
- Distributed by: Lionsgate
- Release date: August 10, 2012
- Running time: 96 minutes
- Country: United States
- Language: English
- Budget: $13.5 million
- Box office: $456,350

Freelancers is a 2012 American action film directed by Jessy Terrero, written by L. Philippe Casseus and starring 50 Cent, Forest Whitaker and Robert De Niro. It had a limited release in Los Angeles and New York on August 10, 2012, with a simultaneous VOD release, and was released on DVD and Blu-ray on August 21, 2012.

== Plot ==
Jonas Maldonado, the son of a slain NYPD officer, joins the police academy with his two best friends. After graduating, he is taken under the wing of his father's former partner Captain Joe Sarcone, who invites him to join the Street Vice Crime Task Force.

Under Sarcone's tutelage, he becomes part of a rogue task force that consists of dirty cops. After he learns from the District Attorney's office that his father was murdered by Sarcone after turning state's evidence, Maldonado frames Sarcone for a theft from powerful mob boss Gabriel Baez.

Baez orders Maldonado to kill one of his friends as a sign of loyalty, which he reluctantly does. With Baez's help, Maldonado kills the dirty cops responsible for his father's death. At the end, the Drug Enforcement Agency approaches Maldonado, urges him not to take Sarcone's place as Baez's right-hand man, and Maldonado ponders whether to go straight or not.

== Cast ==
- 50 Cent as Jonas "Malo" Maldonado
- Forest Whitaker as Lieutenant Dennis Lureu
- Robert De Niro as Captain Joe Sarcone
- Matt Gerald as Billy Morrison
- Beau Garrett as Joey
- Malcolm Goodwin as A.D. Valburn
- Ryan O'Nan as Lucas
- Robert Wisdom as Terrence Burke
- Dana Delany as Lydia Vecchio
- Vinnie Jones as Sully
- Pedro Armendariz Jr. as Gabriel Baez
- Michael McGrady as Robert Jude
- Andre Royo as Daniel Maldonado
- Jeff Chase as Angie
- Jesse Pruett as Mercer Bartender
- Anabelle Acosta as Cyn

== Production ==
In February 2011, Variety announced that 50 Cent will play a lead role in the film. He will star as the "son of a slain NYPD officer who joins the force and welcomed by his father's former partner into the ranks of his vice crime task force—and on to a team of rogue Gotham cops".

A month later, Deadline reported that Robert De Niro and Forest Whitaker had joined the film. Variety announced in May 2011 that Dana Delany would play a lead female role. 50 Cent said that he felt compassion for his character despite the character's ambiguous morality. That and other aspects of the film from which he could identify his own experiences drew him to the project.

== Release ==
Freelancers had a limited release on August 10, 2012, and was released on home video on August 21, 2012. It was number 6 in the top-ten DVD and Blu-ray rentals in the week of August 30, 2012.

== Reception ==
The film received generally negative reviews from critics. R. L. Shaffer of IGN rated it 3 of 10 and wrote, "Freelancers is a dull, lifeless cop drama built on cliches, powered by throwaway supporting performances from Forest Whitaker and Robert De Niro."

William Harrison of DVD Talk rated it 1½ of 5, and wrote, "Freelancers gives its audience nothing it hasn't seen a hundred times before in better cop dramas. This tale of corruption and retaliation is predictable and largely uninteresting, and actors 50 Cent, Robert De Niro and Forest Whitaker do little more than go through the motions."

Gordon Sullivan of DVD Verdict called it a derivative and forgettable cop drama with a good cast.
