= Sydney Hall (actor) =

American actor, model and dancer (born 1975)

- Born: May 12, 1975 (age 51); West Hartford, Connecticut

Sydney Hall is an American actor, model and dancer.

== Education ==
Hall completed his schooling at Northwest Catholic High School in West Hartford, Connecticut in 1991. He subsequently attended Howard University in Washington, D.C., where he obtained a BA. He is a member of the Alpha Phi Alpha fraternity.

== South Africa ==
In 1994, Hall travelled to Soweto in Johannesburg, South Africa as part of the Step Afrika! stepping dance troupe of fraternity brothers. He lived in South Africa for several years, working as a model and actor. He also owned a nightclub there. He played the character Dr CL Phunk in a series of retro television commercials commencing in 2002 for the Chicken Licken fast-food restaurant chain.

== Filmography ==
=== Film ===
- Lord of War (2005)
- The Deal (2008)
- Caught in the Crossfire (2010)

=== Television ===
- Coup! (2006)
- Generation Kill (2008)
- Intelligence: "The Grey Hat" (2014)
