= Setup (2011 film) =

2011 action film by Mike Gunther

- DVD cover
- Directed by: Mike Gunther
- Written by: Mike Behrman; Mike Gunther
- Produced by: Randall Emmett; Curtis Jackson; George Furla
- Starring: 50 Cent; Bruce Willis; Ryan Phillippe; Jenna Dewan; Brett Granstaff; Randy Couture; Will Yun Lee; Shaun Toub; Susie Abromeit; Rory Markham; Jay Karnes; James Remar
- Cinematography: Steve Gainer
- Edited by: Mark Stevens
- Music by: The Newton Brothers
- Production companies: Grindstone Entertainment Group; Emmett/Furla Films; Cheetah Vision
- Distributed by: Lionsgate (North America and United Kingdom)
- Release date: September 20, 2011
- Running time: 85 minutes
- Country: United States
- Language: English
- Box office: $2.1 million

Setup is a direct-to-video action thriller heist film directed by Mike Gunther and written by Gunther and Mike Behrman. It stars Curtis "50 Cent" Jackson, Bruce Willis and Ryan Phillippe.

It was released straight to DVD and Blu-ray on September 20, 2011 in the United States.

== Plot ==
In Detroit three friends, Sonny (50 Cent), Dave (Brett Granstaff), and Vincent (Ryan Phillippe), plan out a detailed heist of $5 million in diamonds. Their plans turn deadly when Vincent betrays the others, shooting Sonny and Dave. Dave dies on the spot, while Sonny manages to survive and seeks revenge by teaming up with Biggs (Bruce Willis), the most dangerous mob boss in town, to retrieve the money from the heist.

Biggs sends Sonny, along with one of his henchmen, Petey, to retrieve $2 million buried in a cemetery. They get the money and Petey puts the money in the trunk of his car, but he accidentally shoots himself. Sonny brings Petey's body to the Butcher. He follows a girl named Mia to the fence's home and threatens him. The fence runs to Vincent saying that he has to clean up his mess because he left Sonny alive as a loose end. Vincent kills him in response.

Biggs inquires about Petey and Sonny. Sal interrogates Ivan to death trying to find out information on Petey. Sonny heads to the church where the pastor asks, "do you believe in free will? the idea that you are free to make your own choices in this world?". Sonny replies "of course", the pastor continues, "then how could you make a choice between right and wrong if God did not offer the two extremes?". Vincent seeks John's help to close on the Sonny loose end. Sonny visits the cemetery and Dave's grave.

Sonny visits the Prison where Vincent's father is and he asks if there is “anything you want me to ask your son before I kill him?”. Mia is attacked in her home by the owner of the diamonds demanding his diamonds back. Vincent visits Mia and finds her dead body.

Sal and Tony interrogate another Russian who says "the black man took the money that's all I see, he took it." After the Russian dies in interrogation, Biggs says "I think he was telling the truth".

Vincent meets with Saunders in the prison, who extorts him for $100,000 in protection money to protect his father. Vincent visits his father who divulges that he knows that Sonny is alive and he visited him. He tells his son "Big men make big moves, are you a big man?".

Sonny takes some of Biggs' $2 million and puts it into a Teddy Bear and then into a Box. Then, Sonny goes to Biggs and falsely claims that Vincent has his money. John arranges a meeting with Vincent and Biggs. Biggs demands his money; and there is a shootout with many casualties. Sonny chases Vincent but is eluded by him. The owner of the diamonds breaks into Vincent's home and confronts him as he is packing away his money, but he kills him. Sonny ambushes Vincent just as he is about to open his car door. Sonny dowses him in oil and asks Vincent to dig his own grave. Vincent confesses that he was forced to kill Sonny and Dave because Saunders had threatened to kill his father; and that he needed all of the money to get out of trouble. Sonny spares his life. In the next scene, pans to the prison where Vincent's father is and he is murdered by another inmate. Dave's girlfriend receives the package with the Teddy bear with the money put there by Sonny. Sonny takes the money from the locker and quips "An eye for an eye leaves everyone blind. As i was not my brother's keeper, neither was I his killer. I could live with the fact that Vincent was still alive. Question was, could he?" Sonny drives off - cut to credits.

== Cast ==
- 50 Cent as Sonny
- Bruce Willis as Biggs
- Ryan Phillippe as Vincent
- Jenna Dewan as Mia
- Randy Couture as Petey
- James Remar as William
- Brett Granstaff as Dave
- Will Yun Lee as Joey
- Shaun Toub as Roth
- Susie Abromeit as Valerie
- Rory Markham as Markus
- Jay Karnes as Russell
- Ambyr Childers as Waitress Haley
- Omar Dorsey as G Money
- Richard Goteri as John R
- Michael Mili as Gangster 1

== Production ==
Filming began in November 2010 in Grand Rapids, Michigan. Set Up is the first film in a $200 million deal with the production companies; Randall Emmett and 50 Cent's Cheetah Vision and George Furla's Hedge Fund Film Partners. Lionsgate distributed the film in the United States and Canada under the Grindstone Entertainment Group label and in a few international territories including the UK.

== Box office ==
As of November 11, 2022, Setup grossed $2,140,476 in the United Arab Emirates, Russia, Spain, Portugal, Hungary, and Lebanon.
