= Fire with Fire (2012 film) =

2012 American action thriller film by David Barrett

- Promotional poster
- Directed by: David Barrett
- Written by: Tom O'Connor
- Produced by: 50 Cent; Andrew Deane; Randall Emmett
- Starring: Josh Duhamel; Bruce Willis; Vincent D'Onofrio; Rosario Dawson; Nnamdi Asomugha
- Cinematography: Christopher Probst
- Edited by: Paul Harb
- Music by: Trevor Morris
- Production companies: Grindstone Entertainment Group; Cheetah Vision; Emmett/Furla Films
- Distributed by: Lionsgate
- Release date: November 6, 2012
- Running time: 96 minutes
- Country: United States
- Language: English
- Box office: $2.5 million

Fire with Fire is a 2012 American action thriller film directed by David Barrett starring Josh Duhamel, Bruce Willis, Vincent D'Onofrio and Rosario Dawson. Duhamel plays a firefighter forced to confront a neo-Nazi murderer. The film was released direct-to-video on DVD and Blu-ray on November 6, 2012.

== Plot ==
Following a grueling day of work, Long Beach, California firefighter Jeremy Coleman and his coworkers contemplate ending the day with a case of 15-year-old Scotch whisky. Jeremy enters a convenience store to buy snacks, but is interrupted by David Hagan, an Aryan Brotherhood crime boss. He accuses the store owner of refusing to sell his store which Hagan wants to further his criminal enterprise. The store owner says he buys protection from the Eastside Crips and the store is in their territory so it would not be useful for Hagan's purposes.

Hagan kills the store owner's son and then the store owner. Coleman narrowly escapes. Police detective Mike Cella, whose former partner was murdered by Hagan while they pursued him in a different case, sees an opportunity to finally bring him to justice. Hagan is detained and put into a police lineup. Hagan, sure that Coleman is behind the one-way mirror, recites Coleman's full name, address and Social Security number.

Before the trial, Coleman agrees to enter the witness protection program, and changes his last name to Douglas. He leaves the fire department and is moved to New Orleans. Although he finds it difficult to cope with the loss of his career, he finds consolation in his budding romance with Talia Durham, a Deputy United States Marshal assigned to his case. Coleman and Durham find their lives in jeopardy when two of Hagan's hitmen ambush them; though Durham is wounded, Coleman mortally wounds one man, forcing them to retreat. Hagan calls Coleman, threatening to kill everyone he loves whether he testifies or not. Coleman vows to kill Hagan first and abandons the witness protection program. Later, Hagan's attorney, Harold Gethers, arranges for him to be released from prison in the weeks leading up to the trial.

Coleman returns home to Long Beach, where he seeks out the Eastside Crips to buy an untraceable weapon. He stakes out one of Hagan's hiding places and kills three of his men. Coleman leaves behind a partial fingerprint but the police cannot identify him because his identity is protected by his United States Federal Witness Protection Program status. Cella figures out that Coleman is behind the deaths, but is conflicted due to his own hatred for Hagan. Coleman identifies the location of one of Hagan's buildings and tortures one of Hagan's men, who directs him to Gethers. Gethers, who only works for Hagan out of fear, gives him the location of an abandoned building where Hagan will be that night.

Durham arrives at Long Beach and tries to convince Coleman to abandon his plan. He locks her in the bathroom and gets away, but Hagan's hitman arrives soon after and kidnaps her. That night, Coleman, using his firefighting knowledge, sets the building where Hagan and his men are meeting on fire, killing Hagan's men. When he realizes that Durham is also in the building, he puts on his fireman's suit and enters the building to rescue her. She manages to break free of her bonds and kills Hagan's hitman in revenge as he attempts to flee the blaze. Coleman runs into Hagan inside the burning building and, after a struggle, Durham kills Hagan, and leaves the building with Coleman. In the aftermath, Cella, while conversing with the district attorney, states that no evidence was left behind at the burnt building to charge anyone with the deaths of Hagan and his men. Cella is seen putting away a photo of him and his old partner.

== Cast ==
- Josh Duhamel as Jeremy Coleman
- Bruce Willis as Detective Lt. Mike Cella
- Rosario Dawson as Deputy Talia Durham
- Vincent D'Onofrio as David Hagan
- Curtis Jackson as Lamar
- Richard Schiff as Criminal Attorney Harold Gethers
- Quinton "Rampage" Jackson as Wallace
- Vinnie Jones as Boyd
- Arie Verveen as Darren
- Eric Winter as Adam
- Bonnie Somerville as Assistant District Attorney Sharon Westlake
- Julian McMahon as Robert
- Kevin Dunn as Marshall Calvin Mullen
- James Lesure as Craig Tucker
- Nnamdi Asomugha as Sherrod
- Scott A Martin as Kane

== Release ==
Fire with Fire was released direct-to-video in the United States on November 6, 2012. As of February 7, 2026, Fire with Fire grossed $2,500,277 in the United Arab Emirates, Italy, South Africa, Portugal, Belgium, the United Kingdom, Mexico, Brazil, Peru, Colombia, Malaysia, and Hong Kong and $2,376,062 in domestic sales on home video.

== Reception ==
On the review aggregator website Rotten Tomatoes, 7% of 15 critics' reviews are positive, with an average rating of 3.2/10.

Mark Adams of Screen Daily wrote that it is a misfire with a story that is "more silly than exciting". Tom Huddleston of Time Out London rated it 3/5 stars and called it "a sturdy, unambitious but thoroughly watchable action thriller." Nathan Rabin of The A.V. Club wrote that it "could be a lot worse" and "is cheesy but moderately effective." Paul Bradshaw of Total Film rated it 3/5 stars and called it a "daft, generic revenger". Olly Richards of Empire rated it 1/5 stars and wrote, "Avoid like the plague. The nasty Bubonic kind." Henry Barnes of The Guardian rated it 1/5 stars and called it too violent and clichéd. Tyler Foster of DVD Talk rated it 3.5/5 stars and said that it gives its demographic exactly what they want but no more. Gordon Sullivan of DVD Verdict called it a clichéd, mediocre B movie.

== See also ==
- Bruce Willis filmography
