= Sidney Hall =

British engraver and cartographer

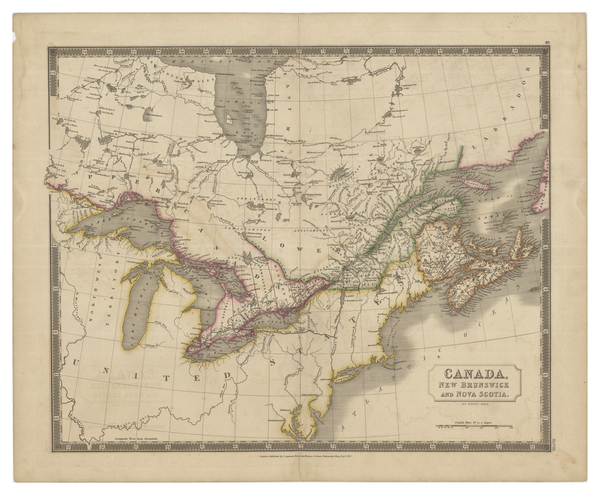
Canada, New Brunswick and Nova Scotia by Sidney Hall (1830)

Sidney Hall (1788?–1831) was a British engraver and cartographer well known and popular for his early nineteenth century atlases containing maps of the United Kingdom and of the ancient world reproduced from Hall's engravings. Hall made engravings for a number of international atlases at a time when cartography and atlases were very popular. He also engraved a series of cards for the various constellations, published c.1825 in a boxed set called Urania's Mirror.

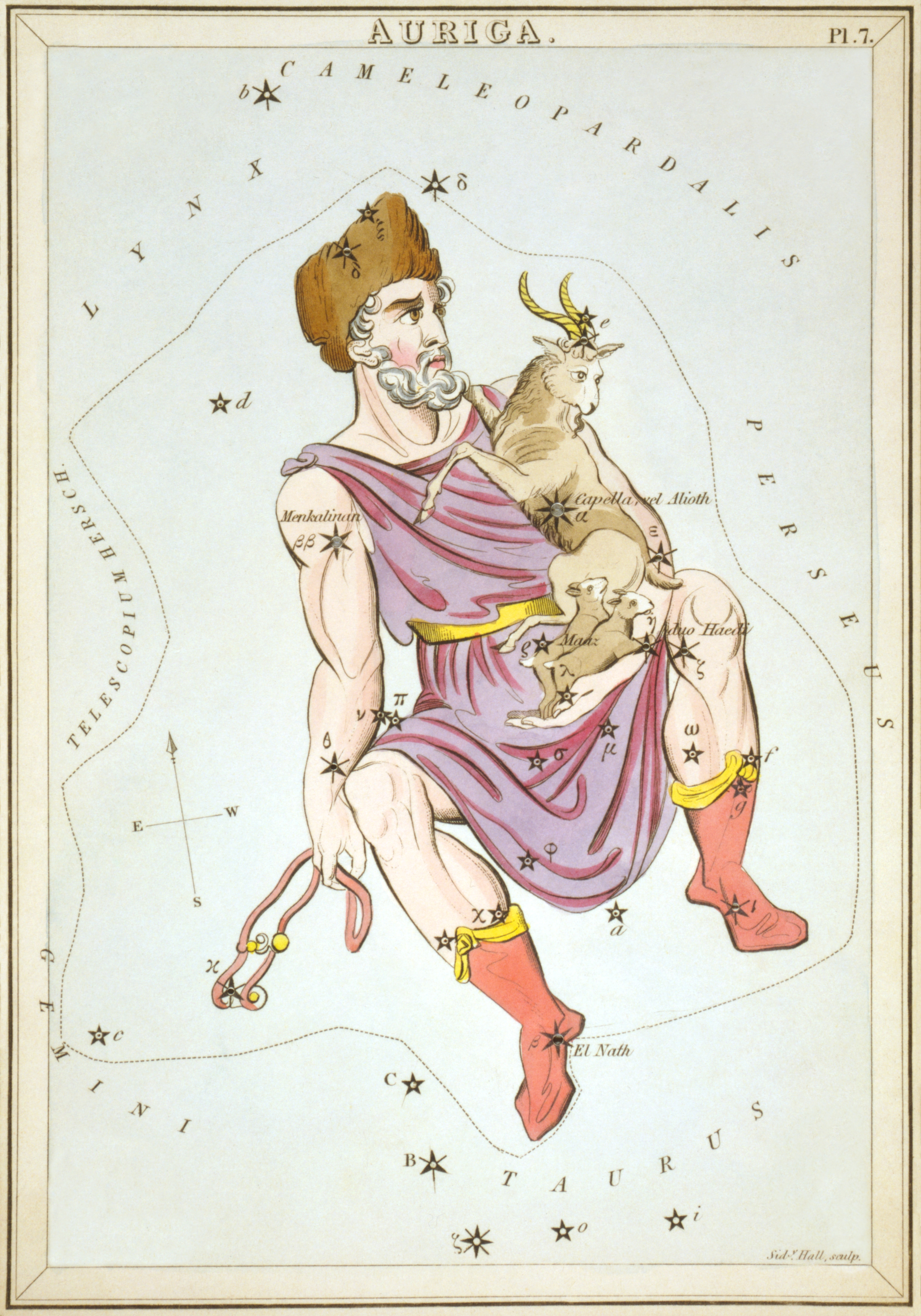
Sidney Hall's punched star chart of the constellation Auriga.

Hall engraved maps for William Faden, Aaron Arrowsmith, and Chapman & Hall, among many others.

In 1809 he operated at 5 Vine Street, Picadilly, London. In 1814 he was in partnership with Michael Thomson operating at 14 Bury Street in the Bloomsbury District and later was listed at 18 Bury Street. Hall is credited with "almost certainly" being the first engraver to use steel plates in map engraving.

Hall died in 1831 at the age of 42. The business was carried on by map engraver Selina Hall, his widow.
