= Son huasteco =

Traditional Mexican musical style

- Stylistic origins: Son, Fandango español
- Cultural origins: 18th century Sierra Huasteca
- Typical instruments: Violin, Guitarra huapanguera, Jarana

Subgenres
- Huapango

Other topics
- Charro - Jarabe tapatío - Zapateado-Mariachi

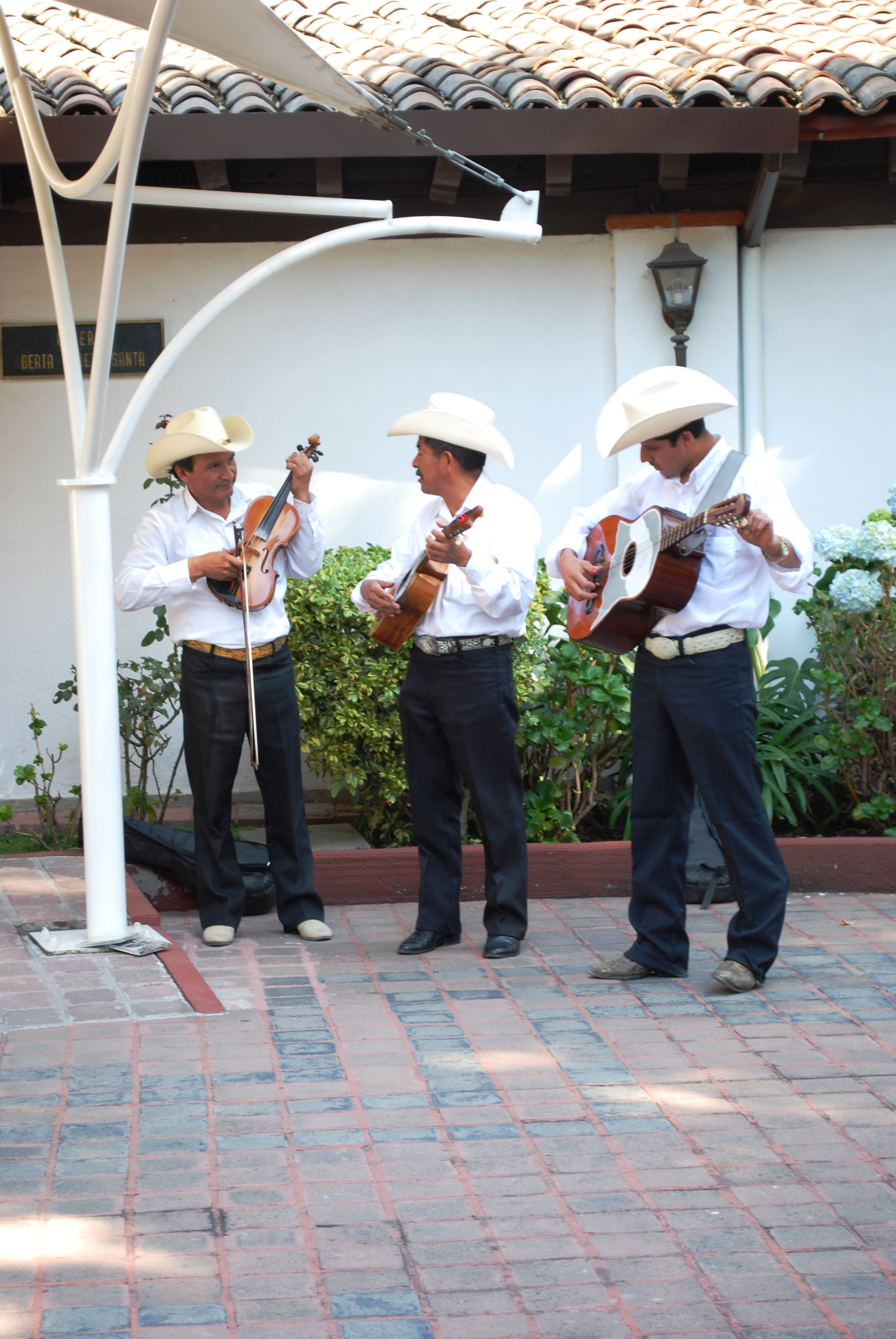
Son huasteca trio at the Alfredo Guati Rojo National Watercolor Museum in Mexico City

El pitorreal

La malagueña

Son huasteco is one of eight Mexican song styles and is a traditional Mexican musical style originating in the six-state area of Northeastern Mexico called La Huasteca. It dates back to the end of the 19th century and is influenced by Spanish and indigenous cultures. Usually it is played by a Trio Huasteco composed of a guitarra quinta huapanguera (a five course, eight stringed guitar-like instrument), a Jarana huasteca (a stringed instrument related to the jarana), and a violin. Singers will often use the falsetto register. The son huasteco is particularly noteworthy for its flamboyant and virtuoso violin parts, although the style varies from state to state. Footwork often danced to son huasteco is the Zapateado. Improvisation plays a strong role in the style, with musicians creating their own lyrics and arrangements to a standard repertoire. Typical sones huastecos are "Cielito Lindo", "La huazanga", "La sirena", "El querreque", and "La cigarra". (Note: Related genres are Son Jarocho and Fandango español.)
