= Guitarra chamula =

Mexican stringed instrument

Guitarra Chamula
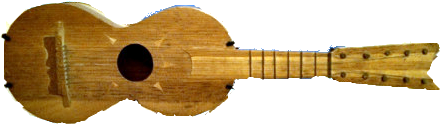
- Guitarra chamula

String instrument
- Classification: String instrument
- Hornbostel–Sachs classification: (Composite chordophone)
- Developed: Jalisco and Michoacán, Mexico

Related instruments
- Mexican vihuela, Guitarrón mexicano, Huapanguera, Jarana huasteca, Guitar.

The Guitarra chamula is a stringed instrument from San Juan Chamula, Chiapas, Mexico. It has 10 or 12 metal strings of all the same thickness in 4 courses, with a tuning of aaa d'd'd' bbb e'e'e'. It is used traditionally within local festivals together with a Mexican harp and a harmonica.
