= Mexicanism =

Mexicanism may be:

- a linguistic feature peculiar to Mexican Spanish
- Mexican patriotism, especially among expatriate Mexican Americans, see Chicano Movement
- a synonym for Mexicayotl, a religious and traditional movement, see Antonio Velasco Piña

== See also ==
- Mexicanisimo, a 2010 album by Yanni
