= Aurea Aguilar =

Mexican multimedia visual artist

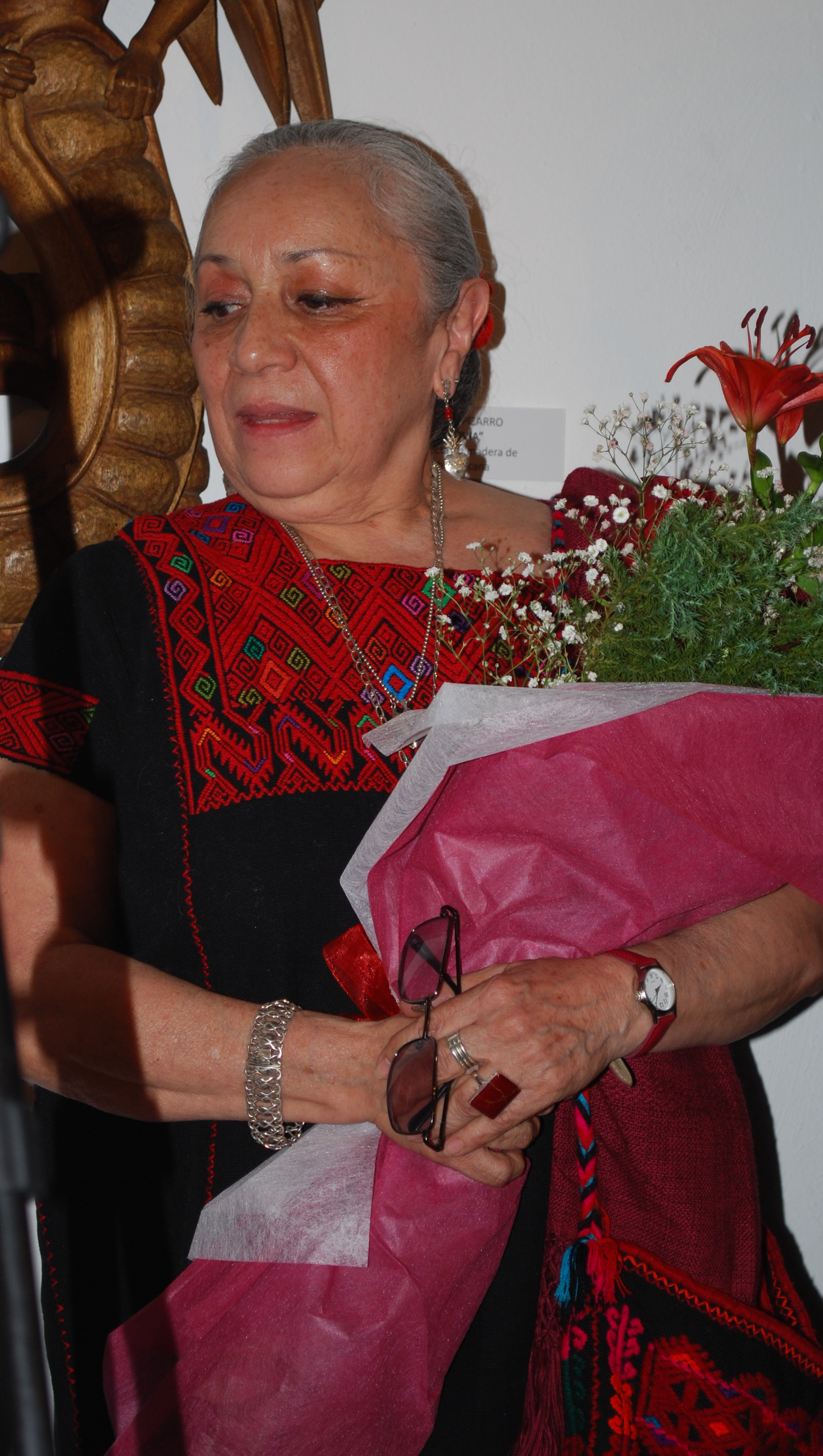
Aurea Aguilar at the opening of the Salvador Pìzarro, Aurea Aguilar y la Colectiva cuatro elementos exhibit at the Salon de la Plástica Mexicana in Mexico City

Aurea Aguilar (born September 1943) is a Mexican multimedia visual artist whose work has been recognized with membership in Mexico's Salón de la Plástica Mexicana.

== Life ==
Aguilar was born in Mexico City, the second child of Celia Ferrer and César Aguirre. Her mother was a journalist, writer and self-taught painter. Her father was a lawyer and writer. Since childhood, she had an interest in Mexican culture and artistic expression, studying traditional Mexican folk dance and maintaining interest in literature and music as well as art.

She possesses a quite, introverted nature, choosing to observe her surroundings before speaking.

She currently lives in Mexico City.

== Career ==
She studied art at the Academy of San Carlos, where student political activism formed her political and artistic outlook.

She was accepted as a member of the Salón de la Plástica Mexicana in 1998 and has exhibited with the institution since, including the 2012 exhibit “Ausencias y presencias.”

== Artistry ==
Her art is strongly influenced by human suffering, physical, mental and emotional, to which she is sensitive. She works in various materials and media including drawing, etching, oil painting, screen printing and the creation of three-dimensional art objects, especially those in book form.

Aguilar's imagery is derived from various eras of Mexico's history, especially the syncretism of pre Hispanic and Catholic religious beliefs as they affect the country's modern culture. Dominant elements include the human heart, the human hand, skulls and crosses. In Ausencias y presencias, one of the pieces is an urn she designed in which her own remains lie. She has stated that the creation of pieces have a cathartic effect.
