= The Essential Yanni =

Compilation album by Yanni
- Released: June 15, 2010
- Genre: Instrumental
- Length: 164:16
- Label: Legacy
- Producer: Yanni

Yanni chronology
| Yanni Voices (2009) | The Essential Yanni (2010) | The Inspiring Journey (2010) |

Professional ratings
Review scores
| Source | Rating |
|---|---|
| AllMusic | 3.5/5 stars |

The Essential Yanni is a compilation album by keyboardist and composer Yanni, released on the Legacy label in 2010. The album peaked at #6 on Billboard's "Top New Age Albums" chart in 2010.

== Track listing ==
Disc 1

| No. | Title | Length |
|---|---|---|
| 1. | "Paths on Water" | 3:53 |
| 2. | "Reflections of Passion" | 4:33 |
| 3. | "Nightbird" | 6:02 |
| 4. | "Nice to Meet You" | 5:36 |
| 5. | "Within Attraction" | 4:10 |
| 6. | "Santorini" | 4:35 |
| 7. | "Niki Nana (We're One)" | 5:21 |
| 8. | "The End of August" | 4:52 |
| 9. | "Marching Season" | 5:35 |
| 10. | "After the Sunrise" | 4:38 |
| 11. | "Enchantment" | 3:51 |
| 12. | "Chasing Shadows" | 5:43 |
| 13. | "The Mermaid" | 3:46 |
| 14. | "One Man's Dream" | 2:43 |
| 15. | "Running Time" | 5:58 |
| 16. | "Flight of Fantasy" | 5:40 |

Disc 2

| No. | Title | Length |
|---|---|---|
| 1. | "Walkabout" | 4:31 |
| 2. | "Desire" | 5:00 |
| 3. | "Someday" | 4:35 |
| 4. | "Point of Origin" | 5:55 |
| 5. | "Butterfly Dance" | 6:24 |
| 6. | "Swept Away" | 4:41 |
| 7. | "Forbidden Dreams" | 3:56 |
| 8. | "In the Morning Light" | 3:48 |
| 9. | "Turn of the Tide" | 3:55 |
| 10. | "A Word in Private" | 3:44 |
| 11. | "Standing in Motion" | 5:20 |
| 12. | "Human Condition" | 5:09 |
| 13. | "The Rain Must Fall" (from Live at the Acropolis) | 7:17 |
| 14. | "Face in the Photograph" | 3:45 |
| 15. | "In the Mirror" | 4:02 |
| 16. | "Before I Go" | 4:30 |

== Production ==
- A&R: Didier Deutsch
- Mastering Engineer: Maria Triana
- Product Development: David Foil & Jennifer Liebeskind
- Marketing: Leslie Collman-Smith & Scott Farthing
- Art Direction & Design: Roxanne Slimax
- Photography: Lynn Goldsmith
- Packaging Manager: Tammy Van Aken

(Production as described in CD liner notes.)
