= Mexicanisimo =

Studio album by Yanni
- Released: November 11, 2010
- Genre: Latin
- Length: 39:43
- Label: Venemusic
- Producer: Yanni

Yanni chronology
The Inspiring Journey (2010)	Mexicanisimo (2010)	Truth of Touch (2011)

Alternative Cover
- English version

Professional ratings
Review scores
Source	Rating
AllMusic	3/5 stars

Mexicanisimo is the thirteenth studio album by keyboardist Yanni, released on Venemusic label in 2010. The album peaked at #15 on Billboard's "Regional Mexican Albums" chart, at #2 on Billboard's "Top New Age Albums" chart and at #31 on "Billboard's "Top Latin Albums" chart in the same year.

== Background ==
The album is a musical tribute to Mexico during its period of bicentennial celebrations. Yanni has collaborated with Mexican producer Manuel Cázares to interpret many Mexican songs that embrace the country's heritage. The album features performances by guest stars Lucero ("Mi Ciudad") and Pepe Aguilar ("Silverio Peréz").

== Track listing ==
No.	Title	Writer(s)	Length
1.	"El Cascabel" (Son)	Lorenzo Barcelata	3:31
2.	"Granada" (Paso doble)	Agustín Lara	3:52
3.	"La Bikina" (Huapango)	Alejandro Roth, Rubén Fuentes	2:34
4.	"El Son De La Negra" (Son)	Silvestre Vargas, Fuentes	3:06
5.	"Cielito Lindo" (Ranchera)	Quirino Mendoza	3:08
6.	"Silverio Pérez" (Paso doble; featuring Pepe Aguilar)	Lara	2:36
7.	"Guadalajara" (Ranchera)	Pepe Guízar, Paul Lynn	3:09
8.	"Mi Ciudad" (Ranchera; featuring Lucero)	Guadalupe Trigo, Eduardo Salas	3:41
9.	"María Bonita" (Vals)	Lara	3:05
10.	"La Culebra" (Son)	Vargas, Fuentes	2:54
11.	"La Malagueña" (Huapango)	Ernesto Lecuona	4:29
12.	"México Lindo y Querido" (Ranchera)	Jesús Monge	3:16

== Credits ==
- José Luis Aguilar - Harp
- Alfredo Nava - Vocals
- Amador Bedolla - Cello
- Rubén Bedolla - Viola
- Luis René Cárdenas (Boro) - Recording and mixing
- Javier Carrillo - Arrangements
- Iris Alejandrina Cázares - Copyist
- Manuel Cazares - Arrangements
- Isabel Frenk - Cello
- Patricia Hernández - Viola
- Jorge Jimarez - Vocals
- José Manuel Jiménez - Vihuela
- Julio Lizarraga - Arrangements
- Luz María - Cello
- Mariachi Águilas De México - Vocals
- Angel Ramos - Sax (Soprano)
- David Rivera - Guitarrón
- Cristobal Rodales - Harp
- Alfredo Solis - Vocals
- Yanni - Piano, production
- Manuel Cázares - Executive producer
