= Truth of Touch =

Studio album by Yanni
- Released: February 8, 2011
- Genre: Crossover, easy listening, new-age Electronic
- Length: 61:59
- Label: Yanni/Wake
- Producer: Yanni

Yanni chronology
Mexicanisimo (2010)	Truth of Touch (2011)	Live at El Morro, Puerto Rico (2012)

Professional ratings
Review scores
Source	Rating
AllMusic	3.5/5 stars

Truth of Touch is the fourteenth studio album by keyboardist and composer Yanni, released by Yanni/Wake label in 2011.

== Track listing ==
No.	Title	Length
1.	"Truth of Touch"	4:13
2.	"Echo of a Dream"	3:58
3.	"Seasons"	3:57
4.	"Voyage"	3:36
5.	"Flash of Color"	3:17
6.	"Vertigo"	3:28
7.	"Nine"	5:33
8.	"Can't Wait"	4:09
9.	"Guilty Pleasure"	3:48
10.	"O Luce Che Brilla Nell'oscurità"	4:04
11.	"I'm So"	4:37
12.	"Long Way Home"	3:26
13.	"Yanni & Arturo"	5:56
14.	"Mist of a Kiss"	4:29
15.	"Secret"	4:03

== Production ==
- Arranged by Yanni
- Engineered by Yanni, Silvio Richetto & Travis Meck
- Additional Arrangements by Miklos Malek on "Truth of Touch", "Seasons", "Voyage", "Flash of Color" and "Vertigo"
- Additional Production by Marc Russell & David Scheuer on "Secret"
- Mastered by Chris Bellman at Bernie Grundman Mastering, Los Angeles
- Art Direction: & Design: Norman Moore, DesignArtLA.com
- Photography: Silvio Richetto

(Production as described in CD liner notes.)

== AllMusic Review ==
Truth of Touch was Yanni's first album of new studio material since 2003's Ethnicity, with Yanni said to be "returning to his instrumental roots". In contrast to the vocal-centric of Yanni Voices (2009), Truth of Touch is a largely instrumental album, and was said to constitute a "return to form" for Yanni, referring to his mid-1990s musical style. The album was said to include cinematic elements, with smooth jazz and tribal rhythms.

== Rankings ==
- Peaked as #1 Billboard New Age album for 2011 and 2012
- Peaked as #11 Billboard Independent Album for 2011
- Was the #1 top-selling New Age album of 2011 and #10 in 2012
