= The Inspiring Journey =

Compilation album by Yanni
- Released: June 30, 2010
- Recorded: 1980–1993
- Genres: Instrumental; Easy listening
- Length: 75:02
- Label: Sony Music
- Producer: Yanni

Yanni chronology
The Essential Yanni (2010)	The Inspiring Journey (2010)	Mexicanisimo (2010)

Professional ratings
Review scores
Source	Rating
AllMusic	(?)

The Inspiring Journey is a compilation album by keyboardist and composer Yanni, released on the Sony Music label in 2010.

This is a double-disc compilation album.

== Track listing ==
Disc 1

No.	Title	Length
1.	"Aria"	4:01
2.	"To the One Who Knows"	5:39
3.	"Butterfly Dance"	6:29
4.	"Almost a Whisper"	3:12
5.	"The Rain Must Fall" (from Live at the Acropolis)	7:28
6.	"Keys to Imagination"	5:18
7.	"To Take... To Hold"	4:04
8.	"Marching Season"	4:34
9.	"You Only Live Once"	7:22
10.	"Within Attraction"	4:13
11.	"So Long My Friend"	3:50
12.	"A Word in Private"	3:52
13.	"In the Morning Light"	3:50
14.	"A Love for Life"	5:07

Disc 2

No.	Title	Length
1.	"Once Upon a Time"	3:53
2.	"First Touch"	3:04
3.	"Flight of Fantasy"	5:45
4.	"Song for Antarctica"	4:26
5.	"Reflections of Passion"	4:39
6.	"Looking Glass"	6:43
7.	"In the Mirror"	4:10
8.	"One Man's Dream"	2:49
9.	"Desire"	5:02
10.	"Felitsa"	4:56
11.	"Nice to Meet You"	5:37
12.	"Nostalgia" (from Live at the Acropolis)	5:49
13.	"Santorini" (from Live at the Acropolis)	6:59
14.	"After the Sunrise"	4:38
