= Mexican folk dance =

Folk dance

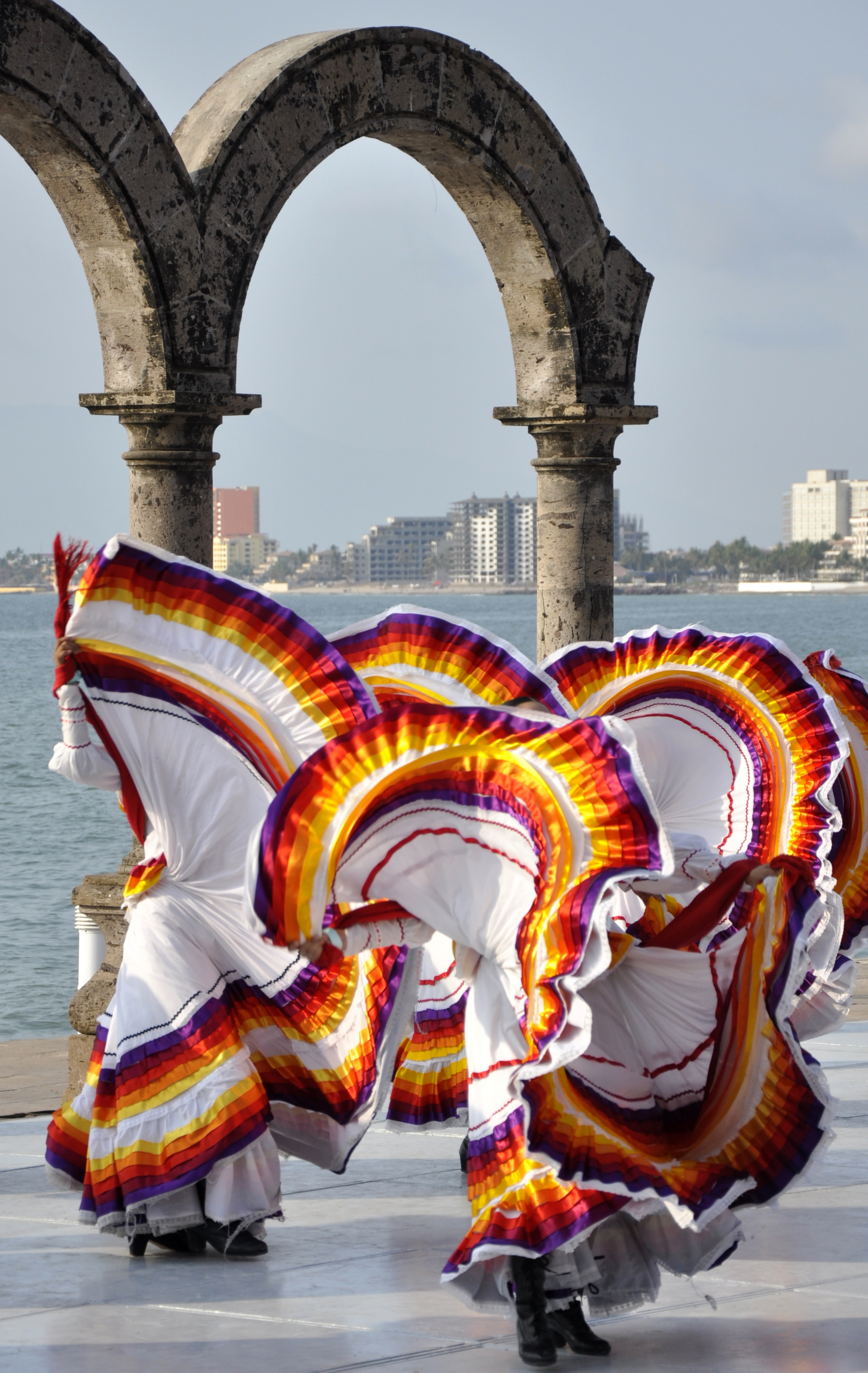
Jarabe dance performed in Puerto Vallarta

Folk dance of Mexico, commonly known as baile folklorico or Mexican ballet folk dance, is a term used to collectively describe traditional Mexican folk dances. Ballet folklórico is not just one type of dance; it encompasses each region's traditional dance that has been influenced by their local folklore and has been entwined with ballet characteristics to be made into a theatrical production. Each dance represents a different region in Mexico illustrated through their different zapateado, footwork, having differing stomps or heel toe points, and choreography that imitates animals from their region such as horses, iguanas, and vultures.

== History ==
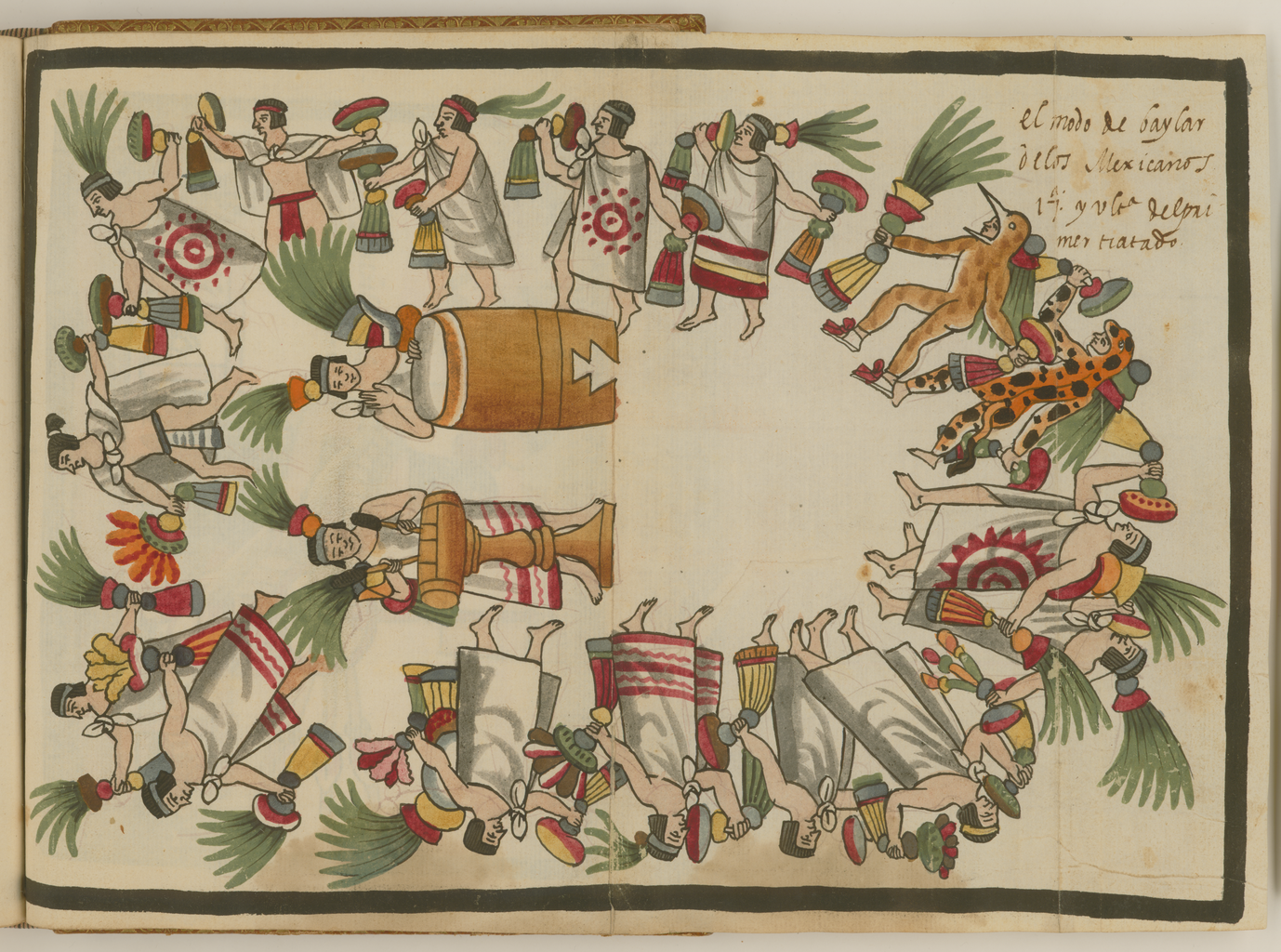
Aztec nobles dancing as depicted in the post-Conquest Tovar Codex.

Mexico's modern folk dance tradition is a blending of elements from its Indigenous, African, and European heritage. Before the arrival of the Spanish, indigenous dance developed with strong ties to the religious practices. For the Aztecs, there were two levels of dance, those for the elite, and those for the common people, such as Netotilitzli. After the Conquest, the Spanish initially worked to eradicate indigenous dances, considering them “too pagan” and succeeded with a number of forms, especially those associated with the priest and ruling classes. However, they were unable to eradicate the more popular forms, especially in the rural and more inaccessible regions of New Spain. Instead, evangelizers worked to adapt dances to Christianity, giving them new meanings. For this reason, most of these dances have suffered at least some modification since the pre Hispanic era.

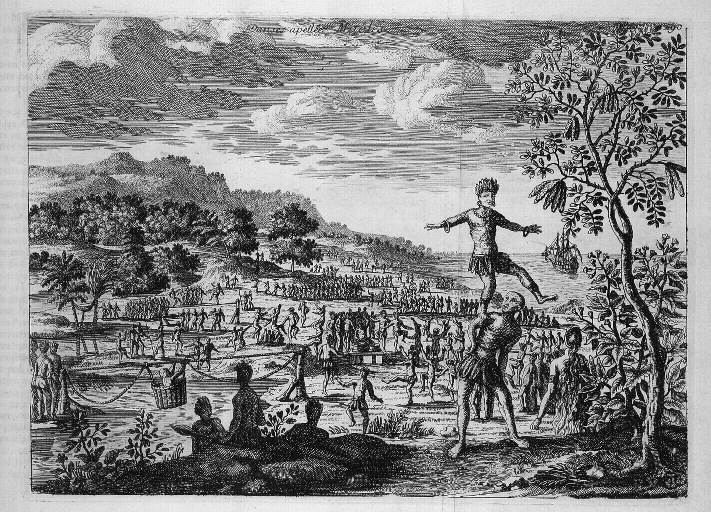
Representation of indigenous dance of the 19th century.

Dance evolved drastically from 1520 to 1750, mostly among the indigenous, African, and mestizo descendants. One of the first adaptations was allowing the indigenous to continue dances with religious aspects but in homage to the Virgin Mary or other Catholic personage. One of the first areas to begin innovation was Tlaxcala, were dances to reenact the Conquest are traced. In addition, a number of European dances, music and instruments were introduced including Moros y cristianos (a mock battle between Moors and Christians brought to the central states), Los Archos, Las Escadas, Los Machetes, El Paloteo, Las Cintas and Los Doce Pares. Other European dances include La Zambra, La Zarabanda, La Contradanza, seguidillas, fandangos, huapangos, jotas, boleros, zambras and zapateados. In some cases, these dances were modified or given entirely new choreography in Mexico. Most of the traditional dances performed today took on their forms during the colonial period but they were not firmly part of Mexican identity until after the Mexican War of Independence when it received its first surge in popularity. For example, the jarabe dance of Jalisco, became a political tool to evoke feelings of patriotism and “liberty.” In fact, this dance became intricately linked to the independence movement, causing it to be called the Jarabe Mexicano. Its popularity led to interest in other Mexican traditional dances, especially those danced to son music.

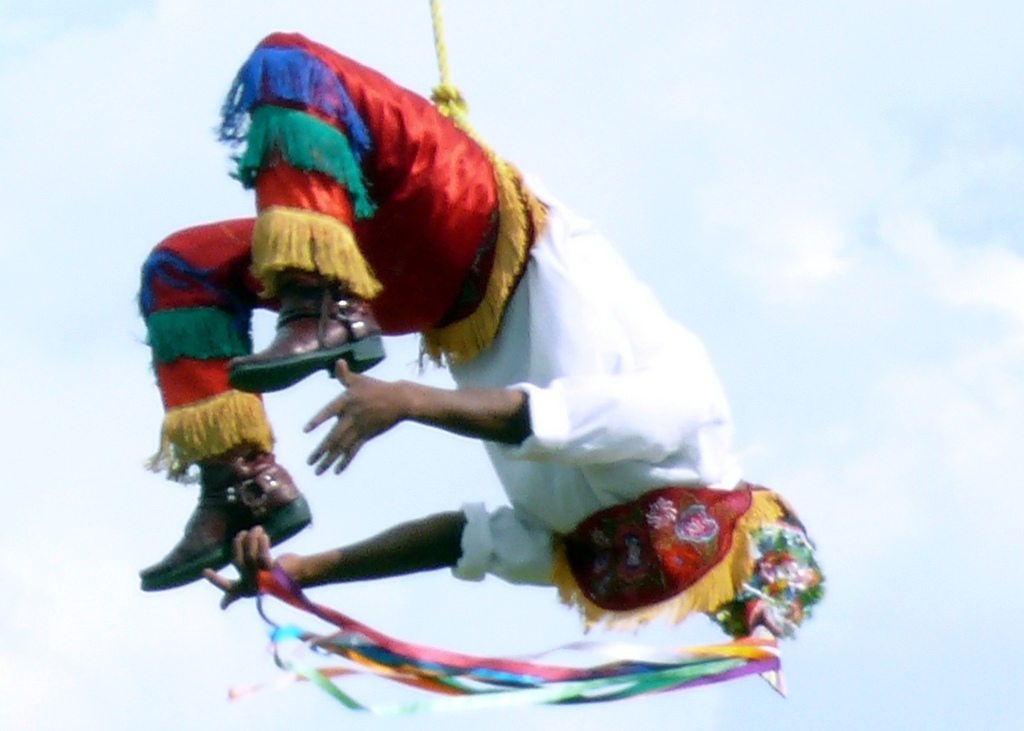
Volador

Despite modern and foreign influences in Mexico's culture in the 19th and 20th centuries, waves of nationalism have kept much of the country's folk dance tradition alive to the present day. The next wave of popularity came after the Mexican Revolution, which also created new songs in folk styles such as the still popular La Adelita, La Valentina, and La Cucaracha. The years after the Revolution also sparked interest in Mexico's indigenous heritage shifting away from the European emphasis of the Porfirian era. This was reinforced by the muralists and other artists of the 1920s and 1930s whose political aims were to forge a Mexican identity, rejecting foreign influences and politics. In the 1930s, the popularity of the dance prompted education and more formal training in it, with educational centers all over Mexico offering classes including the Departamento de Bellas Arts (Fine Arts Department) of Mexico City. Interest in folk dance declined in the 1950s and 1960s, but the Mexican government continued to subsidize it for its aesthetic and social value. This included the support of folk dance or ballet folklórico companies, the most famous of which is the Ballet Folklórico de México founded by Amalia Hernández in 1952.

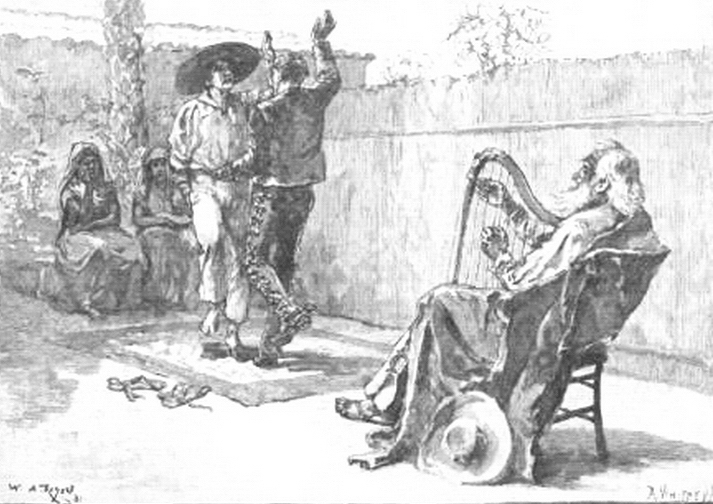
Dance as depicted in "Mexico, California and Arizona; being a new and revised edition of Old Mexico and her lost provinces" (1900).

Today, traditional Mexican folk dance is a defining element of Mexico's popular culture nationally and internationally. Preservation and promotion of dances nationally have depended on whether they are seen as part of Mexico's national identity. It is one of the few areas where indigenous practices are conserved and promoted rather than depreciated or eliminated. One reason for this is “indigenismo” the ongoing struggles of a number of indigenous communities to resist outside influences into their cultures and Mexican government efforts to assimilate them to create a homogenous national identity. Since the 1990s, these efforts have become more political in nature and have resulted in more interest in preserving pre Hispanic cultural forms. ( The government also works to preserve and promote a number of dance forms, with folk dance mandatory in public schools. In September 2011, 457 people set a Guinness record for the largest folk dance performance at the International Mariachi and Charreria Conference in Guadalajara, accompanied by over 300 mariachi musicians from Mexico, Argentina, Ecuador, Colombia and the United States.

Mexican folk dance has had an important impact on the culture of the United States, especially in Mexican American communities. This has not only included the preservation of dances that existed before the Mexican–American War in the US Southwest, but other dances, such as the Aztecas or Concheros, dance have migrated north since the 1970s.

== Diversity ==
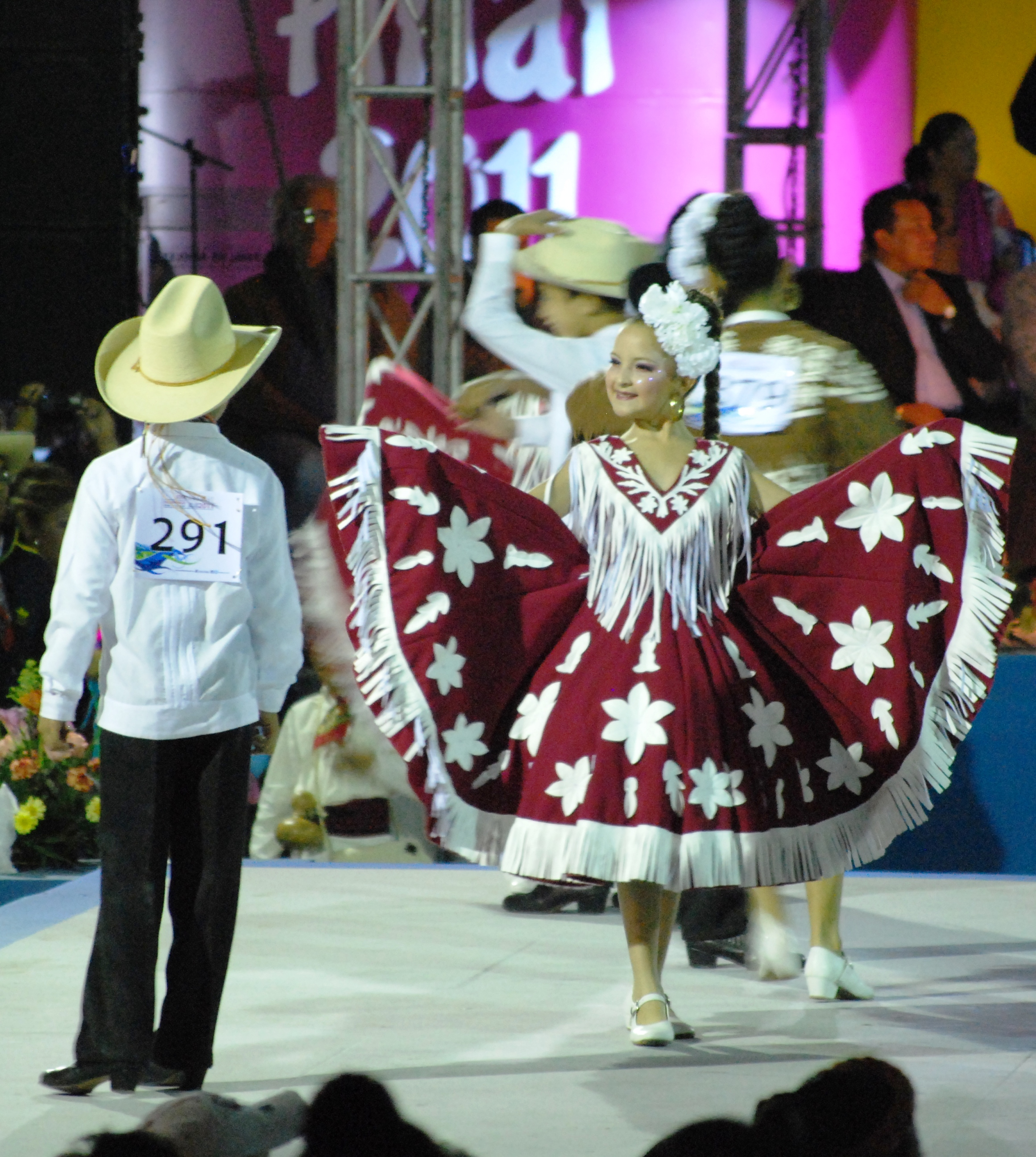
Huapango dance

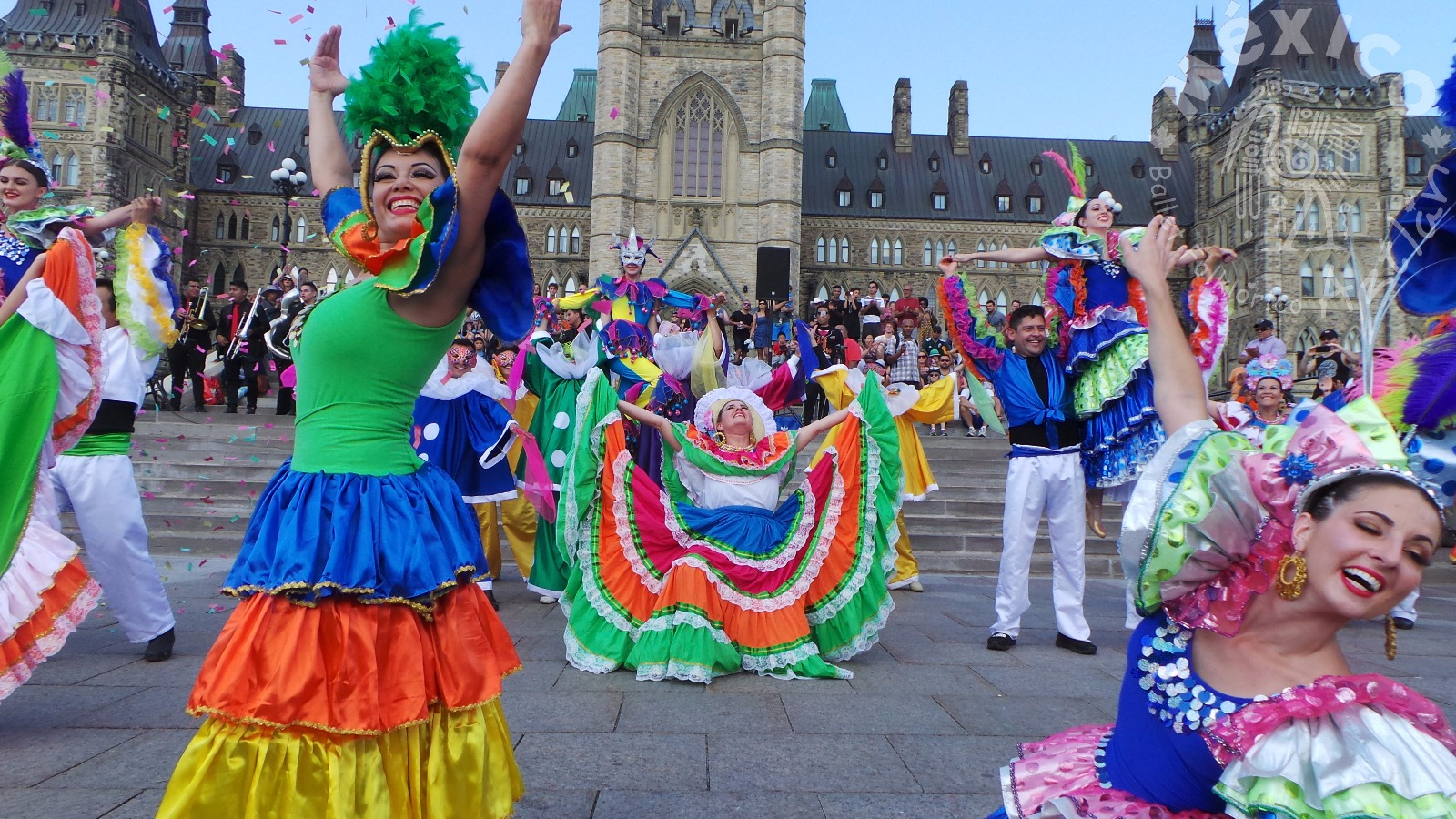
Sinaloa Carnival of the Ballet Aztlan in Ottawa, Canada.

Mexican folk dance is an uneven synthesis of different cultural traditions. Its historical roots is the synthesis of indigenous, European and African cultural influences but it continues to evolves with influences from modern pop culture. It is not one particular style but rather a collection of various regional and ethnic traditions. Dance traditions vary widely over Mexico's expanse. In some areas, such as the Isthmus of Tehuantepec and the Yucatan Peninsula, the pre Hispanic elements have almost completely disappeared. In others, such as Totonacapan (in the states of Veracruz and Puebla), among the Nahuas of Guerrero and State of Mexico, the Huastecs of San Luis Potosí and areas in the northwest of the country, indigenous elements have been strongly maintained. Those considered native or indigenous include Los Voladores, Los Quetzales, and the Deer Dance. Dances that survive relatively intact are in areas that were remote from colonial authorities. However, their “purity” is under debate.

Most of the ancient dances have been modified in various ways, although most of these are superficial with the basic movements remaining intact from the pre Hispanic period. The aspect to change most has been costuming. The materials used to produce dance costumes, adapting to new materials and the loss of old ones. The use of hides and feathers is the oldest of costuming traditions, but today costumes can be made of synthetic fabrics and other modern elements. One common substitution is the use of mirrors on costumes to replace polished stones.

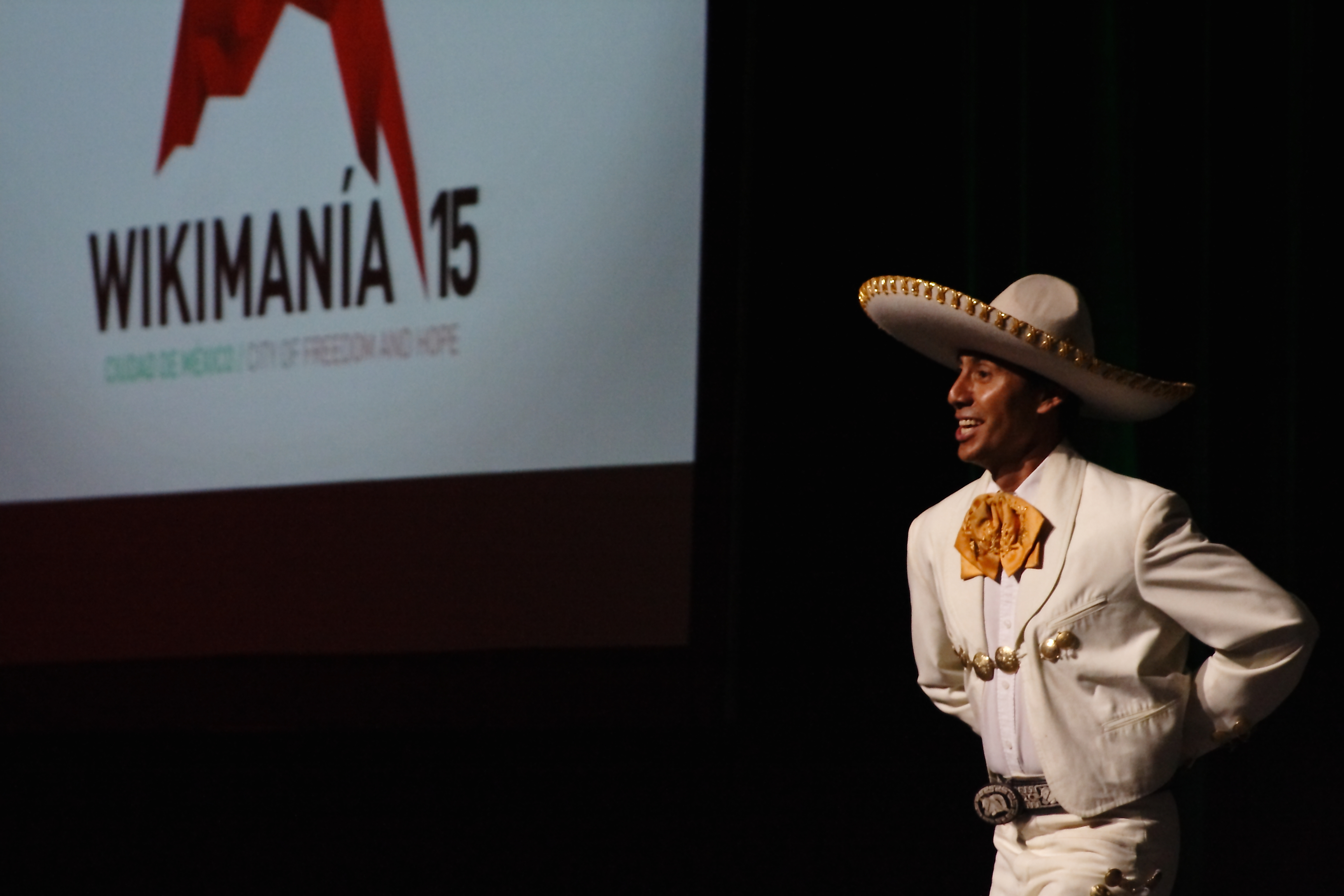
Jalisco jarabe

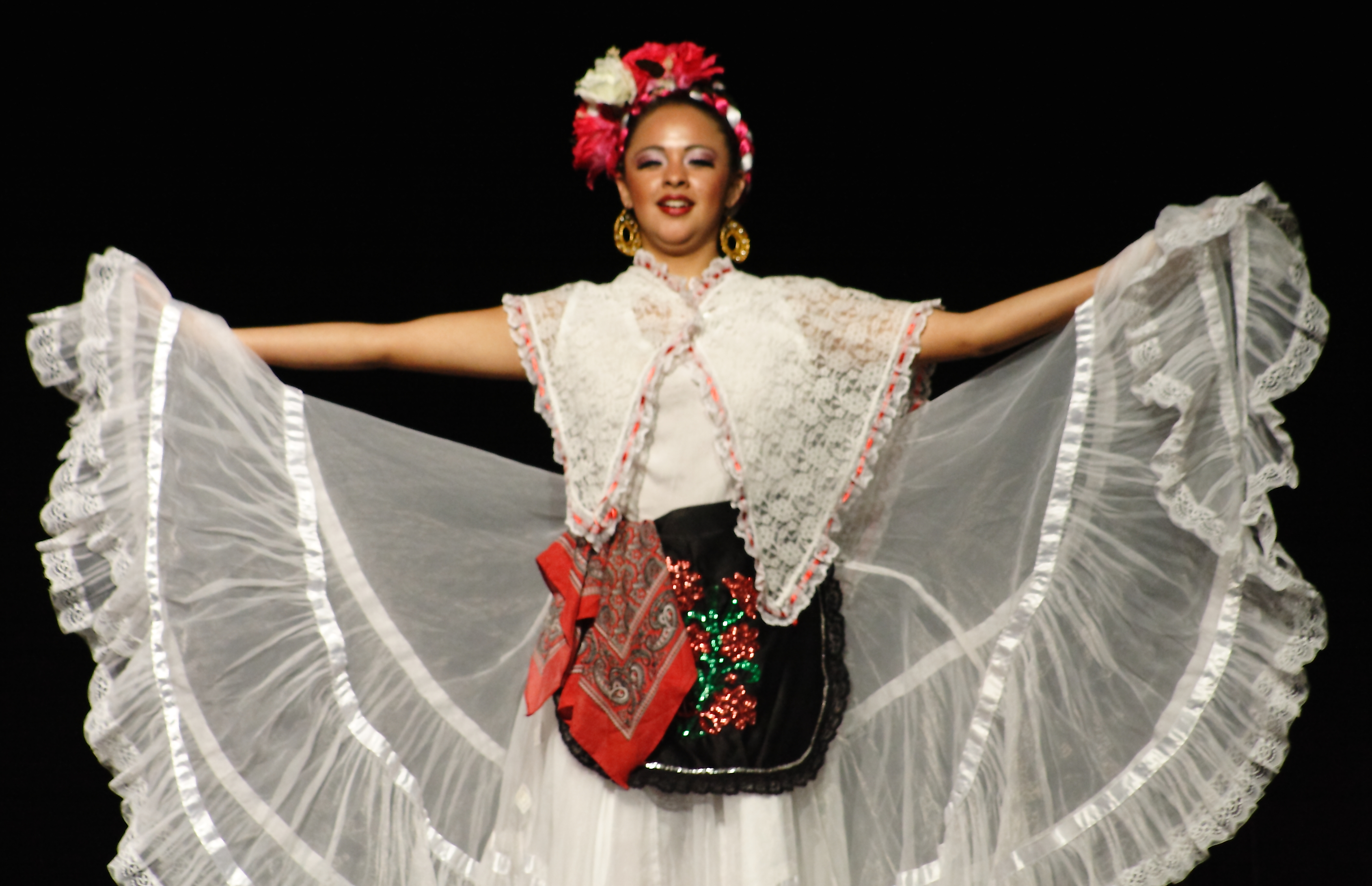
Woman doing typical dance of the state of Veracruz, Mexico.

Instruments used to accompany the dancers have changed to include those from Europe, but pre Hispanic ones, especially drums and flutes, are still used. However, as many dances are still tied to religious events, knowing how to play the traditional songs and dance the traditional dances still gives dancers and musicians social stature, as they are keepers of tradition and expected to pass it along to the next generation.

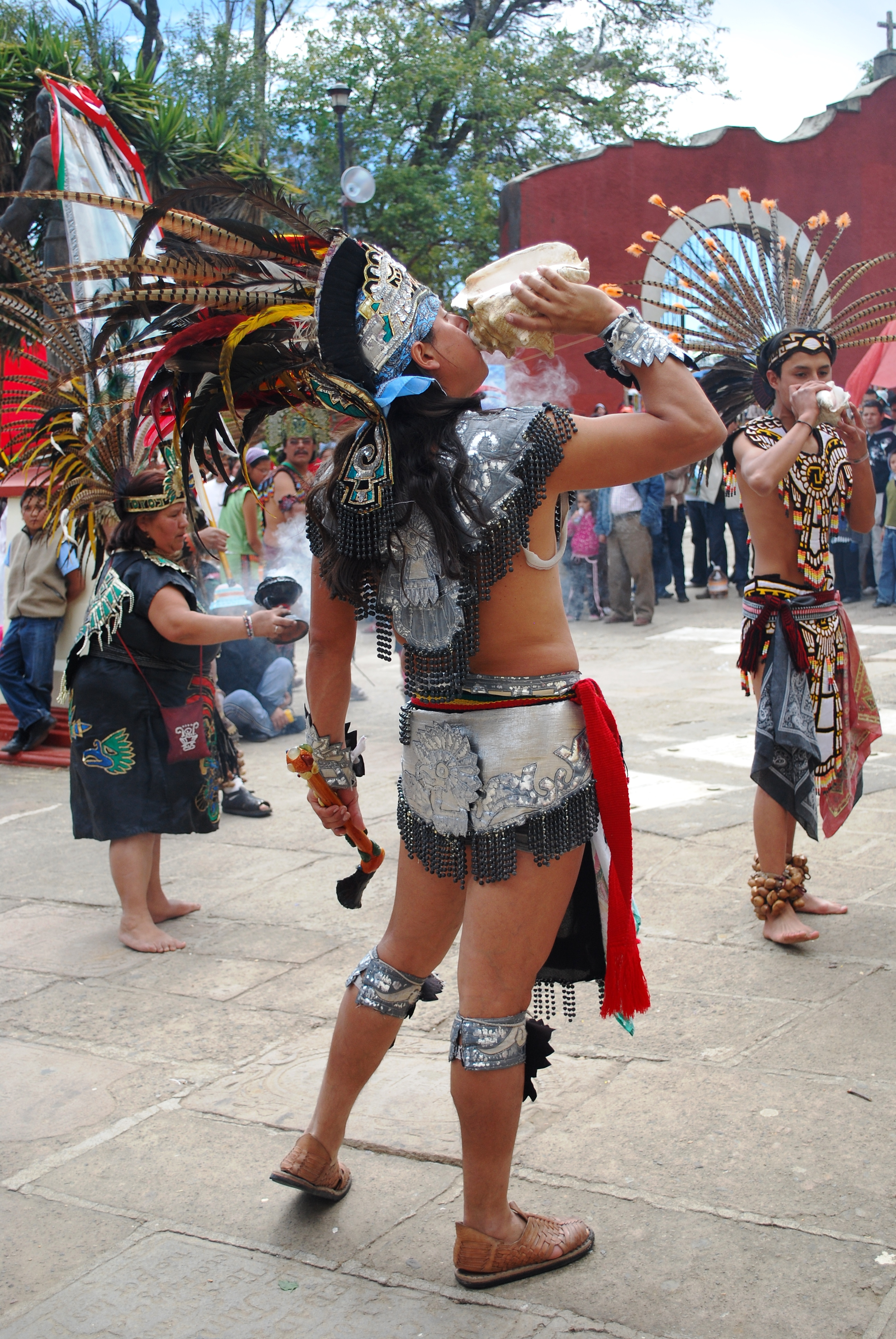
Conchero dance blowing conch shell in Amecameca.

Traditional dance generally involves the history and/or the cosmology of the people who perform it, and is a part of the social cohesion of that group. While varying widely, many folk dances in Mexico share some common elements. Animals that appear in these dances are generally those that were religiously significant to pre-Hispanic indigenous people. These animals include deer, serpents, eagles, and jaguars. After the Conquest, dancers added other animals—such as horses, bulls, and roosters. Masks are used in various ways in Mexican dance. They can be used to “transform” the dancer into a character, either metaphorically or religiously, it can be used to hide the dancer's identity for festivals such as Carnival to allow for pranks and/or it can be used for social commentary, for example a farmer wearing a mask and military-style clothing to protest corrupt police. The use of mirrors on costumes are to represent the life force of the sun as its light is reflected as the dancers move. In the carnival dances of the Nahuas in Veracruz, scholars have documented cross-dressing as an important aspect of these ritual dances.

Most Mexican traditional dance shows indigenous and/or European heritage, but there are some that show the country's African past, especially in Veracruz and the Costa Chica region in Guerrero and Oaxaca. Like indigenous dances, African based ones often involved the use of masks, costumes and other props that carry various meanings with the dances themselves function as a form of social cohesion. In Veracruz, best known “African” dances include Los Negritos, along with various huapangos and sons. In the Costa Chica, the best known of these dances include Los Diablos, Las Tortugas and Toro de Petate.

Generally, folk dance is popular and well supported by various government efforts, but not all to the same extent. Those considered representative of the country and popular outside their home region, such as the jarocho or jarabe receive regional and federal support. Those without that type of popularity are performed mostly in local and regional religious events. While much support is geared to preserving dance forms, art forms outside of Mexico still have influence. Traditional dance is taught alongside more modern dance such as salsa, merengue and hip hop in various schools and cultural centers across the country with some crossover effect.

== Ballet Folklórico de México ==
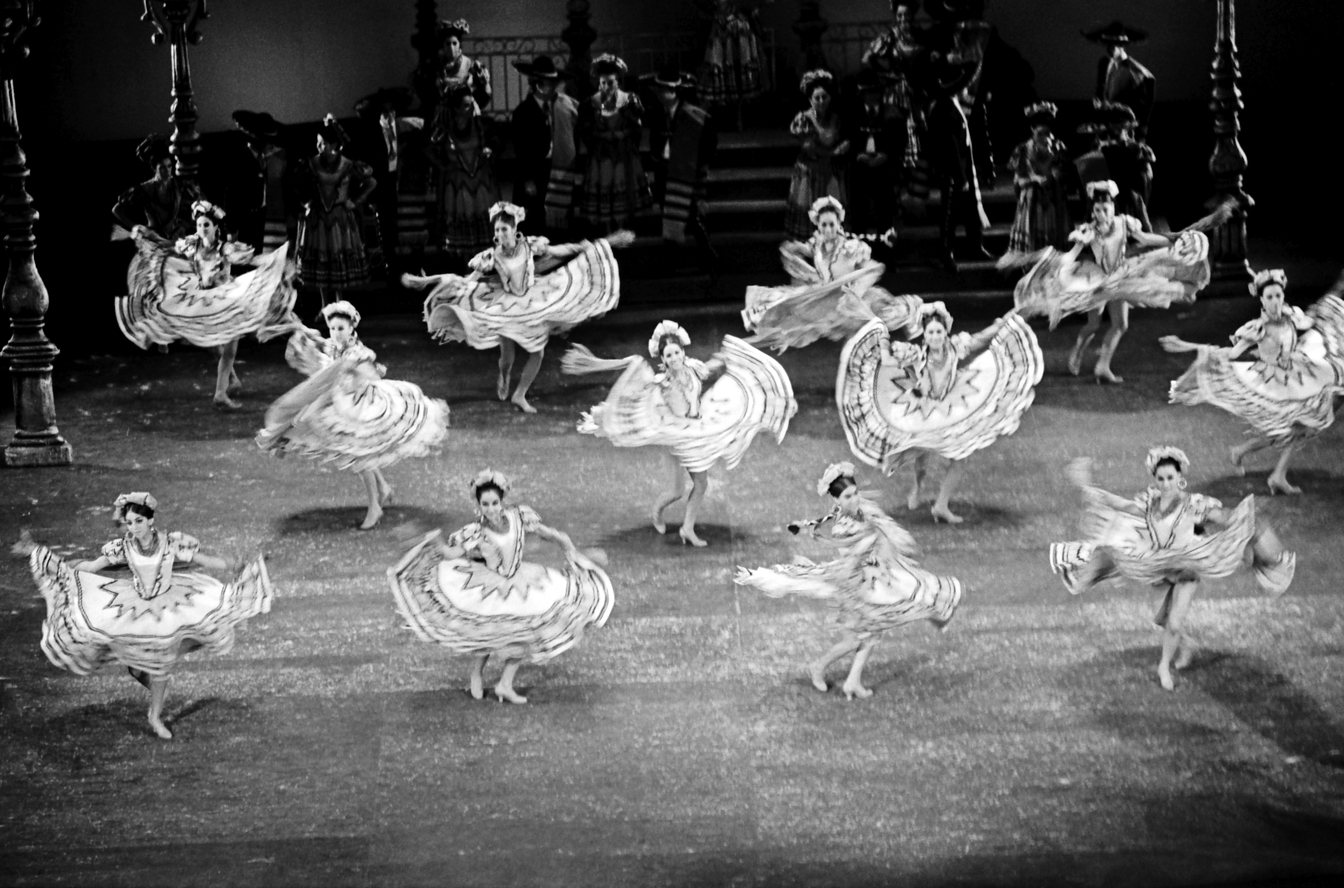
Ballet Folkorico de Mexico 1970.

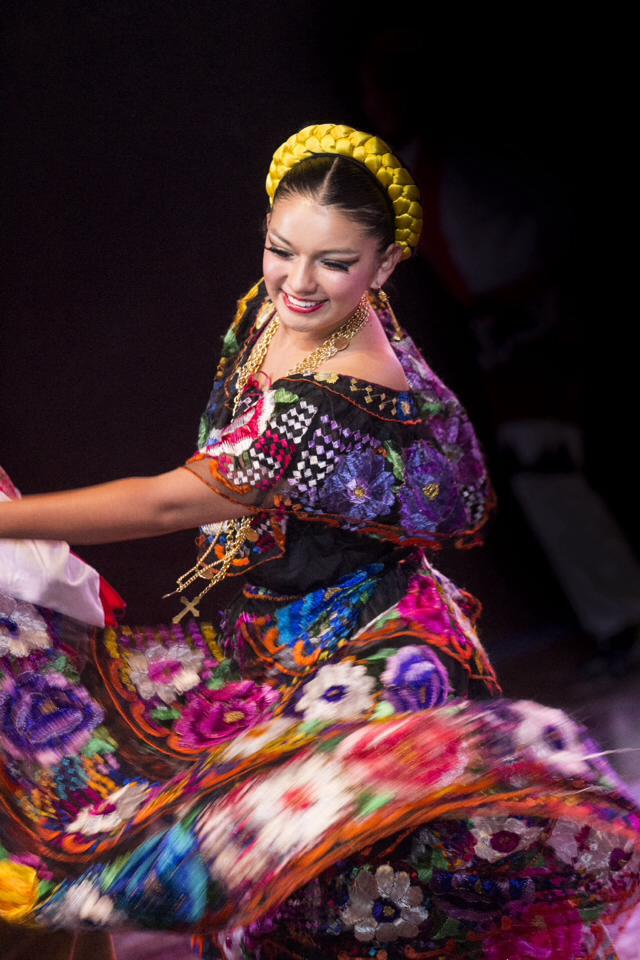
Typical Mexican dance. Representation in Culture Week.

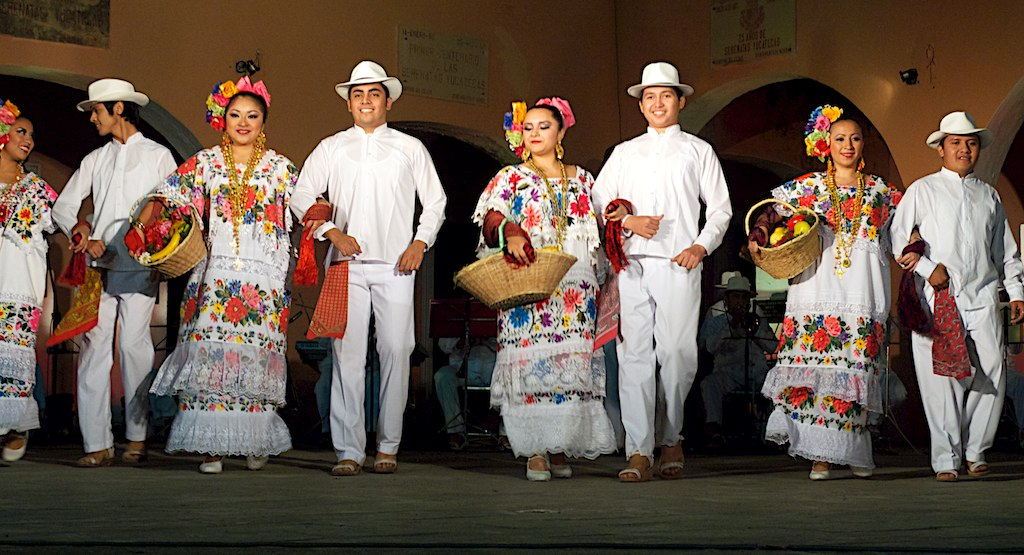
Jarana yucateca

Mexico's best known folk dance troupe is the Ballet Folklórico de México, which was founded by dancer Amalia Hernández in 1952. The troupe consists of forty dancers, a mariachi band and sixteen other musicians. Counting support staff such as costume and set designers, the organization involves over 600 people. The group began with eight dancers with sporadic performances until they were invited to perform on television for a program called Función de Gala. Since 1959, it has performed regularly at the Palacio de Bellas Artes in Mexico City. In 1970 was named the official folk dance company of Mexico.

Amalia Hernández was a pioneer in ballet folklórico, she experimented with traditional Mexican dances that were originally created for religious purposes. Hernandez infused Mexican folk legends with ballet influences such as pointed toes, exaggerated movements, and highly choreographed routines. Hernandez was able to shift the dances from their original religious purposes, not meant to be watched, into the theatrical production that ballet folklórico is known for today. Hernandez has become a cultural ambassador for Mexico through her work with the dance troupe, choreographing more than forty different ballets covering sixty regions of Mexico. It wasn't until her death in 2000 at the age of 84, that the troupe gained a new director her grandson Salvador López. The repertoire maintains the traditional dances although somewhat updated with the choreography of López. Dances include the Jarabe tapatío, the Deer Dance and the Aztecs/Concheros. It also has “new” dances such as Adelitas, which honors the women of the Mexican Revolution. The group has performed over 15,000 times in sixty counties and 300 cities in Europe, Asia and Latin America. It has an average of 250 performances per year.

== Dances in Central Mexico ==
=== Querétaro ===
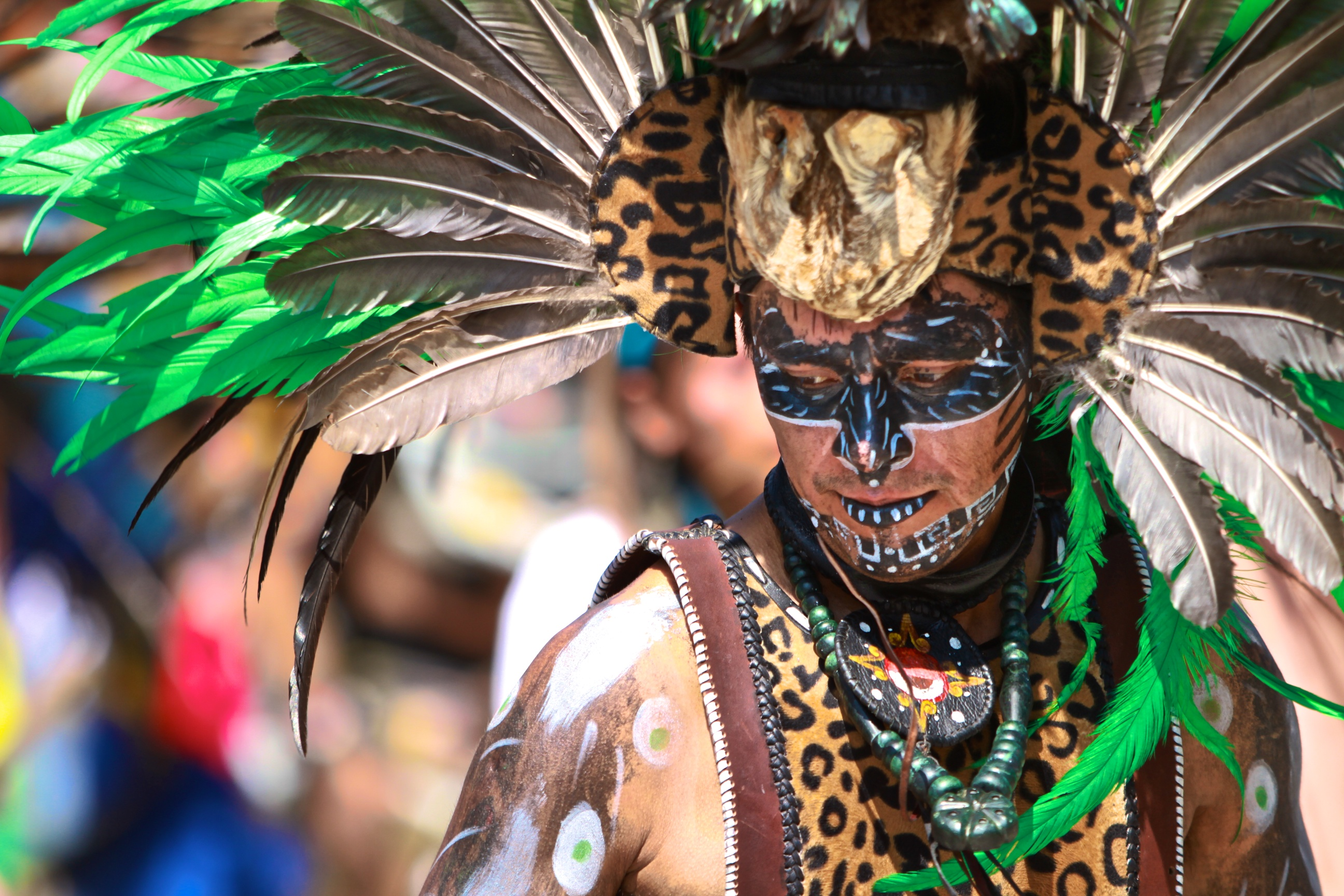
Concheros dancer in Ixcateopan de Cuauhtémoc.

The Concheros dance is also known as Apaches, Indios and Chichimecas. It is a ritual dance that likely developed after 1522 as a means of preserving some elements of pre Hispanic culture. Members of these dance troupes are part of formal societies and unlike some other groups admit women. These troupes perform at annual festival mostly in honor of patron saints—especially in the Villa de Guadalupe, Amecameca, Chalma and Los Remedios. These are located north, east, south, and west of Mexico City, a remnant of the importance of the cardinal directions to indigenous people. Dancers dress in indigenous style garb that can include loincloths, feathered headdresses body paint and more. They are accompanied by indigenous drums, flutes and small lutes made from armadillo shells (showing European influence). The symbolism and most of the steps are indigenous.

=== Mexico City ===
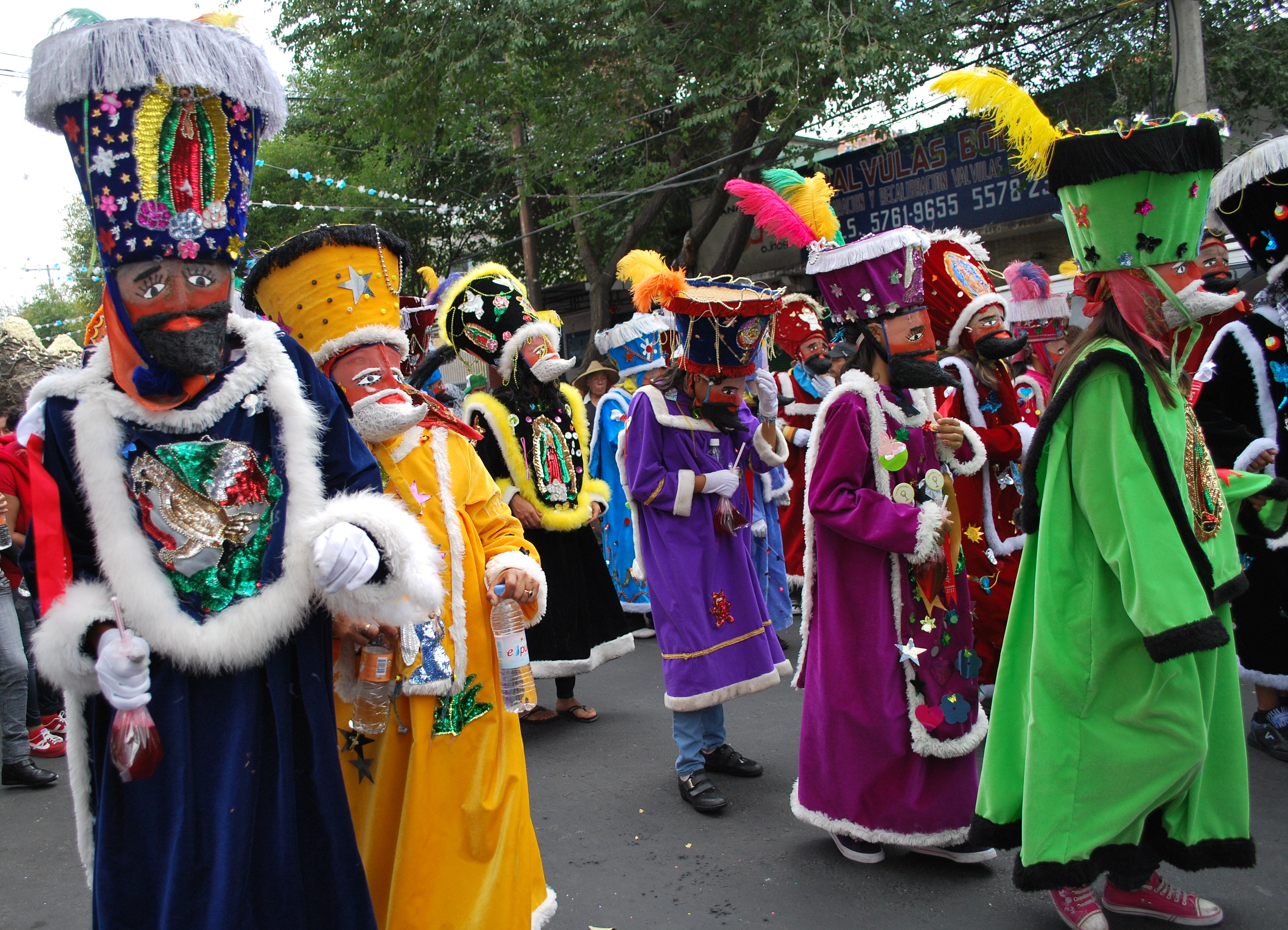
Chinelos in Colonia Doctores, Mexico City

The Chinelos dance is derived from Carnival celebrations in what are now the south of Mexico City, Morelos and the State of Mexico. Since Carnival celebrations allow the wearing of masks for anonymity and behaviors not normally tolerated, a tradition arose for the indigenous to make fun of the Spanish elite and their dress through the dance. The word “chinelos” is derived from the Nahuatl word zineloquie, which means “disguised.” Chinelos dancers wear masks imitating the fair skin and beards of the Spanish along with elaborate dress and gloves. They are the best known Carnival dancers in Mexico with Morelos have the most groups. The Chinelo dancers are now a symbol of the state of Morelos, with the tradition increasing with more towns having dance troupes and it is possible to see troupes dancing at times other than Carnival. It is even possible to hire Chinelos dancers for special occasions.

The Danza de los Quetzales is performed in Puebla. The Huehues dance is performed by the Totonaca and is similar to the Quetzales dance. The headdress is smaller and less ostentatious.

The Ocho Vicios (Eight Vices) involves a number of dancers who represent the eight vices as well as an angel, a devil, a doctor and a priest. It involves a number of movements and spoken text. It is similar to a dance called the Siete Pecados (Seven Sins). Danza de los Tres Poderes (Dance of the Three Powers) is a moral tale similar to Siete pecados and Ocho vicios, which was introduced by the evangelizers to the indigenous. The main protagonists are the Archangel Michael, the Devil and a personification of death.

Segadores contains a number of characters, which includes the “captain” who pays his workers with money from the Mexican Revolution called “bilimbiques,” workers who become lazy and a woman who tends a store but in reality is a man. This dance is performed in some small communities in the State of Mexico.

=== Puebla ===
Acatlaxquis is an Otomi dance with pre Hispanic origins but uses a pan-style flute for accompaniment. The dancers form and arch with sugar cane stalks forming a kind of cupola. This dance is most often performed in the Pahuatlán municipality, along with the Voladores. The Danza de los Arcos is done by men who carry large arches decorated with paper flowers and dance in rows. Their costumes are white with colorful sashes across the chest. It is mostly performed in Hidalgo, State of Mexico and Puebla.

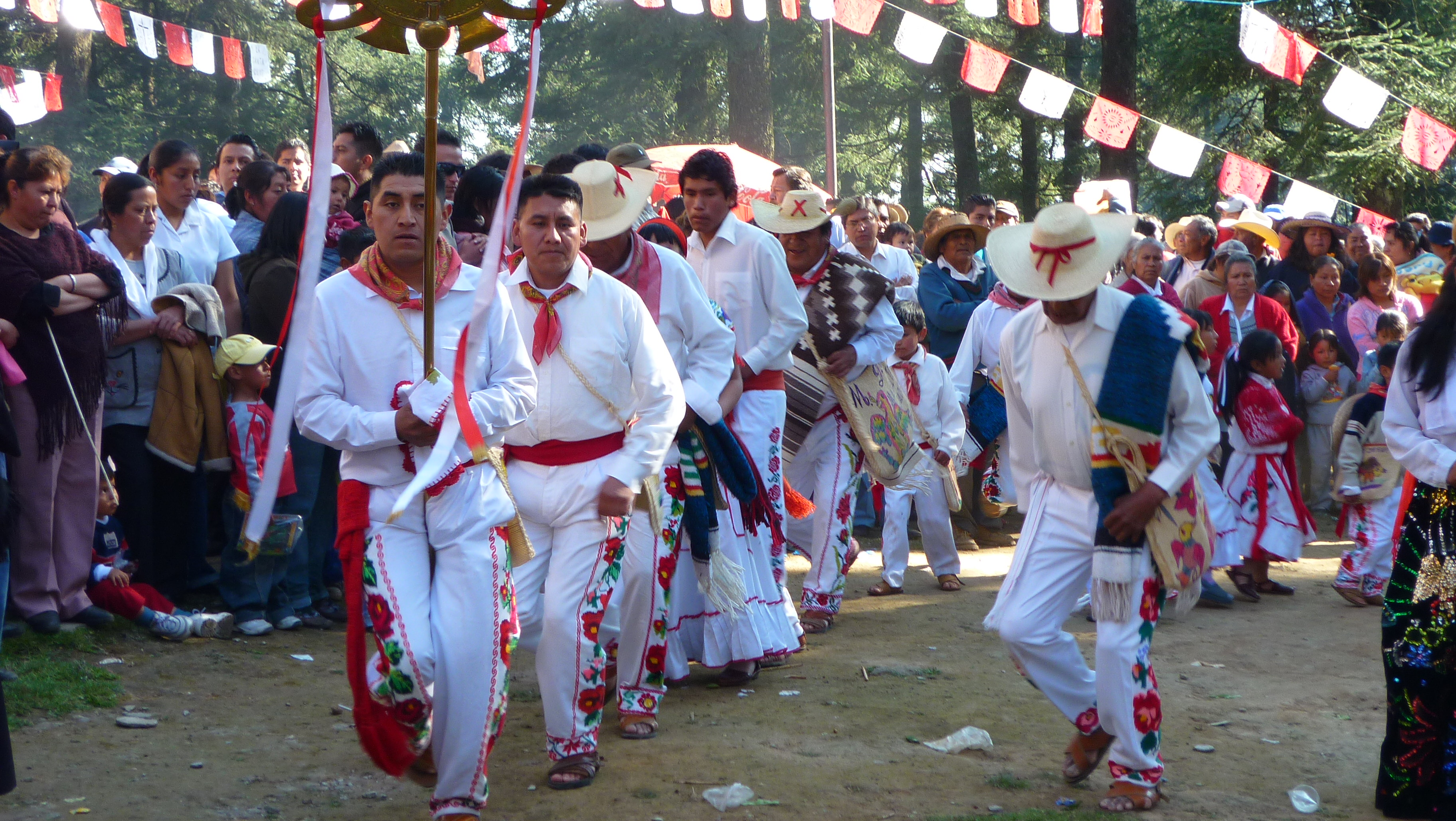
Arrieros dancers

Arrieros dancers wear white costumes, sometimes with leather chaps, and ride decoratively dressed donkeys. The dance proceeds as a procession and usually ends at a feast, which is central to the festival, with each arriero bringing a dish to share.

Caporales is a dance with men dressed as charros and used a small wooden bull.

Huehuenches or Huehues is a dance whose name is derived from the god Huehueteotl, the god of old age and of the New Fire. A better known similar dance is called the Dance of the Viejitos.

Negritos is danced in the Totonacapan region in Veracruz and Puebla. The Danza de los Quetzales is performed in Puebla. The Huehues dance is performed by the Totonaca and is similar to the Quetzales dance. The headdress is smaller and less ostentatious.

== Dances in Northern Mexico ==
=== Zacatecas ===
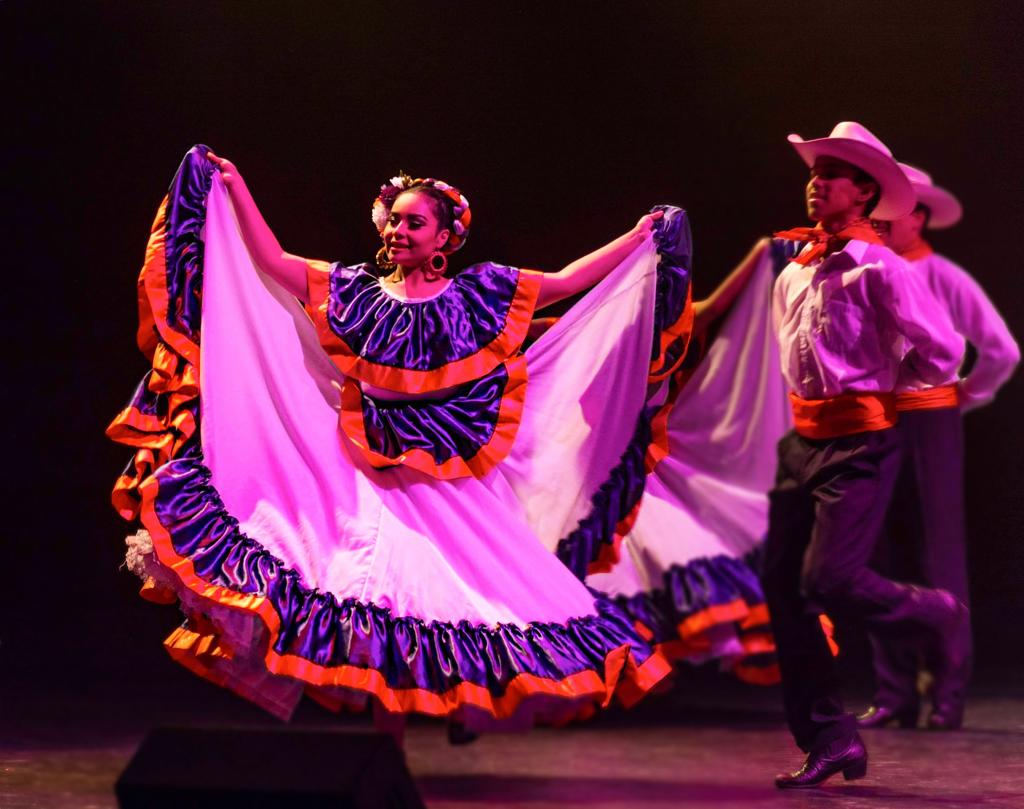
Performance of a representative dance of the Mexican State of Sinaloa. Performed by members of the Ballet Folklórico Aztlán at the Shenkman Arts Centre in Ottawa, Ontario, Canada.

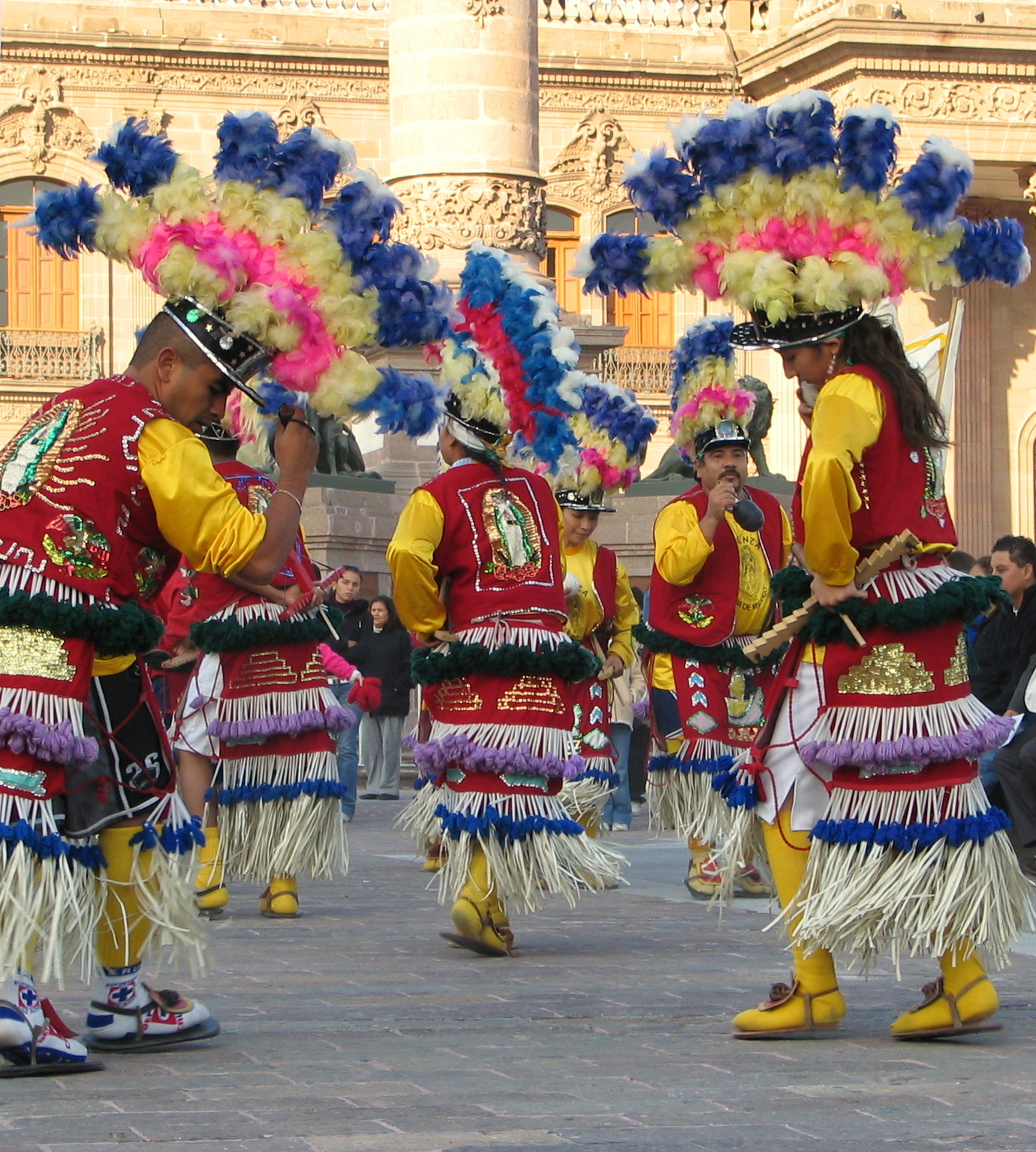
Matachines performance

Matachines is mostly performed in the states of Zacatecas and Aguascalientes but it is popular in various parts of the country, especially in the north. It consists of dancers in distinctive dress that includes brightly colored skirts, long tunics and feathered headdresses. The tunics were originally made with deerskin but today they are made with rayon but maintain the traditional arrow pattern decoration. The headdresses are made with colored chicken feathers that are often the three colors of the Mexican flag: green, white and red.

The headdress also often has a brain made with human or horse hair and fringe in the front that partially covers the faces of the dancers. The dancers wear sandals with wood soles to make more noise when they stomp. The dancers carry rattles on one hand and bows in the other, reminiscent of hunting. Another common adornment is a small mirror, usually over the arm.

Pascolas dancers wear white shirts and pants and a red handkerchief called a paliacate either around the neck or partially covering the face. A ribbon tied around the head with streamers or ribbons hanging from the back of the head to the waist. The calves of the dancers are covered in shells that rattles as he dance. They carry small metal pieces in their hands which they bang rhythmically along to music played on harps and violins. Other dances in the north include Caballitos, Chicaleros and Danza de Palma in Nuevo León, Tsacan Son in San Luis Potosí and Los Pardos in Zacatecas.

=== Sonora ===
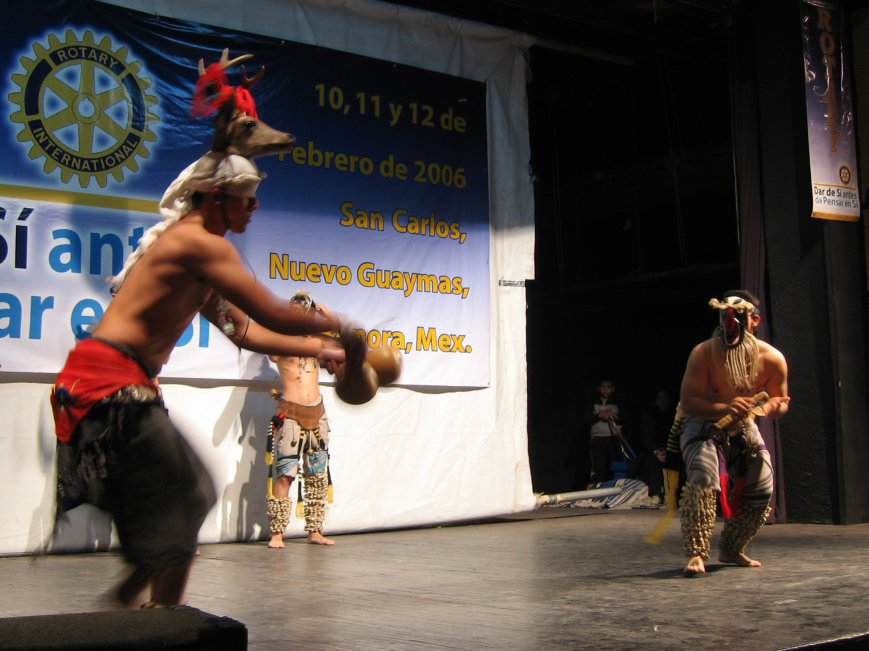
Deer Dance

Danza del Venado (Deer Dance) is performed in Sonora and Sinaloa and in the very far south of Arizona by the Yaquis and Mayos . The Yaqui Indians harness a deer in the dance to pay tribute to the deer's enduring spirit after it has been hunted, illustrated by the deer's struggle against the hunters. This dance is most associated with these peoples’ Lent and Easter celebrations, when indigenous beliefs mixed with the Catholicism introduced in the 17th and 18th centuries. The dance is part of ceremonies aimed at the renewal of the world in spring. Originally the dance was performed the night before hunting to ensure success, but today it is a means to communicate with other worlds. The deer dancer wears a shawl wrapped as a skirt with a belt traditionally made of deer hooves. He carries a gourd in each hand and ties rattles to his ankles. A real or imitation deer head is fastened to his head. Red ribbons wind around the horns to represent flowers.

== Dances in Southern Mexico ==
=== Chiapas ===
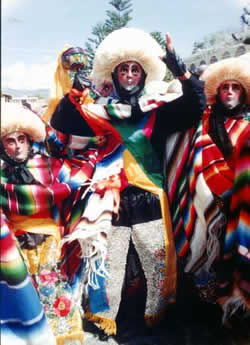
Parachicos

The dance of the Parachicos is the “Great Feast” in January each year in Chiapa de Corzo, Chiapas. For several weeks, these dances take to the streets each day to honor a number of Catholic saints, especially Saint Sebastian. The dancers wear carved wooden masks, with a headdress made of ixtle, a serape, embroidered shawl and multicolored ribbons, carrying maracas. They are led by a “patron) who carries a guitar and a whip, and plays the flute; while the drummers provide rhythm. The dance has been named an Intangible Cultural Heritage of Humanity . Cochino (pig) is named after a pig's head which is decorated and carried as part of the event. The head is decorated with flowers and rolls of colored paper, paper birds, rag dolls, and candies. The mouth holds a roll with the name of the person who well receive the head. The head is carried on a large, decorated platter by women who dance and smack their lips to indicate how delicious the animal is.

=== Veracruz ===
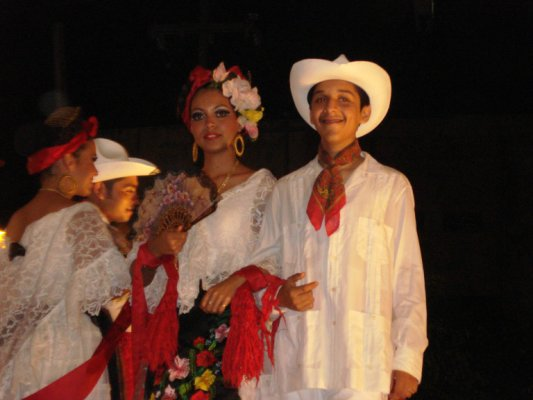
Fandango jarocho

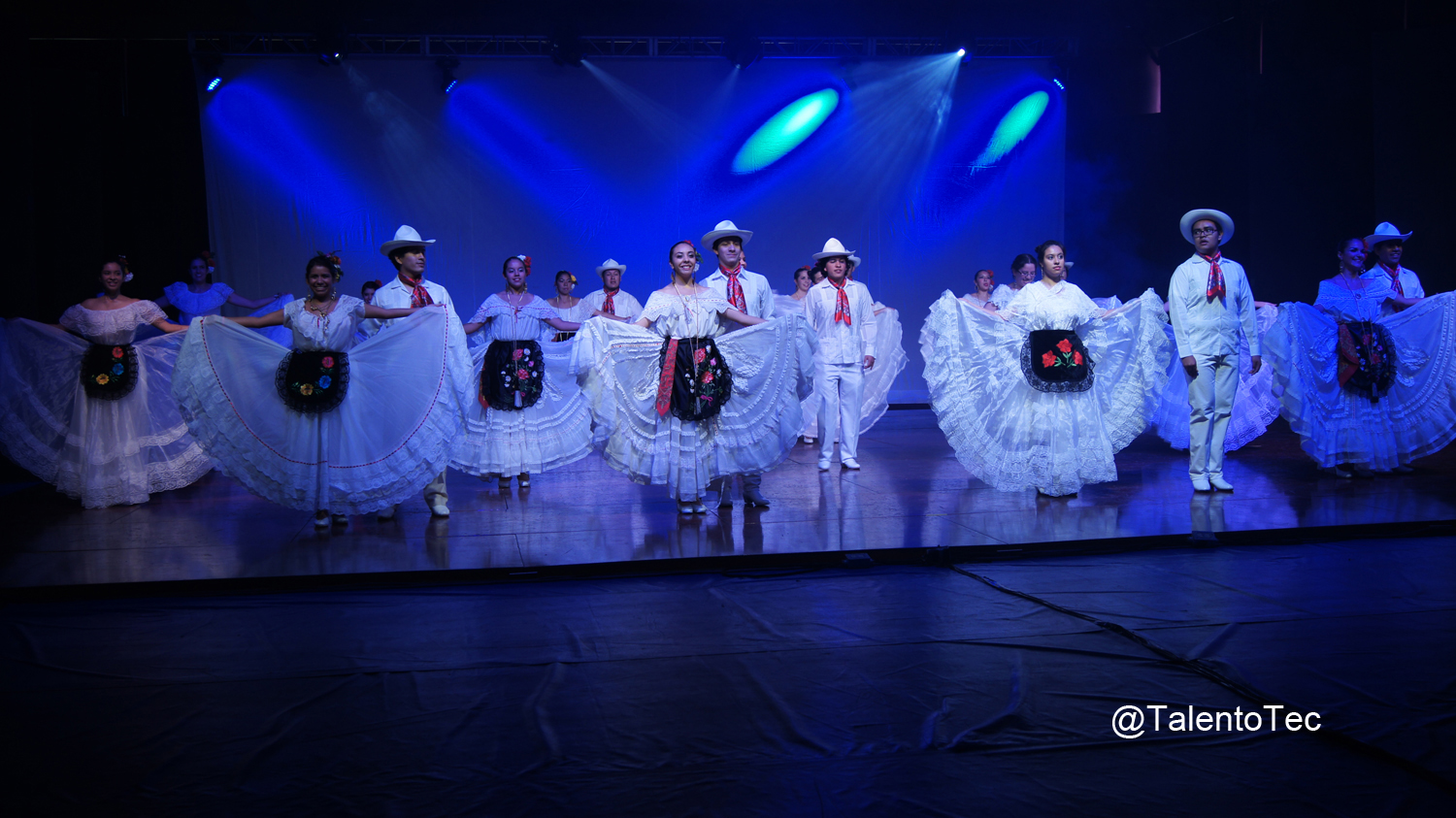
Veracruz Dance performed at the Monterrey Institute of Technology, Mexico City Campus.

Danza de los Voladores, Dance of the Flyers, is a dance/ceremony/ritual still performed in Mexico today, best known in the Totonicapán area of northern Veracruz and northern Puebla states. It is believed to have originated with the Nahua, Huastec and Otomi peoples in central Mexico, and then spread throughout most of Mesoamerica. The ritual consists of dance and the climbing of a 30-meter pole from which four of the five participants then launch themselves tied with ropes to descend to the ground. The fifth remains on top of the pole, dancing and playing a flute and drum. The ceremony was named an Intangible Cultural Heritage by UNESCO in order to help the ritual survive in the modern world. Veracruz region has influenced their folkloric dance by instilling the musical instruments that originated from the region into the performances like cunjunto jaracho (jarocho ensemble), requito (a guitar-like instrument), pandero (tambourine), and quijada (jawbone of donkey for percussion). As well as having the choreography be influenced by Veracruz animals in the region imitating the moves of iguanas. The costumes reflect the environment of Veracruz illustrated by the performers wearing lacy skirts and blouse to represent the state's humid tropical weather.

== Dances in Western Mexico ==
=== Jalisco ===
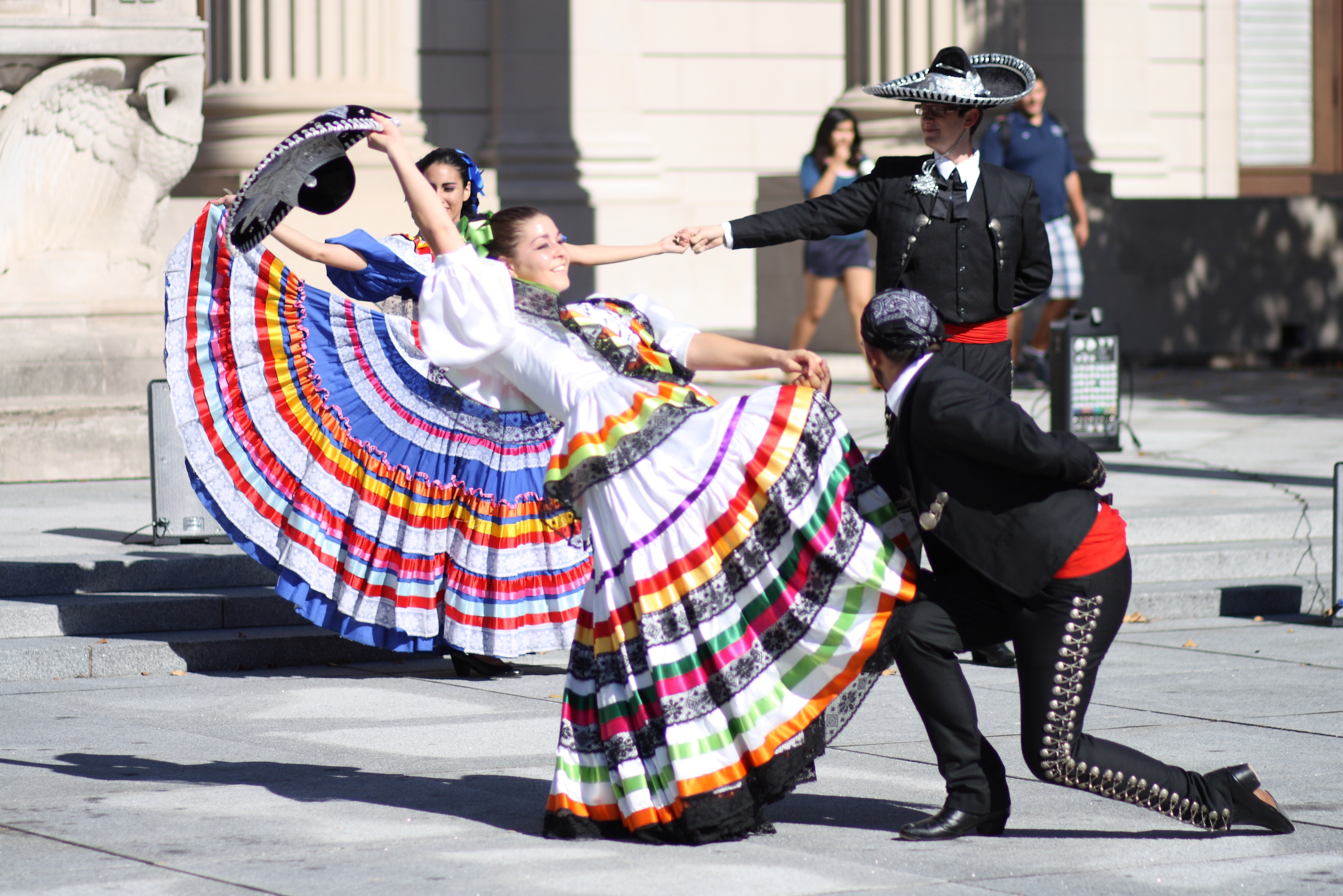
Jarabe dancers

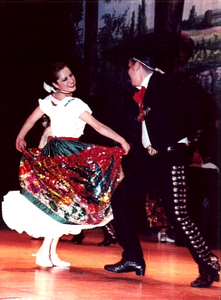
Jarabe Tapatío in the traditional China Poblana dress.

The Jarabe is considered Mexico's “national dance” and is the best known outside the country, often called the “Mexican Hat Dance” in English. The dance was performed for the first time formally in 1860 at the Coliseo Theater in Mexico City. During the 1860s it was fashionable in high society. The dance symbolizes the courtship of a woman by a man, who at first is refused but accepted in the end. The two protagonists are usually a man in a charro suit and a woman in a “China Poblana” outfit. It was popularized internationally in the 20th century by Russian dancer Anna Pavlova who visited Mexico in 1919. She made the dance part of her permanent repertoire. The dance's current form emerged nationally during the Mexican Revolution although various “jarabe” dances existed before this time, such as the Jarabe Jalisco, the Jarabe Atole and Jarabe Moreliana. The charros outfit is from Mexico's cowboy tradition and the China Poblana outfit is based on the dress of an Asian woman who became famous in the city of Puebla in the colonial period. Today, this dress, especially the skirt, is heavily decorated with patriotic themes. The Jarabe is danced to Mariachi music and is performed at Mexican national holidays such as Las Fiestas Patrias, Cinco de Mayo, and El Dieciséis de Septiembre.

Paixtles is one of the few pre Hispanic dances to remain free from European influence, mostly performed in Jalisco and Nayarit. Participants cover themselves with the moss that hangs from Montezuma Cypress trees and carry staves which have the head of a deer at one end. They accompany themselves with maracas that they carry. Dancers wear masks to cover the face and ribbons that hang from the head.

Other important dances include La Judea, danced by the Coras during Holy Week in Nayarit, Sonajeros, danced in the south of Jalisco, and the Dance of the Cúrpites.

=== Guerrero ===
Many notable dances are found in the state of Guerrero. The three most common dances of the coast of Oaxaca and Guerrero are the Devil Dance, the Turtle Dance and the Toro de Petate (Straw Bull Dance), all of which are tied to the area's Afro-Mexican communities. The first three contains characteristics which are found only in this region and nowhere else in Mexico and include violence and even sexual overtures. The main characters, devils, turtles and bulls represented by those in masks, are mythical creatures which dance in the streets alongside humans who either challenge or subdue them. Other important Afro-Mexican dances include the Tiger Dance and the Tejorones.

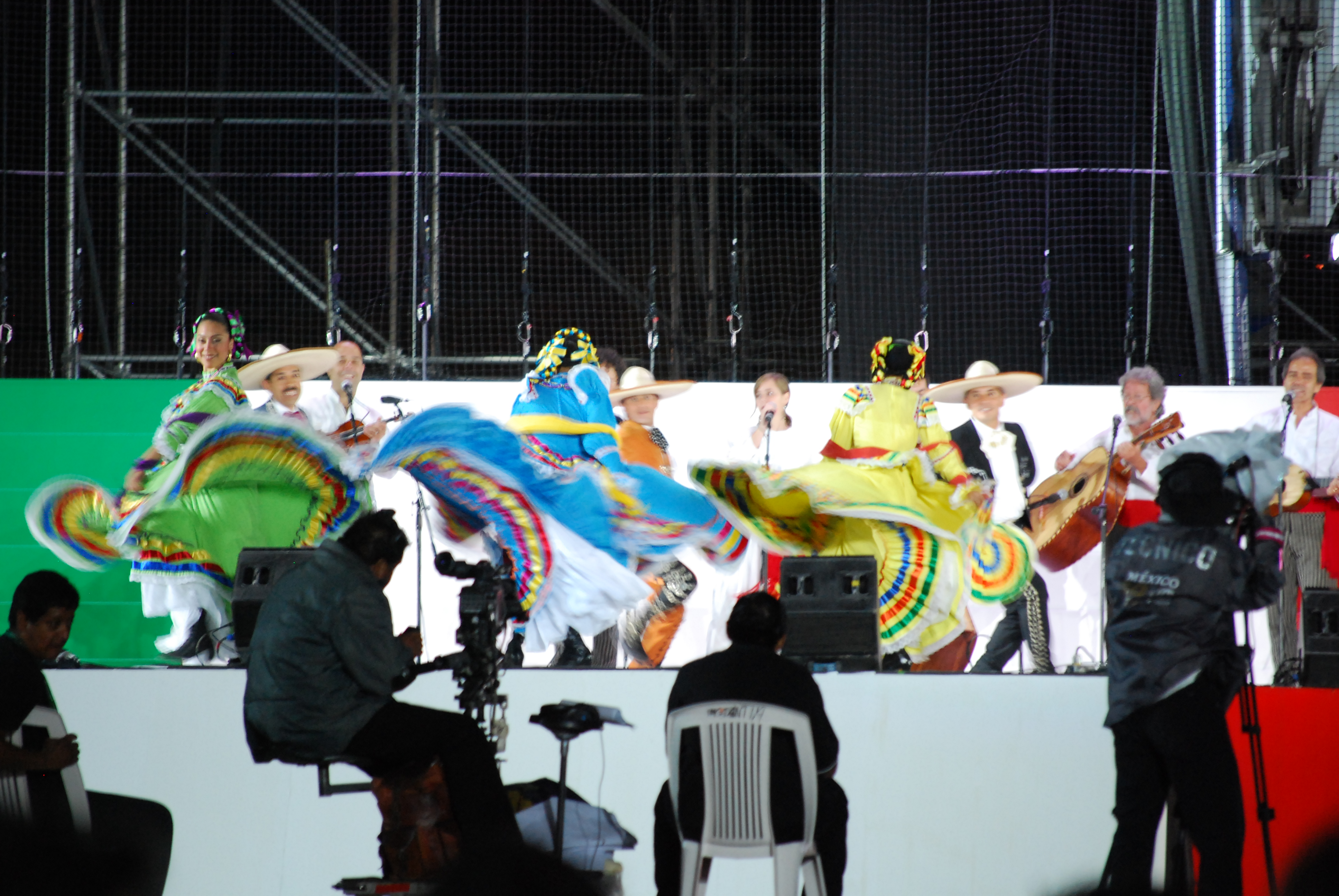
Ballet folklórico at the Celebration of Mexican political anniversaries in 2010.

Los Chivos is another dance performed in Guerrero. It is dancers perform movements related to that of goats (chivos) accompanies by wood boxes used as drums and an instruments made from a donkey's jaw, which is rubbed on the side with a wooden stick. The dancers wear red wooden masks with deer antlers covered in streamers and paper flowers, along with skirts that reach the knees. Machomula refers to a wooden horse's head which is central to the dance performed in the Costa Chica of Guerrero. The night before a festival, this head is carried on beams all night while the men sing and sometimes perform parodies. On the day of the festival, they form a procession with the guardian of the horse's head in front on a wooden horse. Pescados (Fish) is performed mostly in Guerrero by participants acting as fishermen with nets and with those that play the part of fish who are identified by small wooden fish that hang from their shoulders. There is one other character which is a lizard, who is covered with a wooden frame that opens and closes its mouth. It also carries some barbed wire which it used to try to hit the fishermen. It is similar to the Tortuga (turtle) dance. Tecuanes comes from Nahuatl which means jaguars or tigers. This dance is the only which features this animal. In this dance, the animal chases children and is in turned pursued by men, who wear masks, boots or chaps and very large sombreros. They carry whips which they use to hit the tiger who wears padding. The dance is very similar to Tlacololeros in its movements. Both are performed in Guerrero.

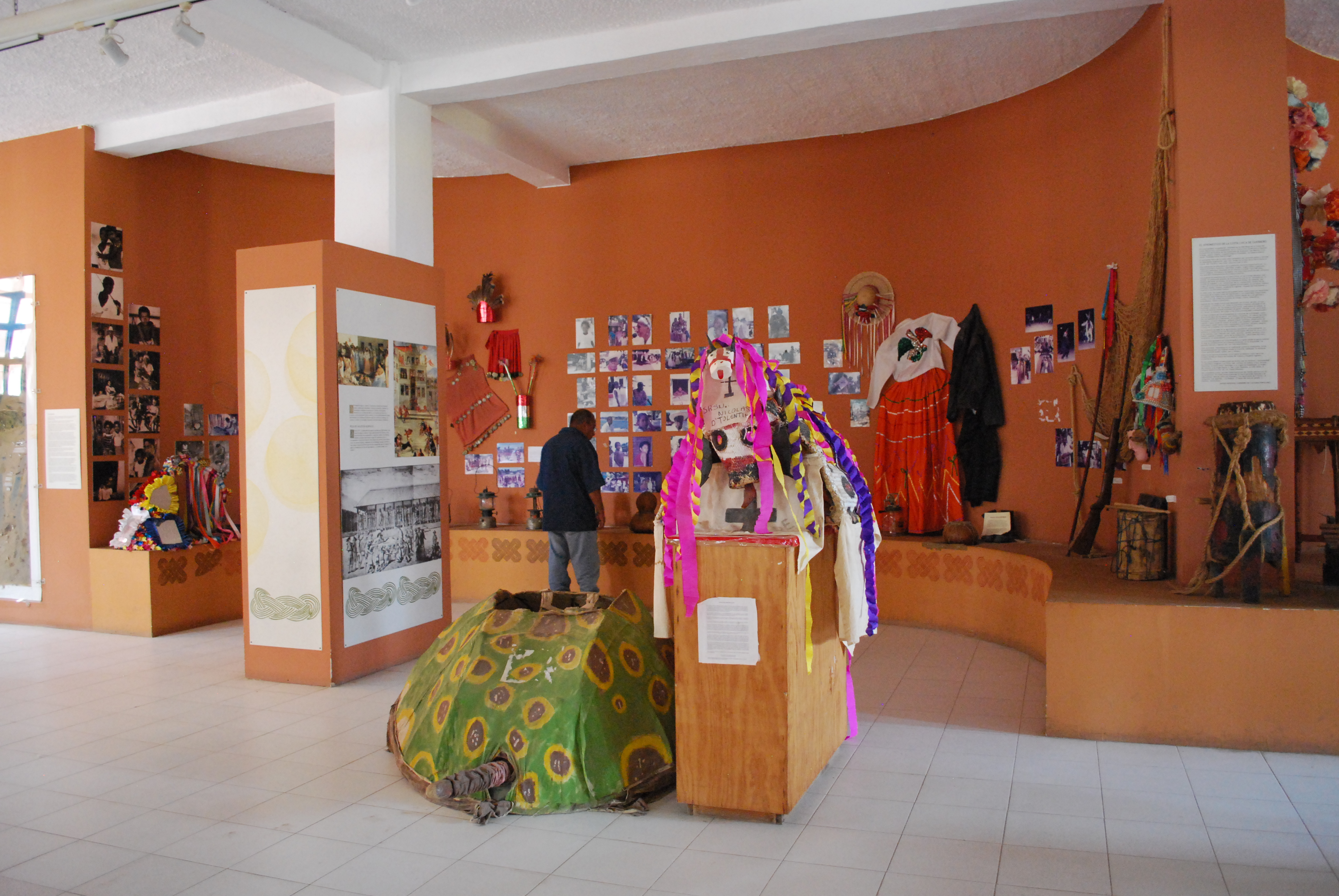
Frames used for the Turtle and Straw Bull dances in the Museo de las Culturas Afromestizas in Cuajinicuilapa Guerrero

Los Mudos (The Mute) takes its name from the fact that participants are forbidden to speak during the ceremony and in some cases throughout the festival. The costume is feminine in appearance using rustic wigs made of maguey fibers braided with ribbons of many colors. This dance is common among the Nahuas in Guerrero.

=== Michoacán ===
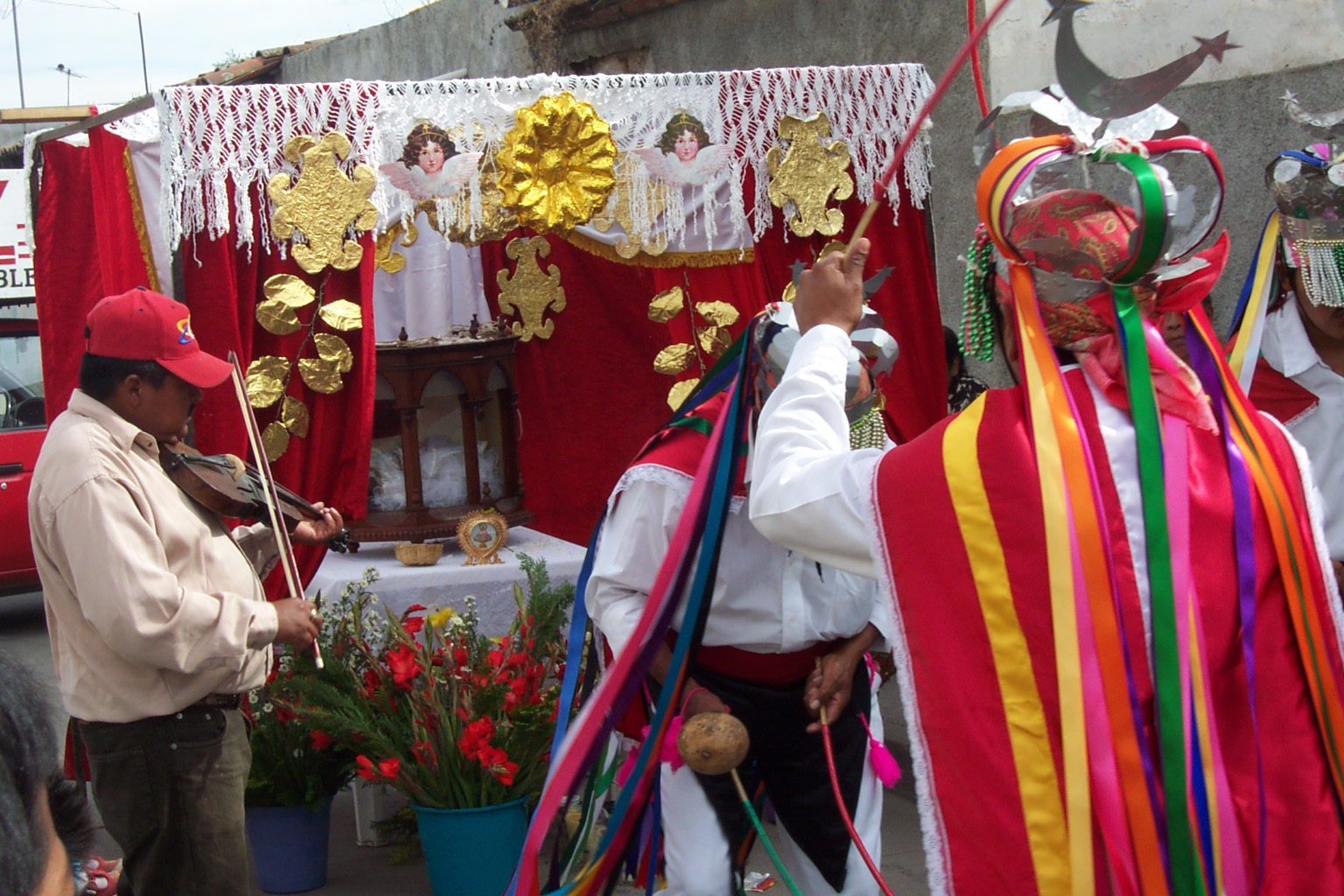
Scene from performance of Moros y Cristianos (Moors and Christians)

Moros y cristianos (Moors and Christians) is not indigenous in origin. It was introduced by monks in the 16th century and widely practiced in central Mexico, especially Michoacán. The dancers form two groups to represents the two religious, each wearing masks and capes with Moors marked by a crescent moon and the Christians with a cross. The other elements of the dress vary widely with some versions having the Christians dressed as charros. This dance is part of a larger ceremony that can last up to two days and consist in mock battles and negotiations as well as dance. The voices of the participants generally sing and speak with a high-pitch or falsetto voice. Santiagos is named after the patron saint of Spain, Saint James. It is a dance of Spanish origin similar to Moros y cristianos except that the Saint is the main character. Sometimes the character rides on a real horse or the costume can contain a frame of a horse.

La Conquista, sometimes called Los Marqueses tells the story of the Spanish conquest of the Aztec Empire. There are dancers who represent the main protagonists including Hernán Cortés, La Malinche and Moctezuma. Various versions with include other characters. Those who represent the Spanish soldiers carry arquebuses and usually wear modern clothing. Those who represent the indigenous wear feathers and carry bows and arrows frequently with those dressed as Eagle and Jaguar warriors of rank. All the dancers wear masks. The dance represents the battles between the two groups ending either with the killing of Moctezuma or with the baptism of the indigenous. This is a widely performed dance especially in Michoacán and Jalisco.

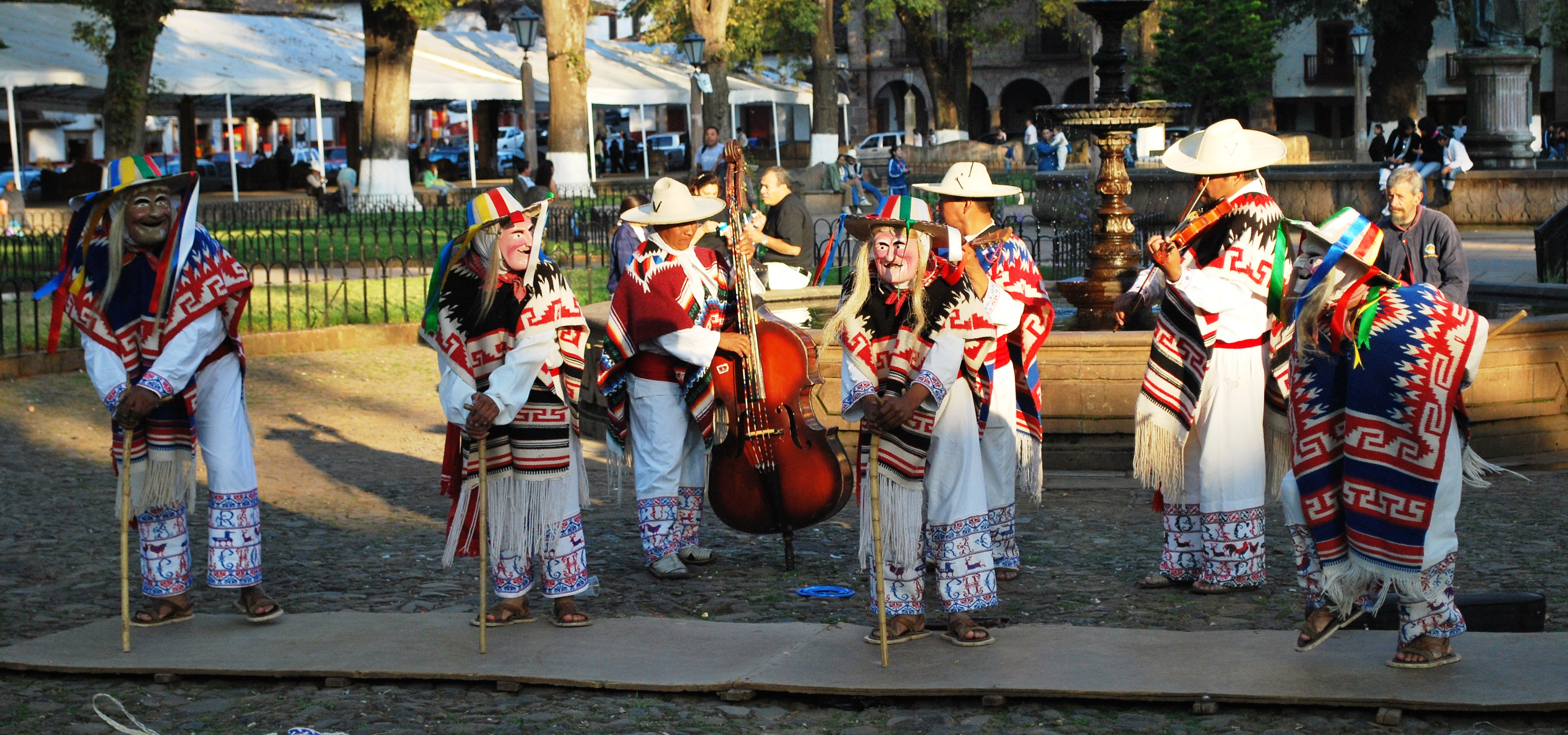
Danza de los Viejitos performed in Pátzcuaro.

The Danza de los Viejitos (Dance of the Little Old Men) is performed in Michoacán, especially in the Lake Pátzcuaro area. The dance as known today was created by Gervasio López in the mid 20th century, who had a passion for traditional folk music and dance of this region. While the dance is “new” it is based on ancient rhythms and steps and accompanied by traditional instruments. The dancers basically imitate old men, dressed in traditional indigenous clothing and carrying canes. The dancers wear wood-soled shoes to accentuate the noise made while stomping. Although a regional dance, it has been performed abroad in the United States and Europe. Other dances from the state of Michoacán include Las Iguiris, Mariposas, Danza de los Tumbis, Paloteros and Pescado Blanco.

Paixtles is one of the few pre Hispanic dances to remain free from European influence, mostly performed in Jalisco and Nayarit. Participants cover themselves with the moss that hangs from Montezuma Cypress trees and carry staves which have the head of a deer at one end. They accompany themselves with maracas that they carry. Dancers wear masks to cover the face and ribbons that hang from the head.

Other important dances include La Judea, danced by the Coras during Holy Week in Nayarit, Sonajeros, danced in the south of Jalisco, and the Dance of the Cúrpites

Another place that has unique dresses for dancing is Michoacán, Mexico. Their dresses are very different from Jalisco. The dresses in Michoacán are very simple but elegant. They have a long skirt with very little detail of ribbons. The upper part of the dress is made up of a simple blouse that has embroider detail around the neck, they also use a belt and an embroidered apron. In Michoacán they have many dresses depending on the event, they have dresses that are for everyday wear and dresses for special ceremonies or occasions. There are many parts that go along with the dress from the hair to all the accessories that they wear. The everyday dress for women in Michoacán is made up of five items of clothing. These items consist of an underskirt, skirt, an apron, shawl, and lastly a blouse which is also known as a guanengo. All of these item are made of different fabrics and color which makes each item stand out. Like the dresses from Jalisco, the dresses in Michoacán also have bright colors with little use of black. For special day like Palm Sunday for example, they add more accessories. These accessories consist of sashes, beaded necklaces, hats woven of palm leaves, masks, fresh fruit, mirrors and tinsel. They also different accessories for special ceremonies that are done in their communities which makes them stand out due to the variety in their dresses.
