= Huapango =

Family of Mexican music styles

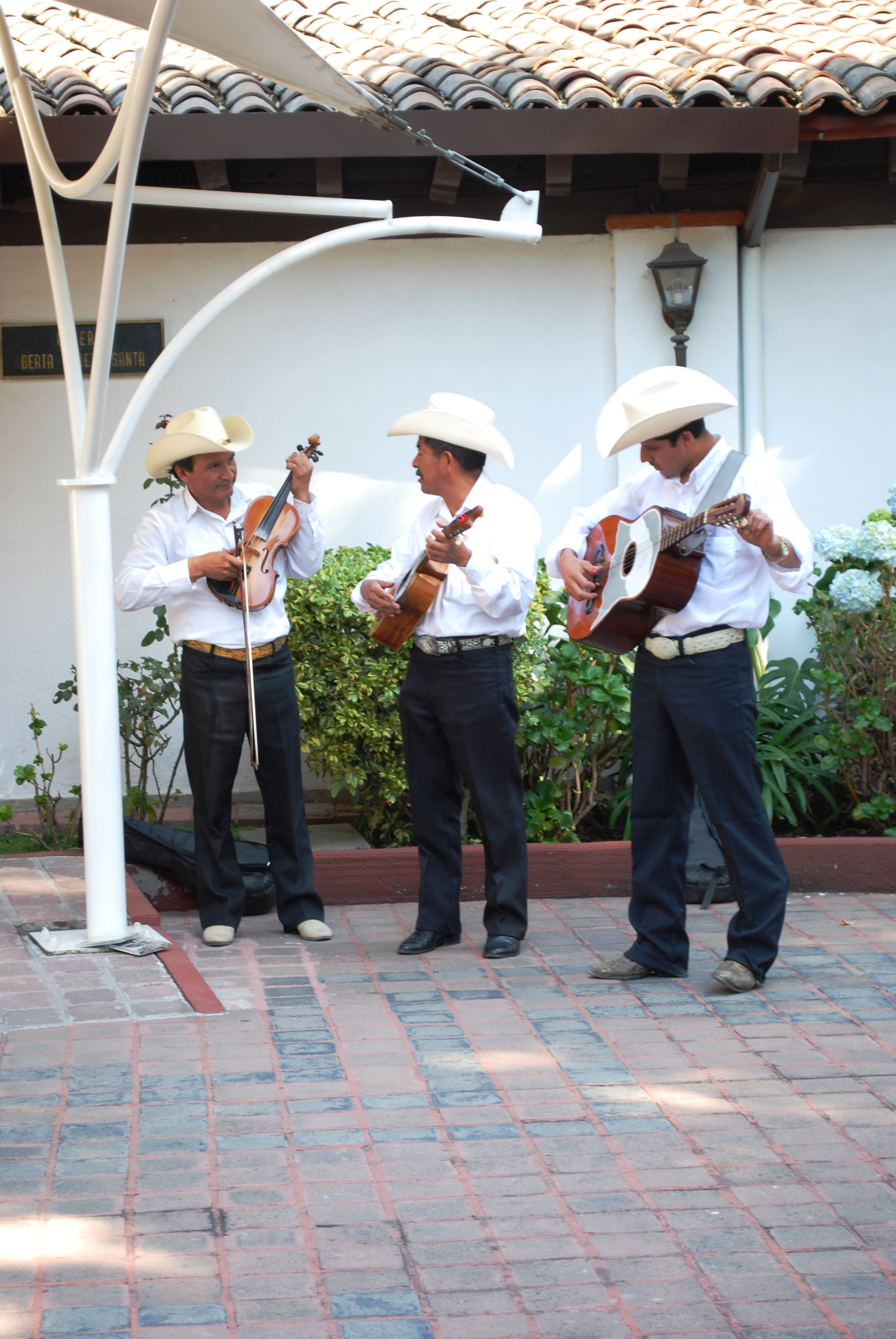
Son huasteco trio at the Alfredo Guati Rojo National Watercolor Museum in Mexico City

Huapango is a family of Mexican music styles. The word likely derives from the Nahuatl word cuauhpanco that literally means 'on top of the wood', alluding to a wooden platform on which dancers perform zapateado dance steps. It is interpreted in different forms, the most common being the classic huapango interpreted by a trio of musicians (un trio huasteco); the huapango norteño interpreted by a group (un conjunto norteño); and the huapango de mariachi, which can be performed by a large group of musicians.

== Huapango huasteco (son huasteco) ==
La malagueña (son huasteco)
A traditional piece from East Mexico

The classical trio huasteco brings together a violin, a huapanguera and a jarana huasteca. The classical huapango is characterized by a complex rhythmic structure mixing duple and triple metres which reflect the intricate steps of the dance. When the players sing (in a duet, in a falsetto tone), the violin stops, and the zapateado (the rhythm provided by heels hitting the floor) softens. The huapango is danced by men and women as couples. A very popular huapango is El querreque, in which two singers alternate pert and funny repartées.

== Huapango arribeño ==
Huapango arribeño or son arribeño is a style of music played in the "zona media" region (part of San Luis Potosi, Queretaro and Guanajuato). Traditionally it is played using four instruments (jarana huasteca, huapanguera and two violins). The lyrics are mostly improvised and sung in the style of décimas, or versed poems. Guillermo Velázquez is a popular musician of the style.

== Huapango norteño ==
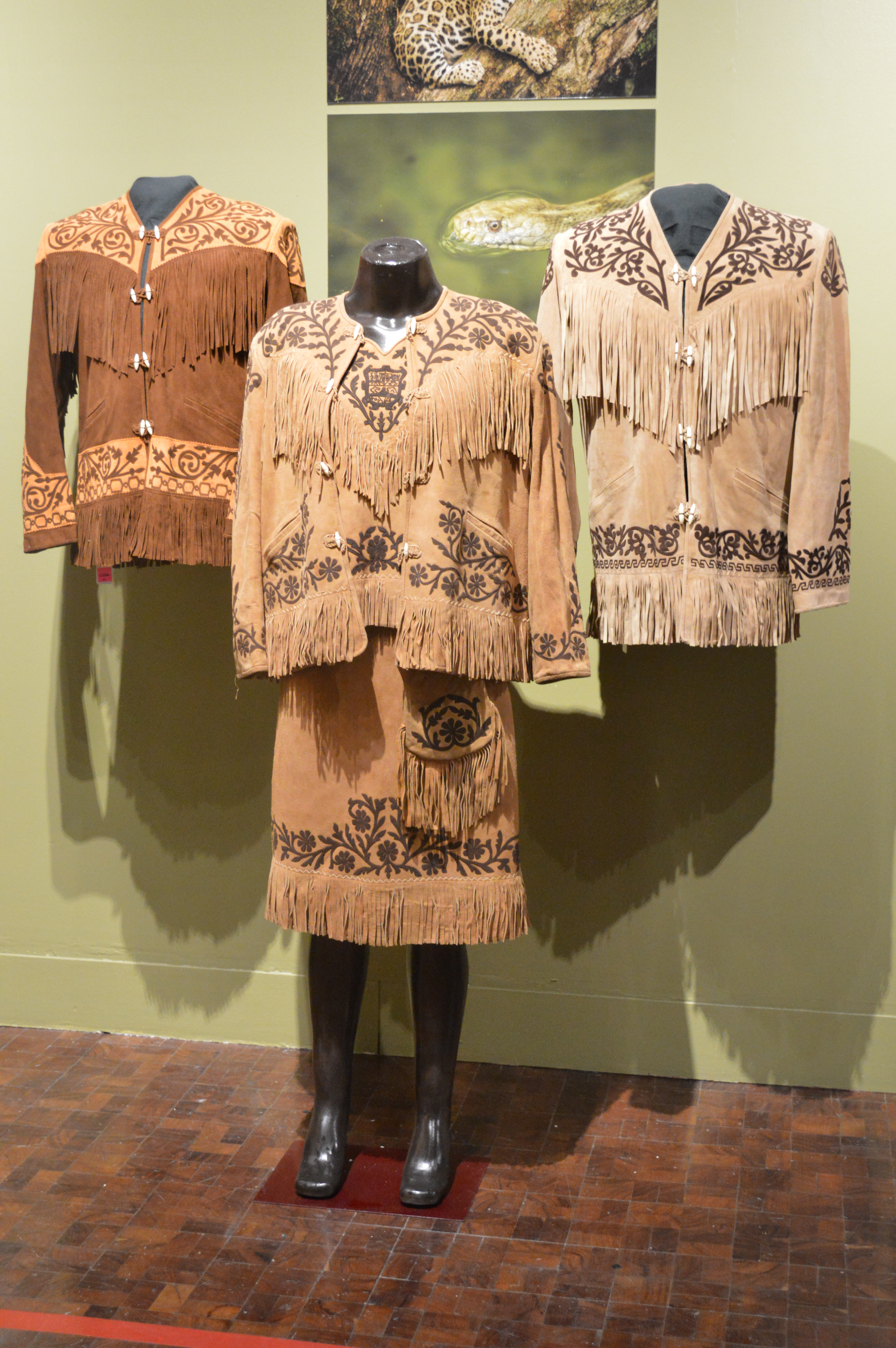
Fringed leather jackets called cueras and outfit for dancing to huapangos and sones from Tamaulipas displayed at the Museo de Arte Popular in Mexico City

The huapango norteño is a fast dance piece in 6/8. This dance style and rhythm was included in early conjunto norteño. It is performed by conjunto norteño (northern groups). The instrumentation of this type of ensemble consists of accordion, bajo sexto, double bass, drums and saxophone.

== Huapango de mariachi ==
The huapango in mariachi has alternating rhythmic patterns similar to the son jaliscience. Both major and minor keys are used. One of the distinctive characteristics is the use of a falsetto by the vocalist. Another characteristic is the use of busy violin passages for the musical introductions and interludes. Famous songs include "Rogaciano el huapanguero", "Cucurrucucú paloma" and "Malagueña".

== Huapango by Moncayo ==
The Huapango is a 1941 classical piece composed by José Pablo Moncayo, using as inspiration several Veracruz huapangos and the huapango rhythm.

== See also ==
- Folk dance of Mexico
