= Huapanguera =

Mexican musical instrumental

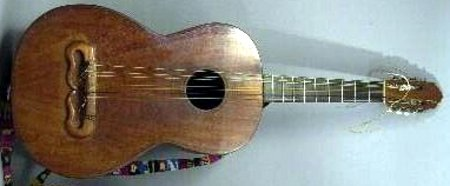
- Huapanguera

String instrument
- Other names: Guitarra quinta huapanguera, guitarra huapanguera
- Classification: String instrument
- Hornbostel–Sachs classification: (Composite chordophone)

Related instruments
- Jarana huasteca

The huapanguera, guitarra quinta huapanguera or guitarra huapanguera is a Mexican guitar-like instrument that usually forms part of a conjunto huasteco ensemble, along with the jarana huasteca and violin. Because of its large body and deeper structure, the huapanguera is able provide a much deeper sound compared to a regular acoustic guitar. Here it takes on the role of the bass instrument using a rhythmical strumming technique. Its physical construction features a large resonating body with a short neck. It normally has around 10 frets which stop at the point where the fingerboard meets the top.

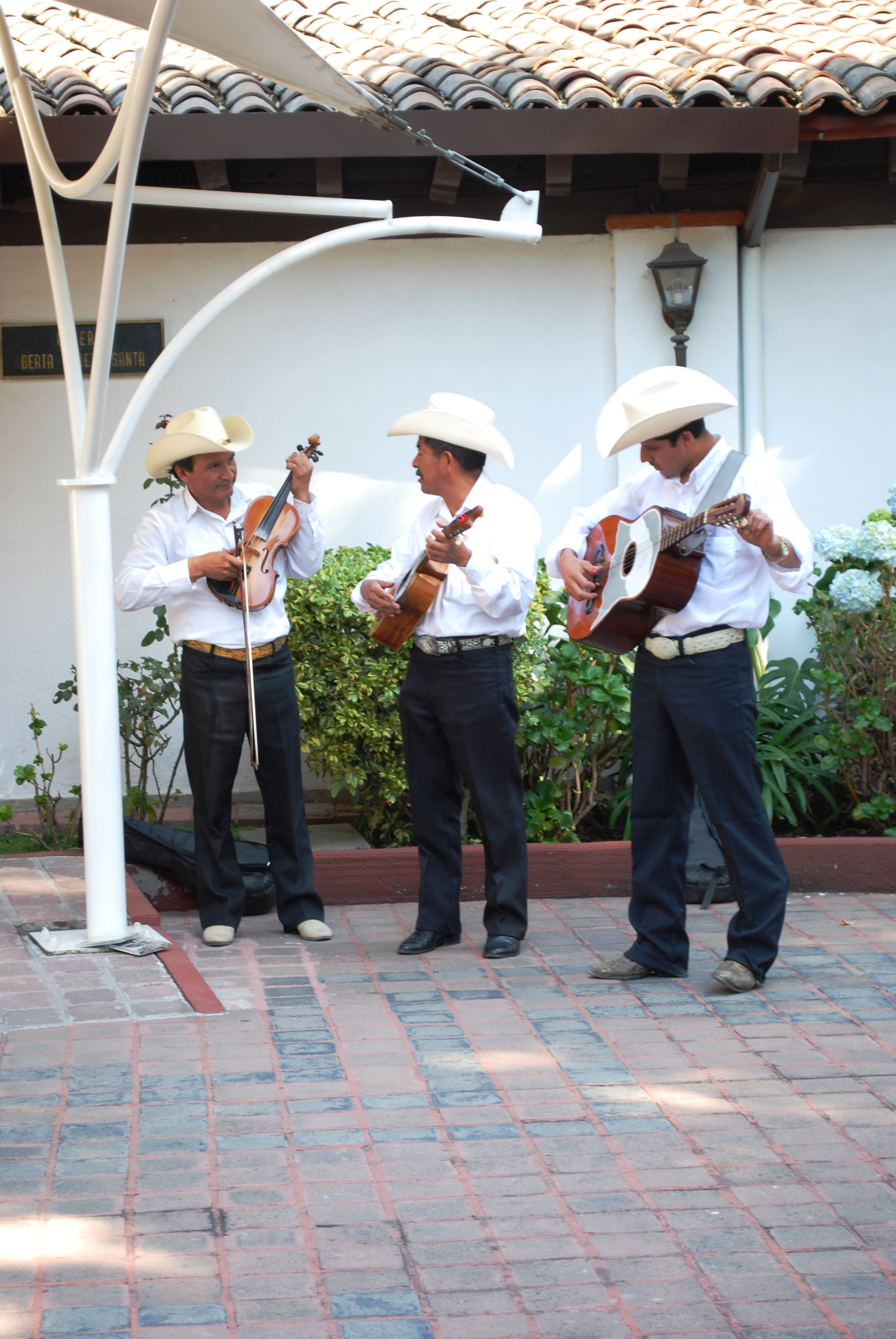
A son huasteco trio, featuring a violin, jarana huasteca and huapanguera.

The stringing and tuning arrangement consists of 8 nylon strings in 5 courses. Standard tuning is G2+G2 – D3+D3 – G3+G3 – B3+ – E4 (GG – dd – gg – b – e in Helmholtz pitch notation), although there are many other string arrangements and tunings.

== Son Huasteco ==
The quinta huapanguera is an instrument distinct of the Huasteca region of Mexico. It is used when playing their specific folk genre called son huasteco. This style of Mexican music is characterized by a trio of instruments consisting of the violin, Jarana huasteca (a small five-string guitar) and the quinta huapanguera.

Huapanguera playing "El Fandanguito"
