= Zapateado (Mexico) =

Group of dance styles of Mexico, akin to tap dance and flamenco

The zapateado is a group of dance styles of Mexico, characterized by a lively rhythm punctuated by the striking of the dancer's shoes, akin to tap dance. The name derives from the Spanish word zapato for "shoe": zapatear means to strike with a shoe. It is widely used in sones, huapangos and chilenas.

The term is also used to refer to percussive footwork in some Spanish/Latin dances that involve elaborate shoe clicking and tapping and to the percussion music produced by shoe striking.

== See also ==
- Zapateado (Spain)
