= Jarana huasteca =

String instrument developed in Mexico

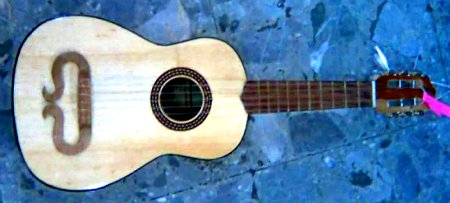
- Jarana huasteca

String
- Other names: Jarana de son huasteco, jaranita
- Classification: String instrument
- Hornbostel–Sachs classification: (Composite chordophone)
- Developed: Mexico

Related instruments
- Huapanguera

The jarana huasteca, jarana de son huasteco or jaranita is a string instrument. It is most often called simply jarana. It is a guitar-like chordophone with 5 strings, tuned in thirds (low to high): G, B, D, F# and A. It has a range similar to the mandolin, and a scale length of around 40 cm.

Jarana Huasteca tuning

Jarana huasteca playing El fandanguito

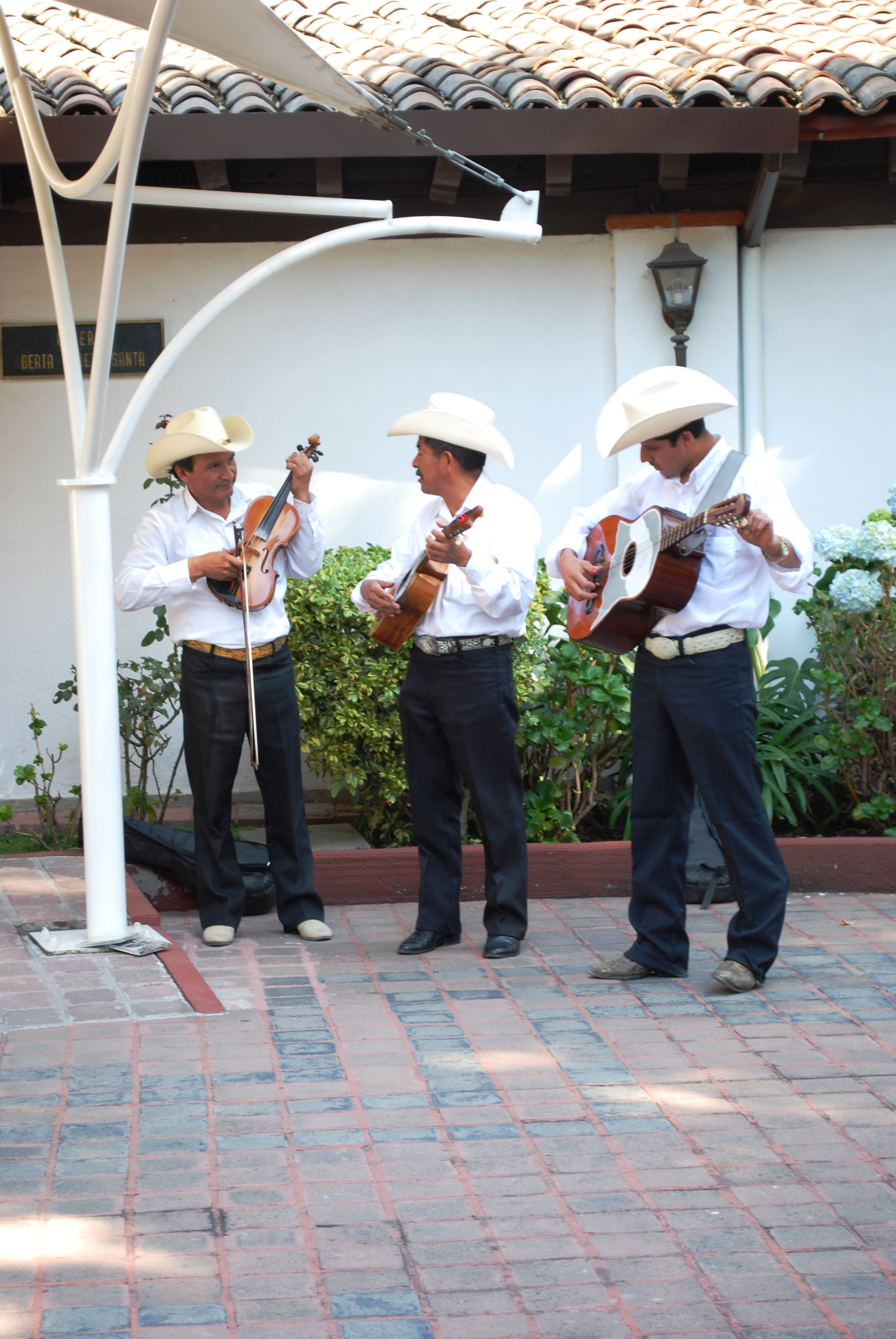
A son huasteco trio, featuring a violin, jarana huasteca and huapanguera

The instrument usually forms part of the trío huasteco ensemble, along with the quinta huapanguera and violin, taking on the role of the rhythmic accompaniment. It is usually used to play huasteca music.

Compared to the guitarra huapanguera, the instrument is smaller and higher-pitched.
