= Mariachi Charanda =

- Genres: Mexican son music (old mariachi)
- Years active: 1979–present
- Members: José Luis Perujo, Javier Lassard, Carlos Carral, Sergio Mendez, Emilio Perujo and María Perujo.
- Website: https://www.facebook.com/pages/Mariachi-Charanda/306224399512990

Mariachi Charanda is a traditional mariachi or “son” musical group from Mexico. The group works to conserve the version of this music, originally done only with string instruments, working with educational and cultural institutions to present this antique style of music all over Mexico and abroad.

Founded in 1979, the group has been together over thirty years, with members José Luis Perujo on the violin, Javier Lassard on violin, Carlos Carral in Mexican vihuela, Sergio Mendez on guitarra de golpe, Emilio Perujo on guitarrón mexicano, with vocals by María Perujo.

The group’s repertoire mostly consists of traditional son music from western states, Jalisco, Colima, Nayarit and Michoacán, but it has incorporated some work from other regions in Mexico. Songs include El Capulinero, Atotonilco, El Sauce y la Palma, La Pulquería, México Lucido, El Toro Viejo, La Tequilera and El Huizache.

Mariachi Charanda collaborates with cultural and educational institutions such as the Secretaría de Educación Pública, CONACULTA and UNAM appearing on programs such as Radio Educación, Radio Universidad, Once TV, Cadena Tres and the Discovery Channel. They have also participated in children's events such as Alas y Raíces and Jugares y Juglares in Mexico City.

The group has performed in most of the principal theaters of Mexico and have appeared in every state of the country, especially at cultural festivals in San Luis Potosí, Tlaxcala, Jalisco, Puebla, Morelos and other states. They have also appeared at the First International Mariachi Encounter (Primer Encuentro Internacional de Mariachi) and the ninth National Traditional Mariachi Encounter (Encuentro Nacional de Mariachi Tradicional) in Guadalajara. In addition, they have toured Europe (Spain, France, Greece), South America (Brazil, Argentina) and various cities in the United States and Canada.
