= Sones de México Ensemble Chicago =

Sones de México Ensemble Chicago is a Chicago, United States, folk music group that specializes in the Mexican musical tradition known as son.

== History ==
Sones de México Ensemble Chicago formed in 1994 to keep the Mexican son tradition alive in its many regional forms, including the regional styles of huapango, gustos, chilenas, and son jarocho, among others. As performers and recording artists, the ensemble has developed and popularized many original arrangements of Mexican traditional tunes touring mostly in the Midwest, East Coast and Southern U.S. Some of its original work has experimented cross-culturally with symphonic, Irish, folk, country, jazz, and rock music, though never abandoning its roots in Mexican son.

Also a not-for-profit 501(c)(3) organization, the ensemble is committed to teaching. The ensemble members reach out to young and old with many of their educational programs nationwide.

Sones de México's album Esta Tierra Es Tuya (This Land Is Your Land) was nominated both for a Latin Grammy for Best Folk Album of 2007 and for a Grammy for Best Mexican/Mexican-American Album. The title song is the group's translation of the Woody Guthrie song, with some slight modifications for the Mexican immigrant context. That album also included arrangements of J.S. Bach's "Brandenburg Concerto No. 3" and of Led Zeppelin's instrumental "Four Sticks", with most of the remaining nine pieces being traditional, all played "on over 50 all-acoustic instruments from México".

In 2010 Sones de México marked the 100th anniversary of the Mexican Revolution with its ¡Viva la Revolución! album. In 2012, their album 13 B’ak’tun celebrated "the beginning of a new era according to the Mayan calendar". Starting in 2014, with the help of a grant from the National Endowment for the Arts, the group created the musical/educational program A Musical Geography of Mexico. In 2016, Sones de México developed and performed their soundtrack to Sergei Eisenstein’s unfinished silent film ¡Que Viva Mexico!.

On September 8, 2015 at the Library of Congress, the just-inducted United States Poet Laureate Juan Felipe Herrera, Sones de Mexico, and their songwriting class, cowrote the ballad "Corrido de Sandra Bland", in Spanish, to honor the Chicago woman who had died in police custody in Texas. Sones de Mexico performed the song the next day.

Starting in 2021, two Sones de Mexico members - Juan Díes and Lorena Iñiguez - collaborated for recording and performances, including on a tour of Mexico, with Chicago's multicultural Surabhi Ensemble, founded by Saraswathi Ranganathan. They are planning additional tours together, in India and Vietnam for late 2024-early 2025.

As of 2024, Sones de Mexico continue to perform occasionally in the Chicago area.

=== Ensemble members ===
When Esta Tierra Es Tuya was being recorded, Sones de México consisted of Victor Pichardo (music director; founding member; primarily on violin), Juan Díes (CEO and producer; founding member; primarily on bass and guitarrón mexicano), Zacbé Pichardo (son of Victor Pichardo; primarily on harp), Lorena Iñiguez (primarily dance, zapateado tarima tap-dance box, Mexican vihuela), Javier Saume, and Juan Rivera. In 2014, Victor Pichardo left to live in his native Mexico, returning to the ensemble in 2018; since 2020, while living in Maxico, he has performed with the band whenever possible. By February 2017, the actively performing ensemble consisted of Díes, Iñiguez, Zacbé Pichardo, Gonzalo Cordova (founding member), Eric Hines (drums and percussion), and Rudy Piñon. Cordova left again circa 2017. In the dance and tarima role, Iñiguez left in 2017 and rejoined circa 2021. In her absence, that role was performed by Eréndira Izguerra 2017-2019 and Karen Marcial 2019-circa 2021. In 2022, the Sones de Mexico performers were Díes, Victor Pichardo, Iñiguez, Zacbé Pichardo, Eric Hines, and new member Irekani Ferreyra (requinto jarocho, violin; also of Chicago ensembles Son Monarcas and Nahui Ollin).

== Discography - Albums ==
All self-released by Sones de México Ensemble Chicago, on CD and download:

- ¡Que Florezca! (Let it Bloom) (1996)
- Fandango on 18th Street (2002)
- Esta Tierra Es Tuya (This Land is Your Land) (2007)
- Fiesta Mexicana (a children’s album) (2010)
- ¡Viva la Revolución! (2010)
- 13 B’ak’tun (2012-2013)
