= Cutumay Camones =

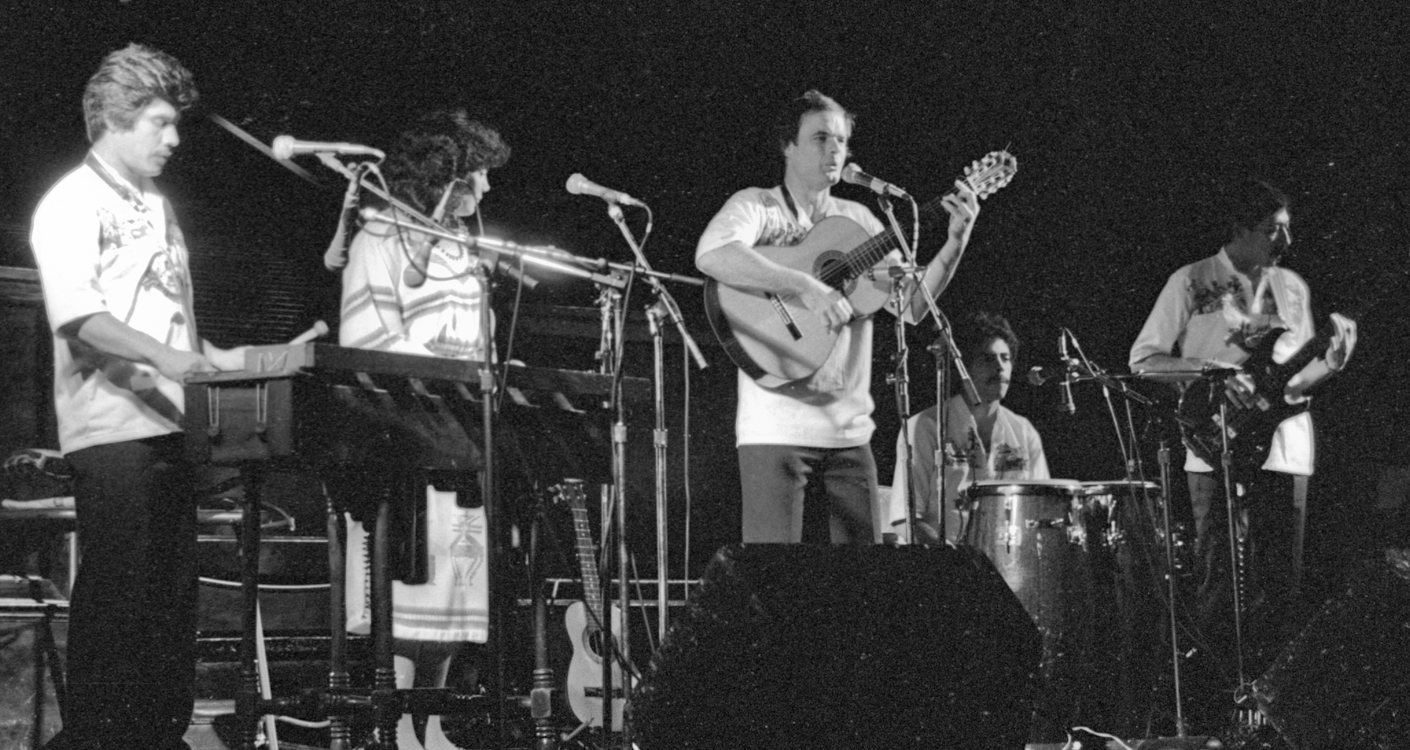

Background information
- Origin: El Salvador
- Years active: 1982–1988
- Past members: Gabino, Ricardo, Israel, Lolo, Paco, Eduardo, Teresa

Cutumay Camones was a band from El Salvador, formed in 1982. Its stated objective was to recover Salvadorean cultural roots and to provide popular music for the national liberation movement.

In May 1982, Cutumay Camones was formed by a directive from the People's Revolutionary Army of El Salvador, a part of the FMLN, as cultural ambassadors for the national liberation movement. The name comes from the Nahuatl for a town in Santa Ana in western El Salvador, where the FMLN had an uprising in January 1981.

The group originally had three members: Eduardo, Gabino, and Ricardo, and two months later Paco, Teresa and Israel joined. By 1984, Lolo had joined, and eventually the group consisted of five permanent members: Lolo, Paco, Israel, Eduardo, and Teresa. Except for Eduardo, and Israel none of the members were musicians prior to joining. Cutumay Camones used different rhythms such as Son cumbia classical and rancheras, and instruments such as marimba, accordion, and guitarrón.

In 1988, the group officially disbanded. Lolo left El Salvador in 1990 and later played in the band Los Jornaleros del Norte. Paco was assassinated in 1996 by the National Civil Police, and Eduardo died in 2007 from cancer.

In 2012, Teresa from Cutumay Camones joined with members of another revolutionary Salvadron music group from the 1980s, Guinama, to form a new group. The fusion of these historic bands is called Cutumay Guinama. Their mission is to keep alive the memories of the sacrifices made for liberty during the civil war, and to continue promoting social change with their new recordings.

== Discography ==
- Vamos Ganando La Paz (1982)
- Por Eso Luchamos (1984)
- Patria Chiquita Mia (1987)
- Llegó la Hora (1988)
- El Salvador, un Canto por la Memoria de Eduardo y Paco Contra la Explotacion Minera

includes tree songs "Bolivar" recorded in Venezuela in the first "Festival de la cancion bolivariana" with the help of "Ali Primera" "Primer instrumental" a collection of traditional music in marimba and "Palomita Blanca" recorded in the former soviet union
