= Jarabe =

Traditional mariachi song form

Jarabe Tapatío

The jarabe is one of the most traditional song forms of the mariachi genre. In the Spanish language, jarabe literally means syrup, which probably refers to the mixture of meters within one jarabe (compare salsa).

Typically, a jarabe will go from a 6/8 to other sections with 3/4, 2/4, return to 6/8 and end in another meter. The 6/8 rhythmic pattern is a constant pattern with no contratiempos as in the son jaliscience. Although today the jarabes are instrumental songs only, the jarabes originated as a medley of favorite regional sones and canciones. The regional nature of the jarabes are often visible in their name, e.g. Jarabe tapatío (Tapatío is something or someone from the city of Guadalajara, Jalisco). The jarabe is traditionally performed with dancers, and in its traditional form constituted a highly improvised choreographic tradition.

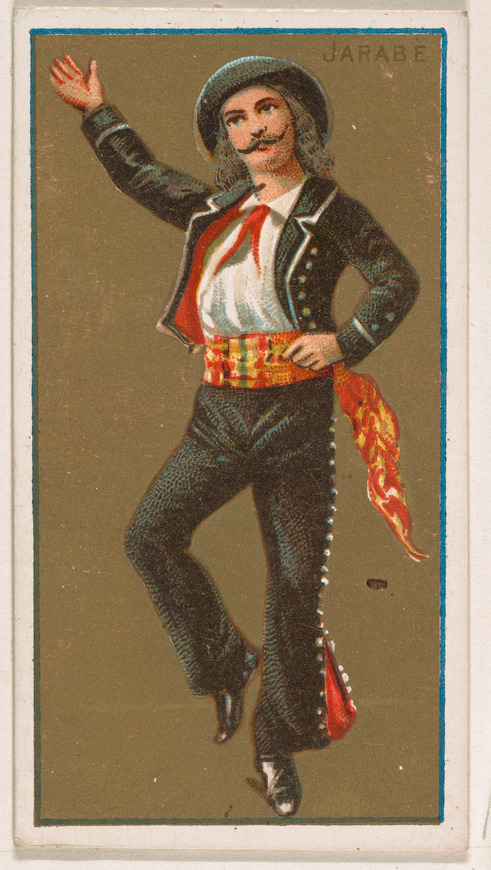
Jarabe, from National Dances (N225, Type 1) issued by Kinney Bros. MET DPB874504

While most jarabes from Jalisco are not sung, those from Zacatecas do have verses. Many of these traditional jarabes from Zacatecas are being revived by the traditional group Los Jaraberos de Nochistlán.

Jarabe verses were a vehicle of popular resistance during the Mexican Revolution. While church and state decried them as immoral and subversive, and the accompanying dance as lascivious, the people felt the jarabe represented them and their political aspirations.
