= Guitarra panzona =

Mexican deep-bodied guitar

Guitarra Panzona
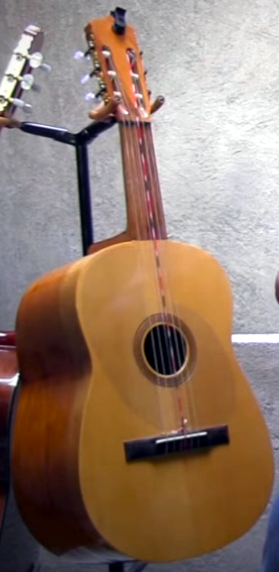
- Guitarra Panzona

String instrument
- Other names: guitarra túa
- Classification: String instrument
- Hornbostel–Sachs classification: (Composite chordophone)
- Developed: Jalisco and Michoacán, Mexico

Related instruments
- Mexican vihuela, Guitarrón mexicano, Huapanguera, Jarana huasteca, Guitar.

The guitarra panzona, guitarra túa or guitarra blanca is a Mexican guitar with six strings and deep body. This guitar is sometimes substituted by a guitarron. It provides a tubby sounding rhythm for calentano music, accompanying violin, guitar and tamborita.
