= Juan Dies =

Juan Díes is the co-founder and executive director of Sones de Mexico Ensemble, a Chicago folk music group that specializes in the Mexican musical tradition known as son. Sones de Mexico was nominated for both a Grammy and a Latin Grammy in 2007.

Díes attended North Central High School. He has degrees from Earlham College and Indiana University Bloomington. In 2019, United States Artists awarded one of its USA Fellowships to him and in 2020 the Illinois Arts Council awarded one of its Artist Fellowship Awards to him.

Juan Díes is recipient of the 2026 National Heritage Fellowship from the National Endwoment for the Arts.
