= Son mexicano =

Style of Mexican folk music and dance

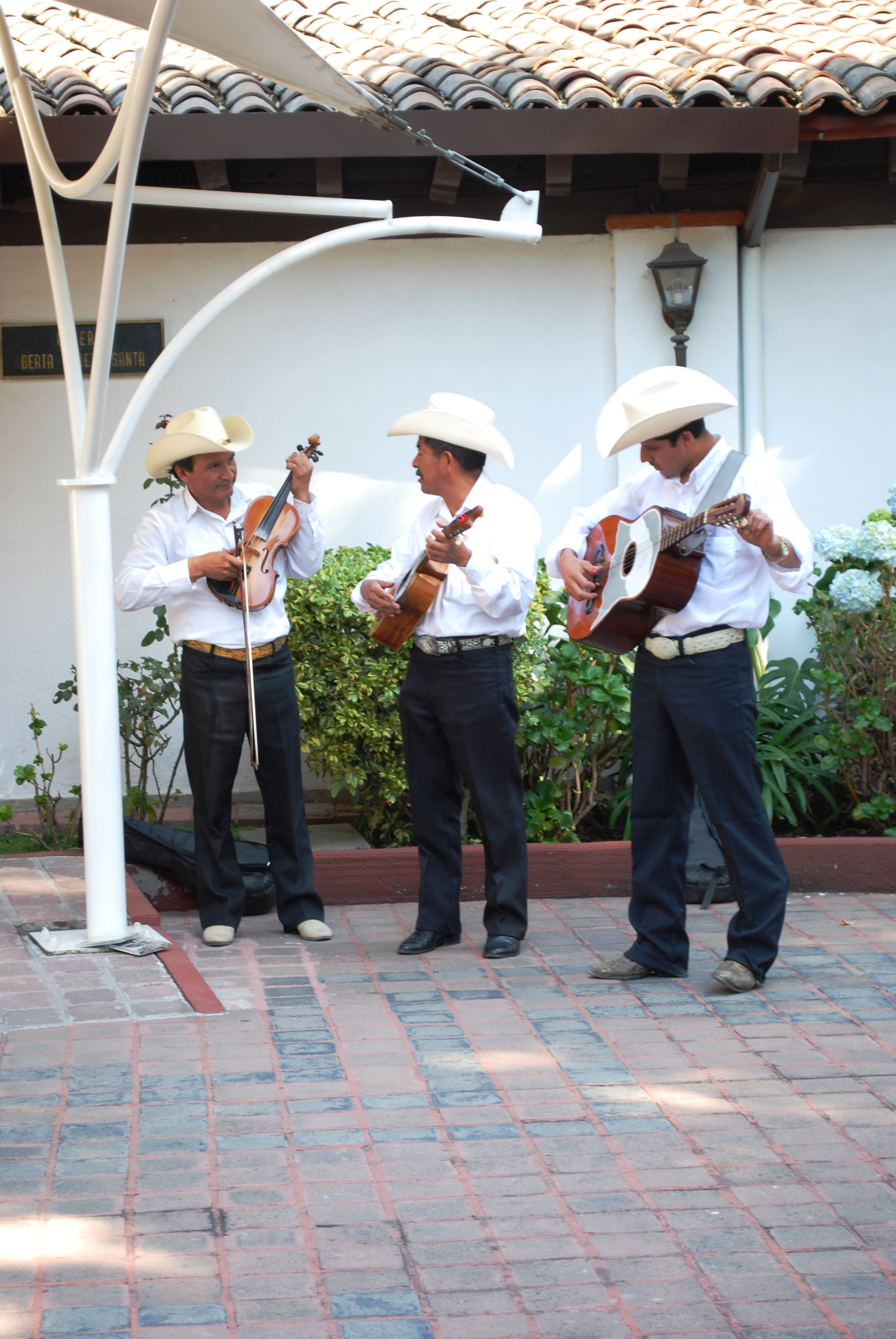
Son Huasteca trio at the Alfredo Guati Rojo National Watercolor Museum in Mexico City

Son mexicano (Spanish: [ˈsom mexiˈkano]) is a style of Mexican folk music and dance that encompasses various regional genres, all of which are called son. The term son mexicano literally translates to “the Mexican sound” in English. Mexican sones are often rooted in a mix of Spanish, African, and Indigenous musical elements.

Major son traditions are located in the La Huasteca region, the Gulf coast, the Pacific coast of Guerrero and Oaxaca, Michoacán and Jalisco (where it later developed into mariachi). The music is historically played on string instruments such as guitars and violins, with elements which have not changed since the Spanish baroque music that was introduced into Mexico during the colonial period. The dance associated with this music is social and often includes a stomping rhythm on a raised platform to provide percussion.

== Definition ==
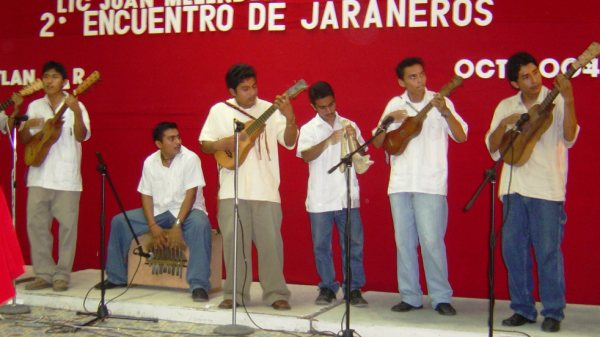
Son Jarocho group

The term "son" is given to a category of Mexican folk music covering various styles that vary by region. However, these styles share several common rhythms, lyrics and dance characteristics. The music is a mix of Spanish, African and Indigenous elements, which mingled at least as far back as the 18th century.

It is related to other Latin American folk music such as that of Colombia, Venezuela and Cuba but has had its development. It is most popular on the Gulf Coast and certain sections of the Pacific coast, with three main regional varieties: son jarocho in Veracruz, son huasteco (or huapango) in the La Huasteca region and son jaliscience, which has morphed into what is now known as Mariachi.

Mexican sones are usually played by conjuntos, or bands, playing string (most often guitar) and percussion instruments. String instruments vary from region to region, but may include violin, vihuela, jarana, guitar, guitarrón, guitarra de golpe, requinto, huapanguera, guitarra panzona, tololoche, and harp. Percussion may include tambor, tamborita, cajón, and quijada.

Most bands generally sing but there are usually one or two lead singers. Most songs are about love, mythological figures, legends, the landscapes of Mexico as well as political and religious themes. It is strongly tied to social dance, which varies by region, but not ceremonial. Dancers are generally couples executing zapateados on raised wooden dance floors. The zapateado provides most of the percussion in son jarocho and son huasteco.

Notable groups include Trío Los Chiles, which performs son huasteco; Son del pueblo, which performs songs from Guerrero and Oaxaca; Caña dulce caña brava, which performs son jarocho, and Chintacastla which performs son music from Tixtla in southern Veracruz.

== Common musical characteristics ==
Sesquialtera, the combination of 3/4 and 6/8 meter, predominates. Some, like the famous song La Bamba, are in the simpler, yet still syncopated, 2/4 meter. Sones are typically diatonic; while some songs are in the minor or harmonic minor scales, the major scale is most common. Many violinists and vocalists will harmonize melodies in thirds or sixths. Most chord progressions use only three chords: I or i, IV or iv, and V or V^{7}, though ii, III, VI, or ♭VII chords may feature in some songs. Lyrically, most songs follow the classic Spanish copla. Verses are built around four bar melodic phrases. These verses constitute the body of tunes called parties intermedia which are framed by introductions called entradas and codas called finales.

== History ==
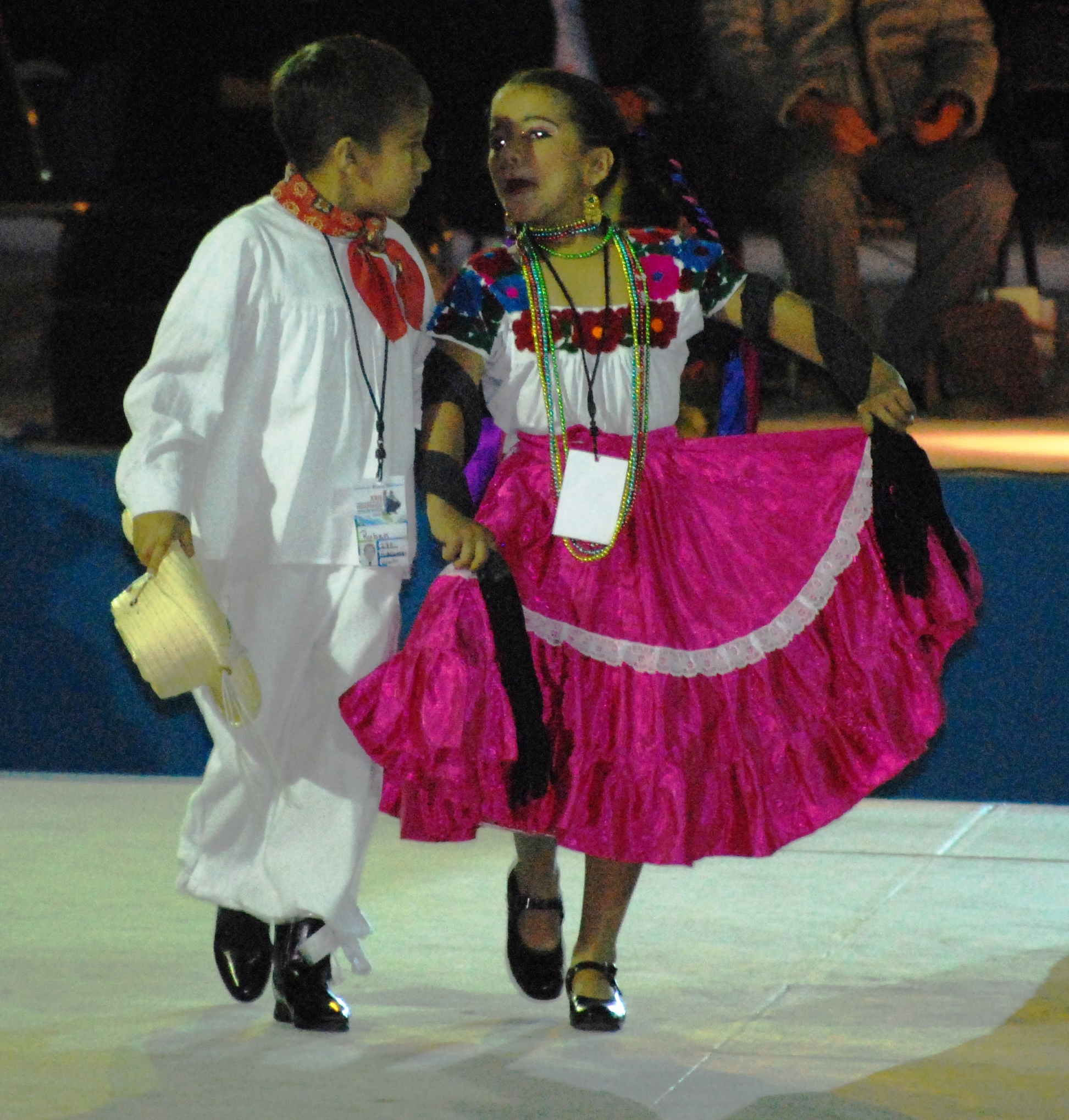
Dancers at the Concurso Nacional de Huapango in Pinal de Amoles Querétaro

As a base, son music in Mexico has the Baroque music of Spain, along with indigenous elements. The basic rhythms, instruments and musical practices have not changed much from Spanish music of the 16th and 17th centuries, especially for the Son Jarocho of Veracruz. These Spanish elements practically disappeared in the mother country by 1750. This Spanish heritage links it to other folk music styles in Latin America including the Cuban music by the same name, but it has had its development. In most son styles, percussion is provided by the stomping feet of dancers. This is from its indigenous heritage, from ceremonial marches.

While son has developed into different regional styles over the centuries, including Son Jarocho, Son Huasteco, Son Jaliscience (which later morphed into Mariachi), and forms on the west coast of Mexico such as Chilena in Guerrero and Oaxaca, several son styles share songs such as "El Gusto," which can be found in all three major types of son music, indicating a common ancestor for the three. Son music most likely originated in Veracruz, as the entry point for the Spanish and because of its links to the Caribbean and the slave trade. Son music was reinforced by the area's ties to the Caribbean, especially Cuba with Cuban son musicians coming to the port of Veracruz in the 1920s. Son jarocho gained popularity in the 1940s and 1950s not only in Veracruz but in Mexico City as well, in part due to the group Son de Cuba and its offshoots.

Son has enjoyed strong popularity both in Mexico and increasing popularity in the United States, especially among Mexican American communities. One reason for this popularity is the success of Ritchie Valens rock and roll version of the song "La Bamba" and other efforts to modernize the music. Not all son musicians are happy with the changes made in son music. Musician Julio del Razo complains that lyrics have become pornographic, less poetic and the rhythm has been distorted.

== Son jarocho ==
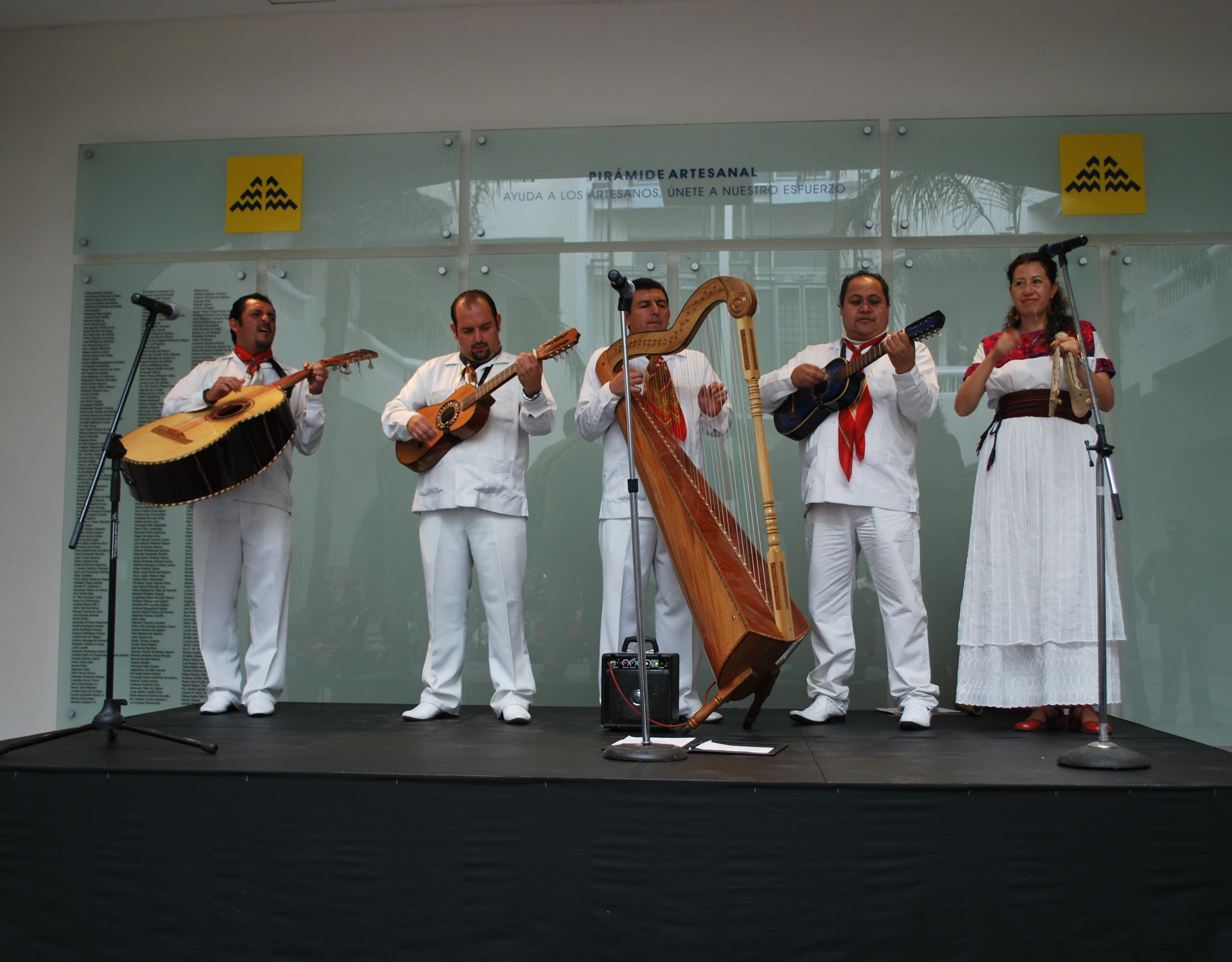
Son Jarocho group Zarahuato performing at the Museo de Arte Popular.

Son jarocho is from Veracruz. It is mostly played at events called "fandangos" similar to jam sessions where musicians gather to play, sing and dance on an elevated platform called a tarima. While the group Mono Blanco was credited for keeping the music popular in Veracruz in the 1970s, it is the Ritchie Valens rock and roll version of the standard “La Bamba” that made son jarocho internationally famous.

In the 2000s, son music, especially son jarocho has become popular in some Mexican-American communities such as in Los Angeles as a way to connect to their Mexican heritage. Los Angeles has hosted an annual son jarocho festival since about the same time. One notable California son group is the all-female Son del Centro based in Santa Ana, the heart of the Mexican-American community in Orange County. Son jarocho has been becoming popular in New York as well, mostly due to the group Radio Jarocho. This band has worked to adapt the style to their urban environment, making the songs shorter (about four minutes instead of ten, and with lyrics that reflect their reality).

== Son huasteco ==
Son Huasteco is performed in the states of Tamaulipas, Veracruz, Hidalgo, San Luis Potosí, Querétaro and Puebla, an area known as La Huasteca. Son huasteco is also called huapango. It is played by a trio of musicians: one playing jarana huasteca (a small five-string rhythm guitar), a quinta huapanguera (an eight-string bass guitar) and a violin. The two guitarists sing coplas or short poetry stanzas, alternating verses between them. Two trademarks of this style are improvised violin ornamentations based on a melody and a high falsetto voice. Its origins are in Veracruz and San Luis Potosí but have spread to the rest of the La Huasteca, especially in the state of Hidalgo. It is very popular in the region for major family celebrations such as weddings.

== Son styles in western Mexico ==
Son Jaliscience is the music from which modern mariachi music is derived. This son also relied on the same basic instruments, rhythms and melodies as the sons of Veracruz and other locations, using the same string instruments. By the 19th century, Son Jalisiensce developed to be played with one vihuela, two violins and a guitarrón (which replaced the harp). The best-known song of this type of son is called "La Negra". Modern mariachi developed when brass instruments such as trumpets were added as well as influences from other styles of music.

Chilena music and dance is native to the coastal areas in the states of Guerrero and Oaxaca, which has a large Afro-Mexican community. Local legend has it that the "chilena" music and dance came from people from Chile who came to the shore of Guerrero after their ships were attacked by pirates. The son music from this area was adapted by Oaxaca musician Susana Harp in the 2000s. Traditional chilena songs include "Mariquita María" and "El Santiaguito".

Abajeño music, also known as pirekua, is tied to the Purépecha people. The songs of this style are dedicated to flowers, the countryside, nature, women and life. They are often a mixture of sad and happy. The most traditional way to play the music is with a single guitar and three people but it is more often being played by orchestras and bands. The songs selected often depend on the time of year with songs dedicated to Carnival, Corpus Christi, and other religious festivals.

== See also ==
- Los Soneritos
- Mariachi Charanda
- Regional styles of Mexican music
- Son calentano
- Son de Montón
- Sones de México Ensemble Chicago
- The Girl in White
- Tierra Caliente (music)
