= Los Soneritos =

Mexican folk music and dance group

Los Soneritos is a group dedicated to Mexican folk music and dance, founded in 2005 in Colima by Omar Alejandro Rojas Ramos. Rojas Ramos formed the group while working at a primary school, giving classes in music and dance. It was formed with the express intention of preserving and promoting folk music and dance to youths and children. The group mostly performs music and dance from its home state of Veracruz such as son, fandango and zapateado, but other similar music such as son from the west of Mexico and the “mitote folkorico” is also in the repertoire. Members of the group have done research about traditional music and dance as well as composed their own original pieces.

The performers in the group are young people mostly ranging from age 12 to 16 but members have been as young as seven, or older (21) . These members have included Stefany Reyes Ruiz, Luis Alberto Cisneros Beltrán, Jorge Vladimir Cisneros, Brenda Leticia García, Víctor Benjamín Angulo Cervantes, Leslie Damara Quintero López, Ninfa Fernanda Moreno Rojas and José Armando Rojas Ramos . The group plays various traditional instruments such as the violin, Mexican vihuela, jarana huasteca, requinto, quinta de golpe, marimbol, cajón, guitarrón mexicano, and jawbone and dance over a wooden stage for its sound effects. All the members of the group can play multiple instruments. Despite this versatility, Rojas Ramos says that it has been difficult to expand their repertoire due to lack of funds for traditional instruments and costumes.

They have toured various states in Mexico such as Veracruz, Querétaro, Zacatecas and Jalisco as well as the United States on a tour during April 2011 at Denver, Colorado.. Shortly after they formed they were invited to perform at the VIII Encuentro de Niños Soneros in San Andrés Tuxtla, Veracruz. Since then they have performed at the Teatro del Pueblo of the Feria de Tecomán, the Feria Estatal de Todos Santos, Foro Pablo Silva García at the University of Colima I and II Encuentro de Jaraneros y Decimistas in Orizaba and the IX Encuentro de Niños Soneros de San Andrés Tuxtla. In 2012, they have played at the DominGUIARTE Familiar event at the Silverio Palacio Theater and the Casa de la Cultura, both in the city of Colima .
