= El Son de la Negra =

Song
- Released: 1940
- Recorded: Tepic, Nayarit
- Genre: Mariachi
- Length: 3:01
- Composer: Blas Galindo

"El Son de la Negra" (lit. The Son of the Black Woman) is a Mexican mariachi song in son jalisciense style, originally from Tepic, Nayarit, before its separation from the state of Jalisco, and best known from an adaptation by composer Blas Galindo in 1940 for his suite Sones de mariachi.

The piece was presented for the first time in the city of New York. However, Mexican ethnologist Jesús Jáuregui claims that throughout its history the song has undergone modifications and arrangements that can hardly be attributed to a single author or epoque. The song has become representative of Mexican folk or relative to Mexico worldwide. Jáureguis's more than two decades of research were presented on 15 July 2010 at a conference held in the state of Nayarit under the patronage of the state's Consejo Nacional para la Cultura y las Artes. Among the specific topics discussed were the origin and authorship of the tune, its first recordings, excerpts from Galindo's memoirs, and photographs of older scores and lyrics.

== Lyrics ==
"El Son de la Negra"
Intro sample.

Spanish	English
Negrita de mis pesares, ojos de papel volando. Negrita de mis pesares, ojos de papel volando. A todos diles que sí pero no les digas cuándo. Así me dijiste a mí; por eso vivo penando. ¿Cuándo me traes a mi negra? Que la quiero ver aquí con su rebozo de seda que le traje de Tepic. ¿Cuándo me traes a mi negra? Que la quiero ver aquí con su rebozo de seda que le traje de Tepic.	Black woman of my sorrows, with eyes like flying paper. Black woman of my sorrows, with eyes like flying paper. Say "yes" to everybody but don’t tell them when. That's what you said to me; that's why I live in pain. When will you bring my black woman? Because I want to see her here with her silk rebozo which I brought for her from Tepic. When will you bring my black woman? Because I want to see her here with her silk rebozo which I brought for her from Tepic

== See also ==
- Afro-Mexicans
- Copla (poetry)
- Hemiola
- Son mexicano
