= Mariachi tradicional =

Type of string ensemble from western Mexico

Traditional mariachi is a string ensemble from western Mexico. Unlike the popular mariachi, this ensemble generally does not include trumpets. It consists of violins, guitarra de golpe, vihuelas, harp and guitarrón or double bass, and in some zones a bass drum is used. This mariachi developed from the beginning of 19th century and from this ensemble derived the mariachi with trumpets. Its repertoire generally covered sones abajeños, sones arribeños, sones costeños and jarabes, and a wood box for dancing was widely used. Some groups have been caught performing popular music as well. This ensemble of strings is related with other ensembles of the region, like conjunto calentano, conjunto de arpa grande, conjunto de jaraberos and conjunto de son de tarima of the so-called Mexican son.
