= Son jalisciense =

Variety of Mexican son music

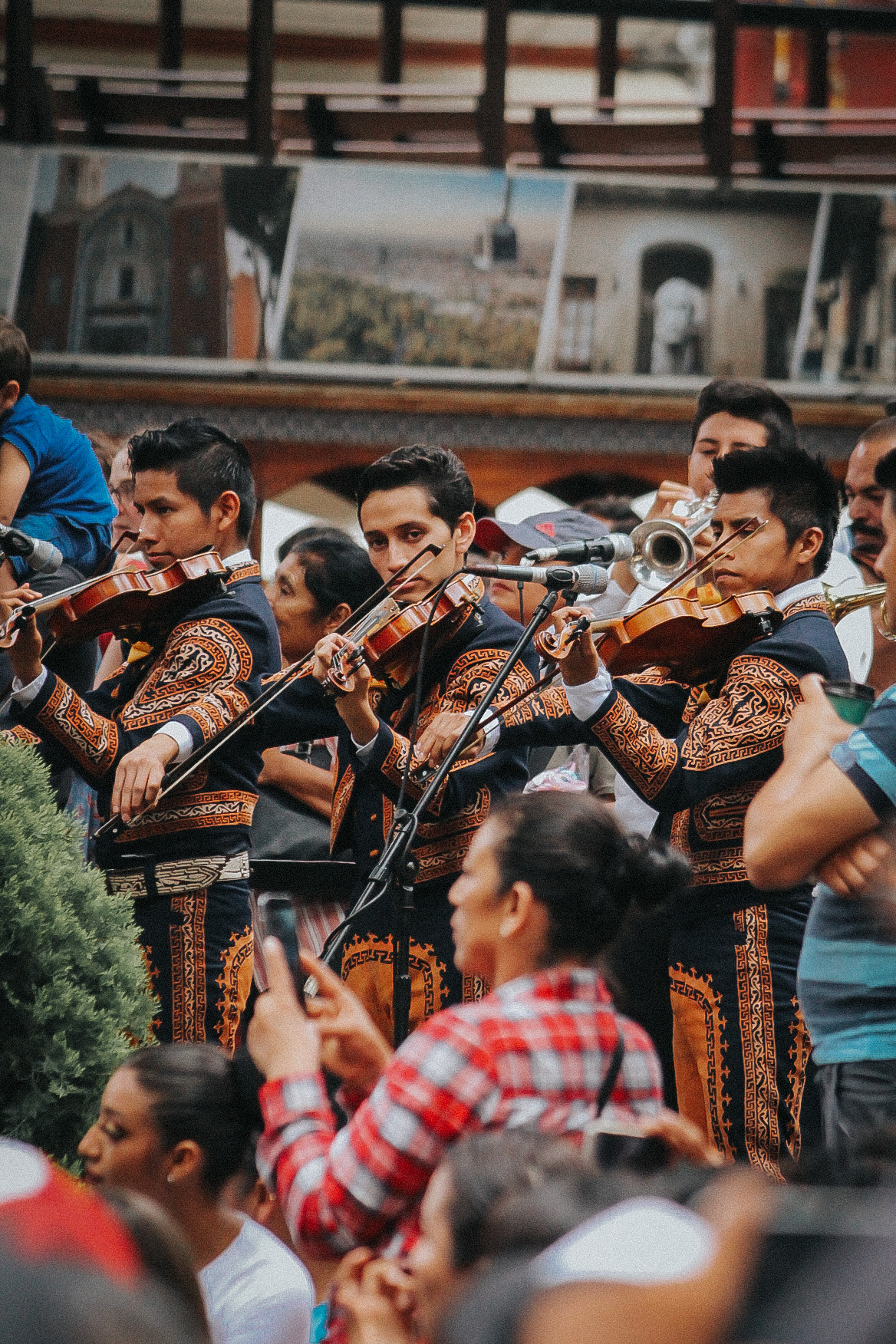
A group of mariachis performing a son jalisciense.

Son jalisciense is a variety of Mexican son music from which much of modern mariachi music is derived. This son relied on the same basic instruments, rhythms and melodies as the sones of Veracruz and the Huasteca regions, using the same string instruments. By the 19th century, Son jalisciense developed to be played with one vihuela, two violins and a guitarrón (which largely replaced the harp). Modern mariachi started to develop when trumpets were added to the ensemble in the 1910's and 1920's, becoming a fixture of the previously all-string genre by the 1930s.

Son jalisciense has both instrumental and vocal songs in this form, mostly in major keys. It is performed by mariachi ensembles. It has an alternating rhythmic pattern in the armonía (vihuela, guitars) and guitarrón. This basic pattern consists of one measure of 6/8 with the next measure of 3/4, known as sesquialtera. The best known song of this type of son is called "La Negra".

== History ==
The early origins of the son jalisciense and other early Mexican sones is not very well documented, as it was mostly an aural and local tradition until the early 20th century. It included rhythmic components that originated in Spain, pre-colonial Mexico, and different Indigenous regions. In the wake of the Spanish colonization of Mexico in the 16th century, they also brought many precursors to modern European instruments. This included winds and strings which were quickly adopted by the native population. According to legend, the genre of son jalisciense originated in the town of Cocula, Jalisco, where the traditional characteristics were solidified in the latter half of the 19th century. It is even believed that the word "mariachi" originated from a now-extinct language of this region.

Following the Mexican Revolution, the prominence of mariachi (and thus the son jalisciense which is a fundamental component of mariachi) began to skyrocket. It became a symbol of national pride, and mariachis became a fixture of government events. It was during this time that the music underwent significant urbanization and standardization. Many of the most successful local groups of musicians, such as Mariachi Vargas de Tecalitlán began migrating to Mexico City. It was here that recording catapulted mariachi to be one of Mexico's most popular forms of art by the 1940s.

Throughout this period the typical size of the group grew, with the addition of trumpets and an increased number of violins, usually meaning three or more. They complemented a rhythm section of vihuela, guitarrón, classical guitar, and harp, which still saw occasional use. The 1950s and 1960s are today regarded as a golden age for the style, as mariachi reached its cultural zenith in Mexico, and many of the most popular and renowned sones were written or recorded during this time. Mariachi Vargas was the most popular and influential mariachi during this time, and their albums from this generation live on as some of the defining mariachi recordings.

In the second half of the 20th century, mariachi began to achieve popularity and mainstay status in the United States as well, due to the increasing number of American citizens with Mexican heritage. The first mariachi group in the US was started by Nati Cano in 1961, and since mariachi has only bloomed as both a cultural and academic interest in the states. Linda Ronstadt's 1987 album Canciones de Mi Padre, which features several sones jaliscienses became a smash hit, further elevating the prominence of the style in the US and Worldwide.

== Characteristics ==
Son jalisciense is defined by its constant rhythm in the armonía, the aforementioned sesquialtera, so-called in reference to the 3:2 ratio between the feeling of the two-halves of the rhythm. The first measure of a typical son jalisciense pattern has a more laid-back 6/8 feel. This contrasts with the driving sensation of the ensuing 3/4 measure to create the push-and-pull rhythmic figure that the genre is known for.

Most sones in this style feature driving and powerful instrumental sections, often contrasting the sweet sound of the violins with the brilliant harsh sound of the trumpets. The majority of sones jaliscienses also often feature vocal sections, with lyrics that depict life in Jalisco and often talk about specific places.

== Examples ==
- El Son de la Negra (1940)
- El Cuatro
- El Pasa Calles
- El Maracumbe
- La Madrugada
- Las Alazanas
- Camino Real de Colima
- El Carretero
- Las Copetonas

== See also ==
- Mariachi
- Mexican son music
- Son calentano
- Son jarocho
- Son huasteco
