= Son del Montón =

Mexican band

Son de Montón is a Mexican band founded in 2004 in Guanajuato, which fuses Mexican traditional music, especially son music and other musical styles with a purpose of bringing traditional music to younger audiences. The members are Ignacio Piñón Pérez, who plays violin, a guitar called a jarana (huasteca and jarocha versions) and quijada, Anatolij Tkatschinski Pérez who plays jarana and quijada, Eduardo Vallejo Torres who plays percussion, Antonio López Cardons who plays jarana and harmonica, Fernanda Aldonza López Cardona, Primo Lara Stephens, Luis Jesús Cibrian García, José Abraham Morales Salazar and sound technician Jacob Sinuee Segoviano Alonzo. Its members come from Veracruz, Sinaloa, Chihuahua and Guanajuato, but the band is based in Guanajuato.

Son del Montón blends Mexican folk music with elements of European and modern music. Mexican folk music is mostly represented by son (jarocho and huasteco) and calentano (from Guerrero) from various parts of Mexico, mostly focusing on the regions of the Sierra Gorda, La Huasteca, the mountainous regions of the Los Tuxtlas in Veracruz as well as areas in Tabasco. European and other foreign influences include jazz, blues, Italian ballad, Cuban son, Flamenco and African rhythms. The son itself is a mix of musical styles including indigenous, African and Spanish. It is the most widely played type of traditional music in Mexico, mostly in rural areas. Much of the fusion of European and African elements come from the Huapango music tradition of Mexico, with much of this musical style preserved by the group as well. Songs representative of this include El Cascabel, La Iguana and El Toro Zacamandú. Son de Montón blending of musical traditions follows that of a band named Afrotumbao, which fused African rhythms with Mexican son music.

The band has played regularly in Mexico City, León and San Miguel de Allende. They have also participated in music festivals, especially those dedicated to son musical traditions. They have also participated in the 2005 and 2011 editions of the Festival Internacional Cervantino. In the first one, they were accompanied by the ballet folklorico group of the University of Guanajuato. They also appeared at the Festival Viva la Banda in 2011 in Guanajuato.
