= The Girl in White (ballet) =

Ballet No. 1 The Girl in White is a contemporary ballet in three acts written by American composer Robert J. Bradshaw. The story is based on Mexican folklore and the music is influenced by Mexican folk music or Mexican Son music. The ballet was commissioned and first recorded by James Ackley and the Palmetto Camerata with funding by a University of South Carolina Provosts’ Research Grant and additional support from two Crowdfunding campaigns through Kickstarter and GoFundMe.

== Synopsis ==
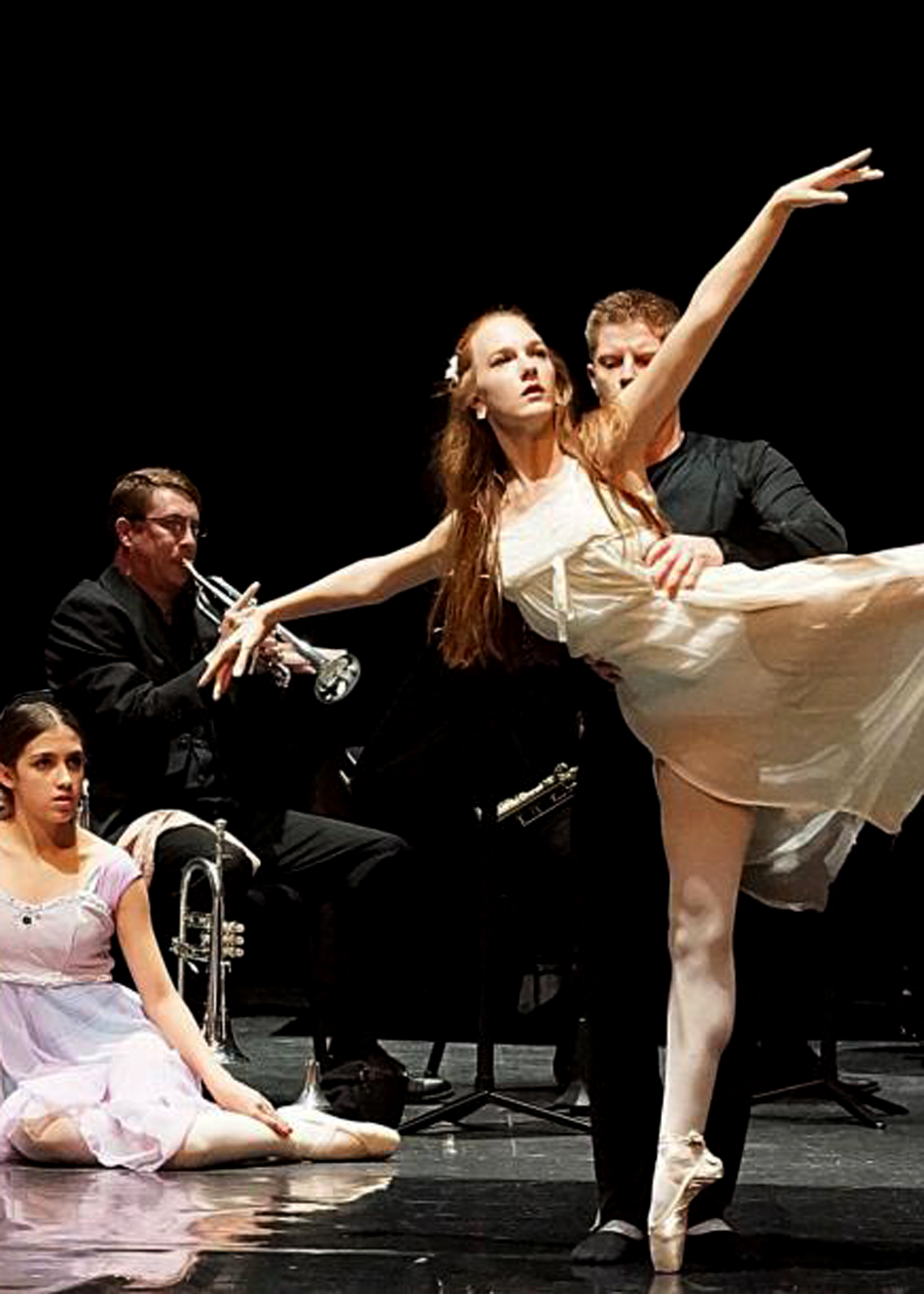
The Girl in White being performed at the 37th Annual Conference of the International Trumpet Guild

Program notes (included in the published score) state:

The Girl in White is the story of a young man, Ambrosio, who learns to love against all odds...even to death. Until The Girl in White appears, Ambrosio is only concerned with the superficial - beautiful clothing, a fancy event, a drink on one side and a beautiful woman on the other. This is love to Ambrosio, but he is mistaken. It will take the loss of everything for him to realize what is important. The Girl in White is loosely based in Mexican folklore. As respected members of the community, Ambrosio and Karime’s arrival at the Grand Fiesta is filled with greetings and honorable bows. However, a strange and beautiful woman in white appears and captures Ambrosio’s attention. Although The Girl in White makes Ambrosio think she is playing hard-to-get, we are unable to ignore the possibility that everything unfolds exactly according to plan.

== Premiere ==
The Girl in White was premiered at the 37th Annual Conference of the International Trumpet Guild by The Columbus Ballet (of Columbus, Georgia) and The Palmetto Camerata. The performance was choreographed by Maria Hirsch of The Columbus Ballet. According to the International Trumpet Guild conference review, “The dancers portrayed the story clearly and with great expression. James Ackley was truly magnificent in his performance on trumpet, as he was showcased as both a technician and lyricist through Bradshaw’s aggressive and seductive score. The members of the Palmetto Camerata cannot go without mention - in particular, the soprano tones of saxophonist Clifford L. Leaman were a perfect match to Ackley throughout.”

== Modern dance version ==
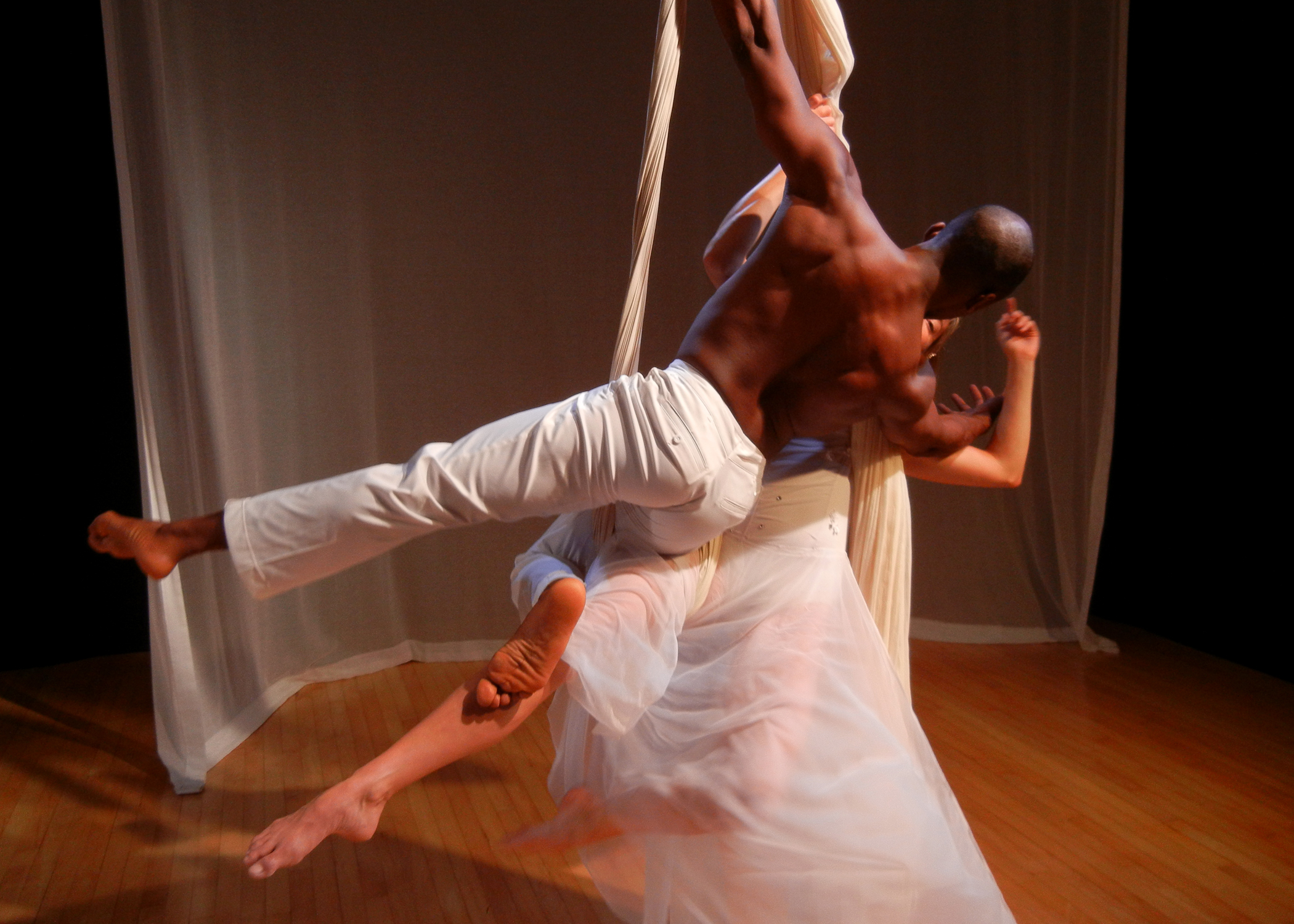
Ipswich Moving Company, The Girl in White, final scene

The Girl in White was filmed as a modern dance by the Ipswich Moving Company on August 30 and 31, 2012. The performance was choreographed by Janet Taisey Craft, with lighting by Sandra Galley, and costumes by Tyler Kinney. The ballet was performed to a recording made by The Palmetto Camerata.

The Girl in White was premiered onstage in modern dance on April 4, 5 and 6, 2014 at Indiana University of Pennsylvania through a collaboration between the IUP Department of Music and the IUP Department of Theater and Dance. The production was codirected by Holly Boda-Sutton and Kevin Eisensmith in collaboration with the composer, Robert J. Bradshaw.

== First audio recording ==
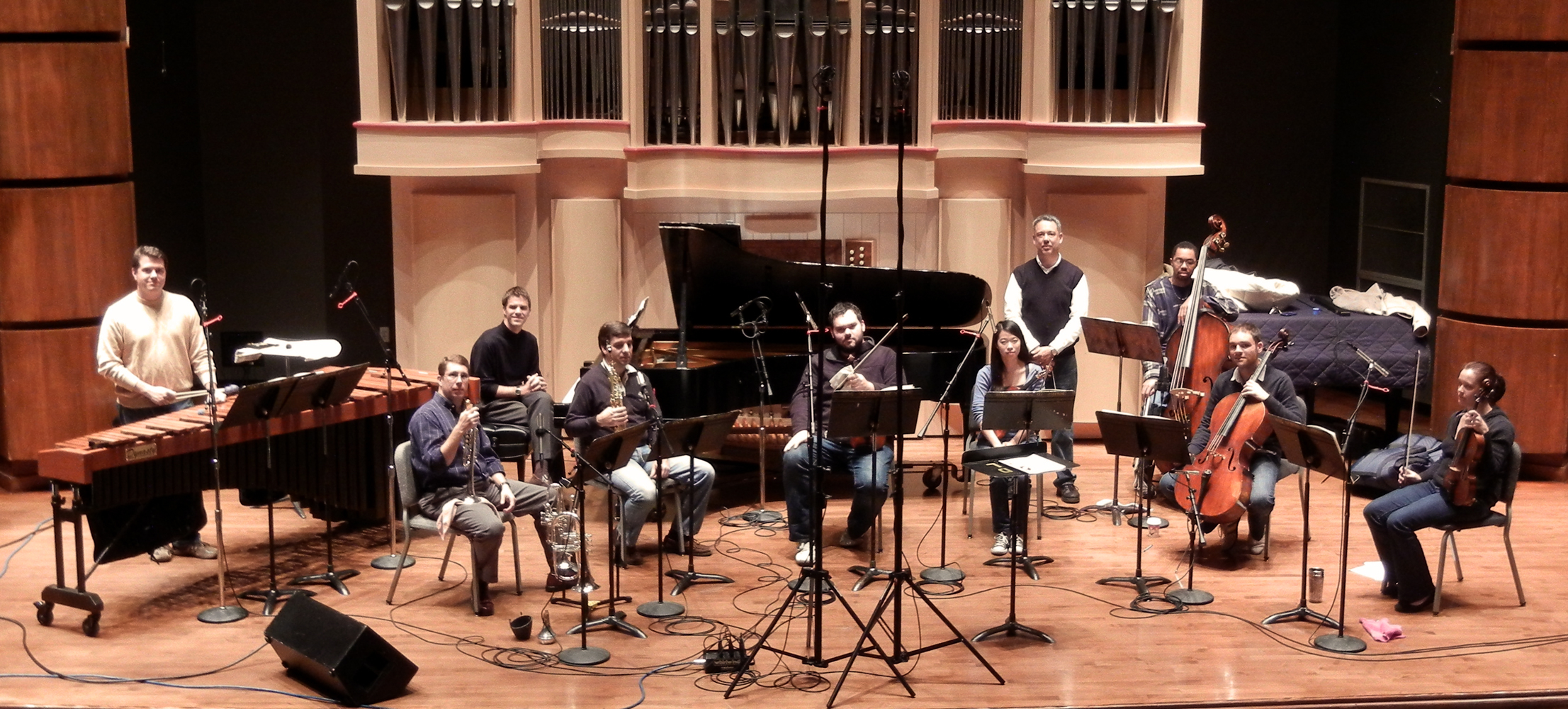
The Palmetto Camerata recording The Girl in White

The Girl in White was recorded by the Palmetto Camerata at the University of South Carolina (January, 5 & 6, 2012) and released by Beauport Classical (BC41213) on CD in 2012.

The American Record Guide review of the CD states:

In a short overture piano, marimba, and strings open mysteriously; but the music is whirling by the end. The ballet then proceeds through three scenes, each with four short pieces. The music is beautiful, evocative, mysterious, sensuous, and sometimes frenzied. Bradshaw’s melodies are supple, his tonal harmonic language is often dissonant but never jarring.”

Instrument	Musician
Trumpet	James Ackley
Soprano Saxophone	Clifford L. Leaman
Percussion	Scott Herring
Piano	Joseph Rackers
Violin I	Micah Gangwer
Violin II	Shrhan Wu
Viola	Rachel Sanders
Cello	Dusan Vukajlovic
Bass	Jonathan Burns
Conductor	Various

== Collaboration history ==
Bradshaw and Ackley began collaborating in 2004 with the premiere of “Sonata” for trumpet and piano. Their collaboration continued with the opera .Gabriel, where trumpet performs as one of the main characters. The opera was recorded by Ackley and The Palmetto Camerata and premiered at the 35th Annual Conference of the International Trumpet Guild, courtesy of Opera Australia in 2010. Ackley has referred to Bradshaw's music as “unmistakably American, with a mixture of jazz and rock rhythms superimposed over fanciful melodies that ring true for the audience”

== See also ==
- Ballet music
- History of ballet
- List of ballets by title

== Sources ==
- American Record Guide journal website
- LivelyArts (published 3/28/14)
- New American Works for Trumpet CD Art (Beauport Classical Release BC41213)
- University of South Carolina Office of the Provost Internal Grant Programs Awardees: 2011 Creative and Performing Arts Awardees (James Ackley, Music-School of Music, Recording of Newly Composed American Trumpet Music)
- Beauport Press Music Publications: The Girl in White Score
- International Trumpet Guild conference coverage (The Girl in White, May 23, 2012, pg.6)
- International Trumpet Guild conference coverage (.Gabriel, July 8, 2010, pg.5)
- International Trumpet Guild conference coverage (Sonata, June 17, 2004)
- Ledger-Enquirer article
- Video of the Ipswich Moving Company performing “The Girl in White”
- Beauport Classical website (CD publisher)
- “Mexican folklore brought to stage”, Indiana Gazette (published April 1, 2014)
- “Old Art form takes on modern topic”, Gloucester Times (published February 23, 2011)
- Behind the Scenes: The Sonata for trumpet and strings (or piano) Premiere Project Article (publish by Beauport Press
- The Columbus Ballet website (History)
