= Mariachi =

Folk music from Mexico

- Mariachi band performing "La Bikina"
- Stylistic origins: Son jalisciense; son planeco; Mexican folk music; Spain folk music
- Cultural origins: 18th century, Cocula, Jalisco, Mexico (Jalisco, Colima, Michoacán, Nayarit)

Subgenres
- Mariachi tradicional

Regional scenes
- Mexico; Colombia; Costa Rica; Ecuador; Chile; Guatemala; Peru; United States; Venezuela; Argentina; El Salvador; Paraguay

Other topics
- Charros; Jarabe Tapatío; Plaza Garibaldi; Regional Mexican music

Mariachi, string music, song and trumpet
- UNESCO Intangible Cultural Heritage
- Country: Mexico
- Reference: 00575
- Region: Latin America and the Caribbean

Inscription history
- Inscription: 2011 (6th session)
- List: Representative

Mariachi (US: /ˌmɑːriˈɑːtʃi/, UK: /ˌmær-/, Spanish: [maˈɾiaʧi]) is a genre of regional Mexican music dating back to at least the 18th century, evolving over time in the countryside of various regions of western Mexico. The usual mariachi group today consists of as many as eight violins, two trumpets and at least one guitar, including a high-pitched Mexican Vihuela and an acoustic bass guitar called a guitarrón, and all players take turns singing lead and doing backup vocals.

During the 19th- and 20th-century migrations from rural areas into Guadalajara, along with the Mexican government's promotion of national culture, mariachi came to be recognized as a distinctly Mexican son. Modifications of the music include influences from other music, such as polkas and waltzes, the addition of trumpets, and the use of charro outfits by mariachi musicians. The musical style began to take on national prominence in the first half of the 20th century, with its promotion at presidential inaugurations and on the radio in the 1920s. In 2011, UNESCO recognized mariachi as an Intangible Cultural Heritage; it joins six other entries on the Mexican list.

Song genres performed by mariachi ensembles include rancheras, corridos, cumbias, boleros, ballads, sones, huapangos, jarabes, danzones, joropos, pasodobles, marches, polkas, waltzes and chotís. Most song lyrics are about machismo, love, betrayal, death, politics, revolutionary heroes, and country life.

== Name ==
The origin of the word is disputed, but prominent theories attribute it to deep roots. One states that it comes from the name of the wood used to make the dance platform. Another states that mariachi comes from the indigenous name of a tree called pilla or cirimo; yet another states that it came from an image locally called María H (pronounced Mari-Ache).

While the term mariachi is commonly used, ranchera music (literally "music from the ranch") is used to refer to it traditionally.

The oldest references to mariachi documented are more than 100 certificates of baptisms, burials and marriages in which the Mariachi ranch appears, between 1832 and 1850. It was located near the river Santiago, in Nayarit.

The word mariachi was once thought to have derived from the French word mariage ('marriage'), dating from the French intervention in Mexico in the 1860s, related to the music's appearance at weddings. This was a common explanation on record jackets and travel brochures but was disproven with the appearance of documents that showed that the word existed before this invasion: In 1981, a letter written by Catholic priest Cosme Santa Ana to the archbishop in 1852 was discovered in the archives of a church, where he complains about the noise as well as the drinking and gambling antics of the "mariachis," long before the French occupation. Cora Indians that might have come from the state Jalisco, Mexico had a similar word that was used to describe a type of wood used for mariachi instruments.

== Origins ==
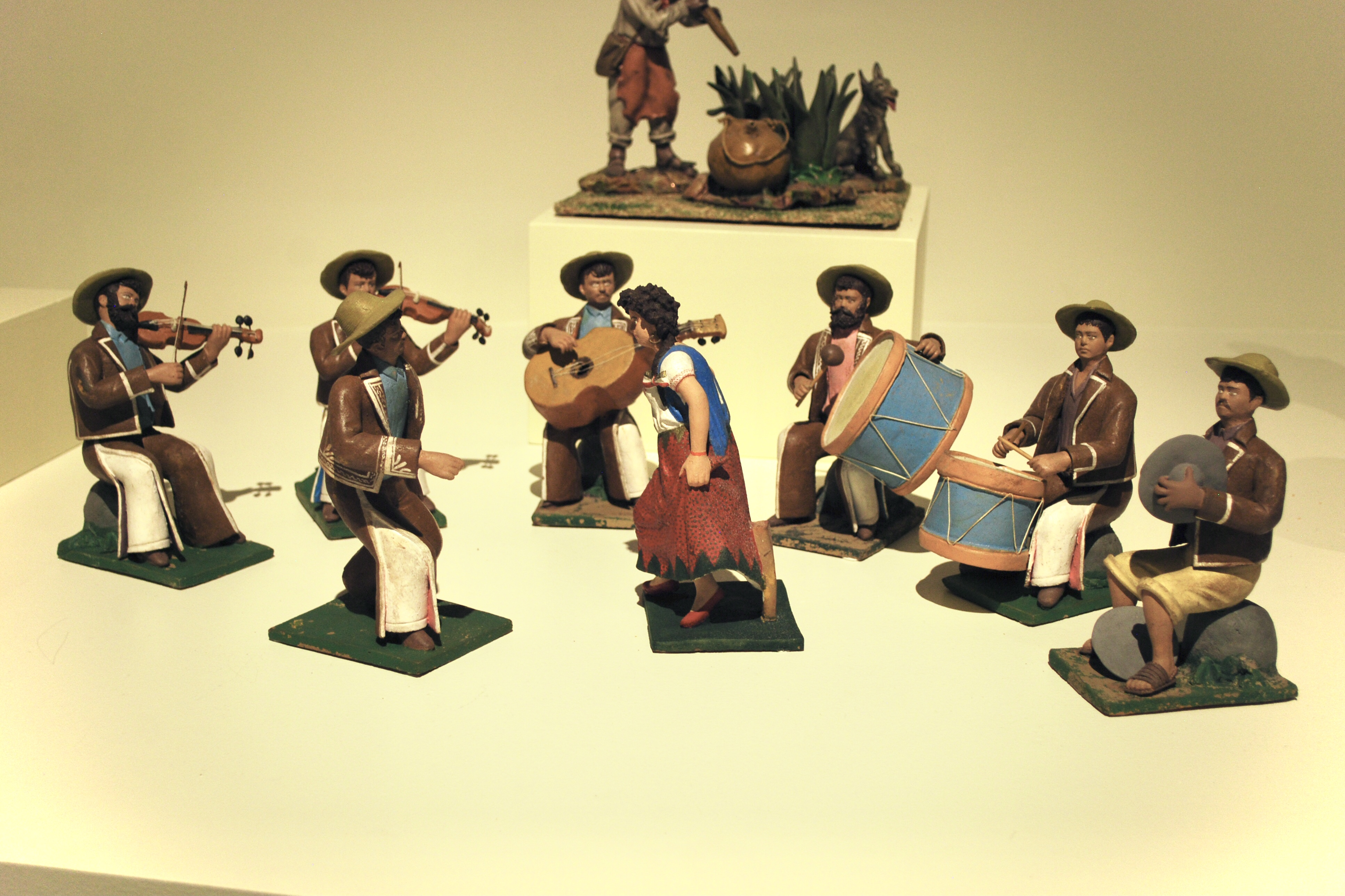
Figures depicting an old-style mariachi band in clay by José Guadalupe Panduro of Tonalá, Jalisco, on display at the Museo de Arte Popular in Mexico City

Prior to the arrival of the Spanish, indigenous music in Mexico was played with rattles, drums, flutes, and conch-shell horns as part of religious celebrations. The Spanish introduced violins, guitars, harps, brass instruments, and woodwinds, which mostly replaced native instruments. The Europeans introduced their instruments to use during Mass, but they were quickly adapted to secular events. Indigenous and mestizo peoples learned to play and make these instruments, often giving them modified shapes and tunings.

In addition to instruments, the Spanish introduced the concept of musical ensembles—which, in the colonial period, generally consisted of two violins, a harp, and various guitars. These groups were based upon mestizaje culture and gave rise to a number of folk musical styles in Mexico.

One of these folk musical styles was the son. This music featured string instruments. Son music divided into various regional varieties; the variety popular in the Jalisco area was called son jalisciense, whose best known song, also referred to as "the mariachi national anthem," is "La Negra". Modern mariachi music developed from this son style, with mariachi as an alternative name for son jalisciense. Early mariachi players did not look like those of today; they played only string instruments such as guitars and harps and dressed in typical peasant clothing: white pants and shirts with huarache sandals. Those who could play the son jalisciense/mariachi music could find work at haciendas at a higher rate than those who could not.

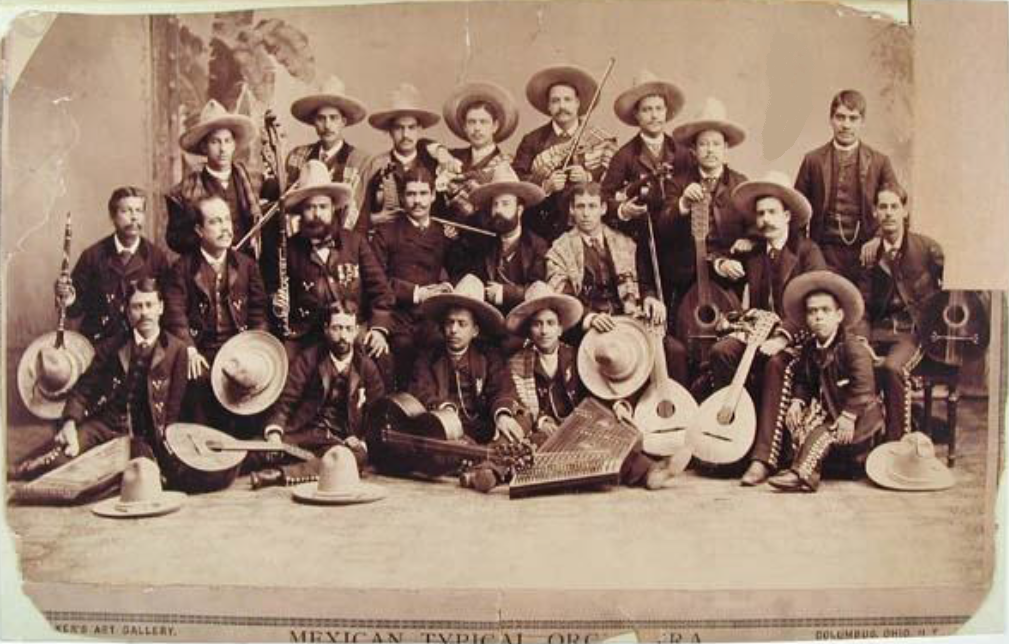
The Orquestra Típica Mexicana led by Carlo Curti in Columbus, Ohio, 1885

The distinction of mariachi from the older son jalisciense occurred slowly sometime during the 19th century. The music originated in the center-west of Mexico. Most claims for its origin lie in the state of Jalisco but neighboring states of Colima, Nayarit, and Michoacán have also claimed it.

Most sources agree that the modern mariachi originated in the town of Cocula, Jalisco, during the 19th century, where the genre evolved from the older son jalisciense and became culturally centered in Jalisco by the late 1800s. Cocula, known as the "Cuna Mundial del Mariachi" ("World Cradle of Mariachi"), commemorates this heritage with a plaza arch bearing that title.

The song “De Cocula es el Mariachi," composed by Manuel Esperón (music) and Ernesto Cortázar (lyrics) and popularized by Jorge Negrete, further reinforced Cocula's association with the genre. The Museo de Cocula es el Mariachi, inaugurated on 31 December 2000 in the historic Casa de los Juzgados, exhibits instruments, costumes, and photographs documenting the evolution of mariachi and its role as a symbol of Mexican cultural identity.

The distinction between son and modern mariachi comes from the modification of the music. By the end of the nineteenth century, the European art music tradition was firmly transplanted to Mexico, with opera, salon music, waltzes, and more written and performed both by Europeans and Mexicans in the country. One variety was the salon orchestras called orquestas típicas that performed in more rural settings, notably in traje de charro outfits. This use of the traje de charro outfit was repeated with urban mariachi in the 1920s.

The traje de charro outfit is widely considered to be one of the two major changes that occurred during the Golden Age, the other being the introduction of trumpets. The traje de charro outfit was also used in the national Orquestra Típica Mexicana ("Mexican Typical Orchestra"), organized in 1884 by Carlo Curti, and touring the United States and Mexico as part of a presentation of nationalism for the Mexican president Porfirio Diaz. Curti's Orquestra Típica Mexicana has been called the "predecessor of the mariachi bands". Traje de charro is heavily inspired by cowboys and features very symbolic sombreros, tight fitting pants, ruffled shirts, and jackets with heavy embroidery and embellishments throughout all the pieces.

After the Mexican Revolution, many haciendas had to let workers go, including mariachis. Groups began to wander and play for a fee, which obliged them to incorporate other music into their repertoires, including waltzes and polkas. It also required them to play in public venues. From the late 19th century to the 1930s, mariachi groups were semi-professional.

In the early 20th-century United States, record companies began actively recording rural music in other parts of the world. One of these was a recording called Cuarteto Coculense by Columbia, Edison and Victor in 1908 and 1909, recognized as one of the "first" mariachi recordings. The music also gained attention in Mexico City when a wealthy hacienda family brought an early mariachi from Cocula to play for President Porfirio Díaz in 1905.

== Modern development ==
Mariachi band performing El Son de la Negra at the Xochimilco canals.

The common perception of the music and look of mariachi developed in the 20th century, as the music was transformed from a regional rural folk music to an urban phenomenon that came to represent Mexico.

The music was first introduced to Mexico City in 1905. During this time, many farm workers moved to the city, including those from Jalisco, which settled around Plaza Garibaldi. These mariachi musicians developed new practices, such as performances in plazas and restaurants. However, it also continued its more traditional venues such as serenades, and performances at major family events.

During this time, the Mexican government was heavily involved in cultural promotion as a way to create a unified Mexican identity after the end of the Mexican Revolution. One of these efforts was the promotion of mariachi as an international symbol of Mexican identity, first with radio and sound recordings and later with films.

Mexico built a nationwide radio broadcasting network in the 1920s such as XEB and XEW, which began broadcasting mariachi music as a media production, rather than as a music for social events. This music was already being modified in part due to the advent of sound recording. For example, most son jaliscense songs were longer than the standard three-and-a-half minutes of the then-standard 78 rpm record, forcing the shortening of tunes. Around the same time, the popularity of jazz and Cuban music introduced the trumpet into mariachi, pushing the violins into a secondary role, and in some cases, replacing the harp.

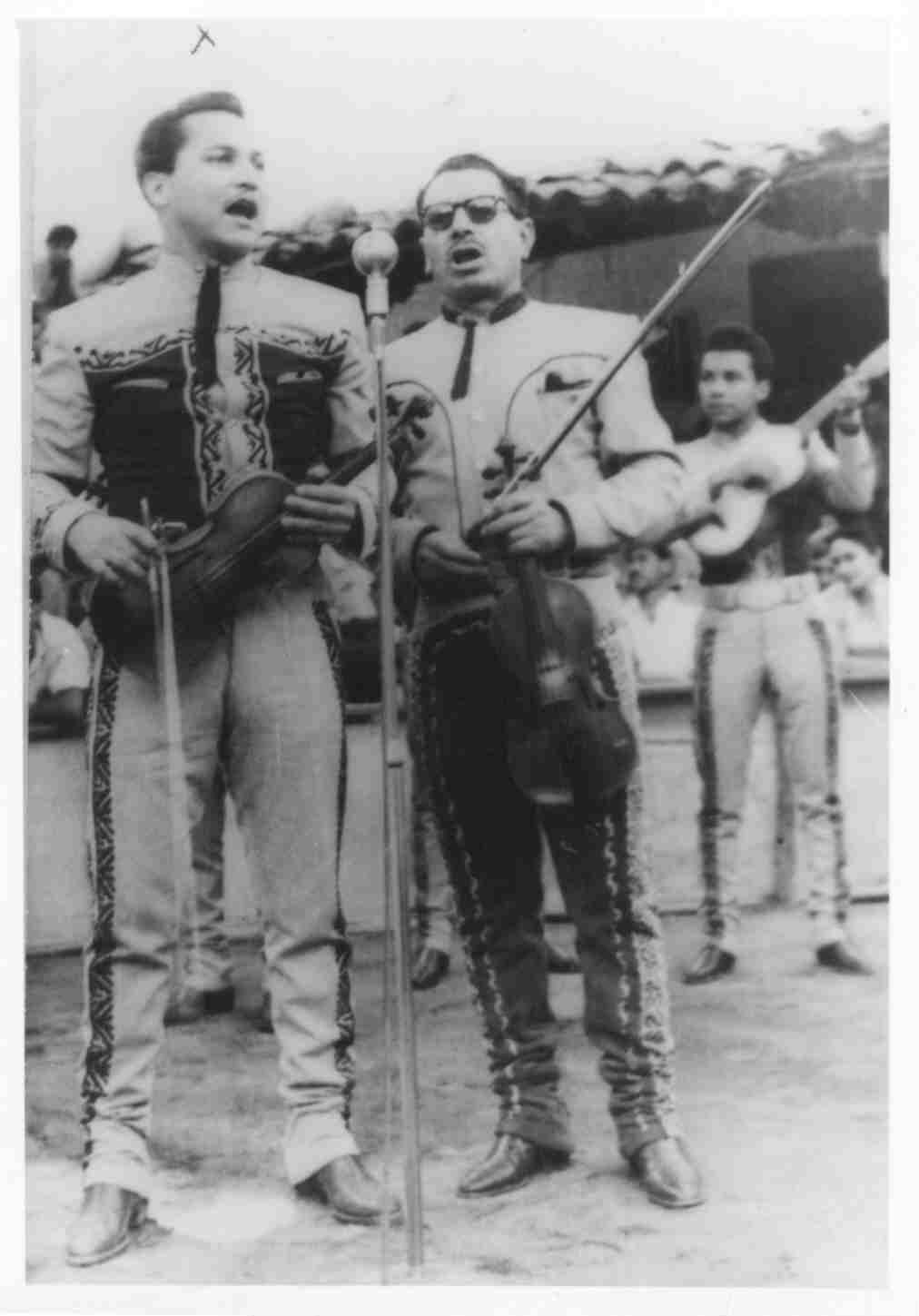
Mario Santiago and Silvestre Vargas in a musical presentation, 1958–1959

The most prized of the mariachis remained those from the state of Jalisco, particularly the areas of Cocula and Tecalitlán. They represented Mexico to the people during the Independence Day celebrations in Mexico City in 1933 as well as during Lázaro Cárdenas' election campaign in 1936.

The charro tradition was strong in Jalisco, especially in a region called Los Altos. After the Revolution, the charreada became a national sport in Mexico and rings were constructed specifically for them, followed by professional charro associations. With the breakup of the large haciendas, charros were no longer economically necessary but were used as a cultural ideal, especially by the film industry in the mid-20th century. The first charro movies date from the 1920s, but the first to sing mariachi was Tito Guízar in Allá en el Rancho Grande in 1936. The character was played by Jorge Negrete in films such as ¡Ay, Jalisco... no te rajes! and ¡Así se quiere en Jalisco! The main characters used his ability to sing mariachi as a way to show strength, virility, and aesthetic beauty. Its use in film also made the music popular and a symbol of ethnic pride for Mexican Americans in the United States.

However, these films also promoted a negative perception of mariachi music. During the early 20th century, mariachi was seen as lower class, and belonging in bars. Films from this period associated the charros and mariachi music with machismo, womanizing and drinking, especially of tequila. This perception would change in the latter half of the 20th century, but the music remains strongly associated with tequila.

Mariachi music and musicians became more professional with more formal training starting in the late 1940s and early 1950s, principally due to the success of a major mariachi by the name of Mariachi Vargas. Their appearance in many films, backing many singing stars, and their hiring of formal musicians prompted other mariachis to do the same. The group also expanded, adding trumpets, violins and even a classical guitar to become a kind of orchestra, keeping the traditional son/mariachi base while integrating new musical ideas and styles. Arrangers like Rubén Fuentes incorporated classical influence. One other innovation, in contrast to the machismo of the style, were the first female mariachi performers, Lola Beltrán and Lucha Villa. One night Mariachi Vargas put Beltrán on stage when she was a teenager. Her versions of "Cucurrucucu Paloma" and "Tres Dias" are now considered classics.

Many of the traditional sounds of Cocula were lost as mariachi groups incorporated other musical styles that were popular on the radio. New influences have come into the tradition from the Mexican American community in the United States. In both countries, however, the learning of traditional pieces and repertory is still stressed to form a base.

The International Mariachi Festival in Guadalajara is an annual ten-day event that attracts more than 500 mariachis, who perform in concert halls and city streets. Past performers include Mariachi Vargas de Tecalitlán, Mariachi los Camperos (led by Nati Cano) and Mariachi América de Jesús Rodríguez de Hijar.

In Mexico City, the center of mariachi music remains Garibaldi Plaza. Mariachi musicians fill the plaza to solicit gigs, from individual songs for passers-by to being hired for events such as weddings and baptisms. They even stand on Eje Central in front of the plaza to flag down passing cars. In 2010, the government renovated the plaza to make it more tourist-friendly, adding new paving, gardens, police, security cameras, painted facades, and a museum dedicated to mariachi and tequila. Although mariachis can be hired in Mexico City over the phone or on the internet, many people still prefer to come to the plaza, hear the musicians and haggle over the price. About 2,500 mariachis hold union cards to work in the plaza, but as many as 4,000 may circulate through on a busy weekend.

== Groups ==
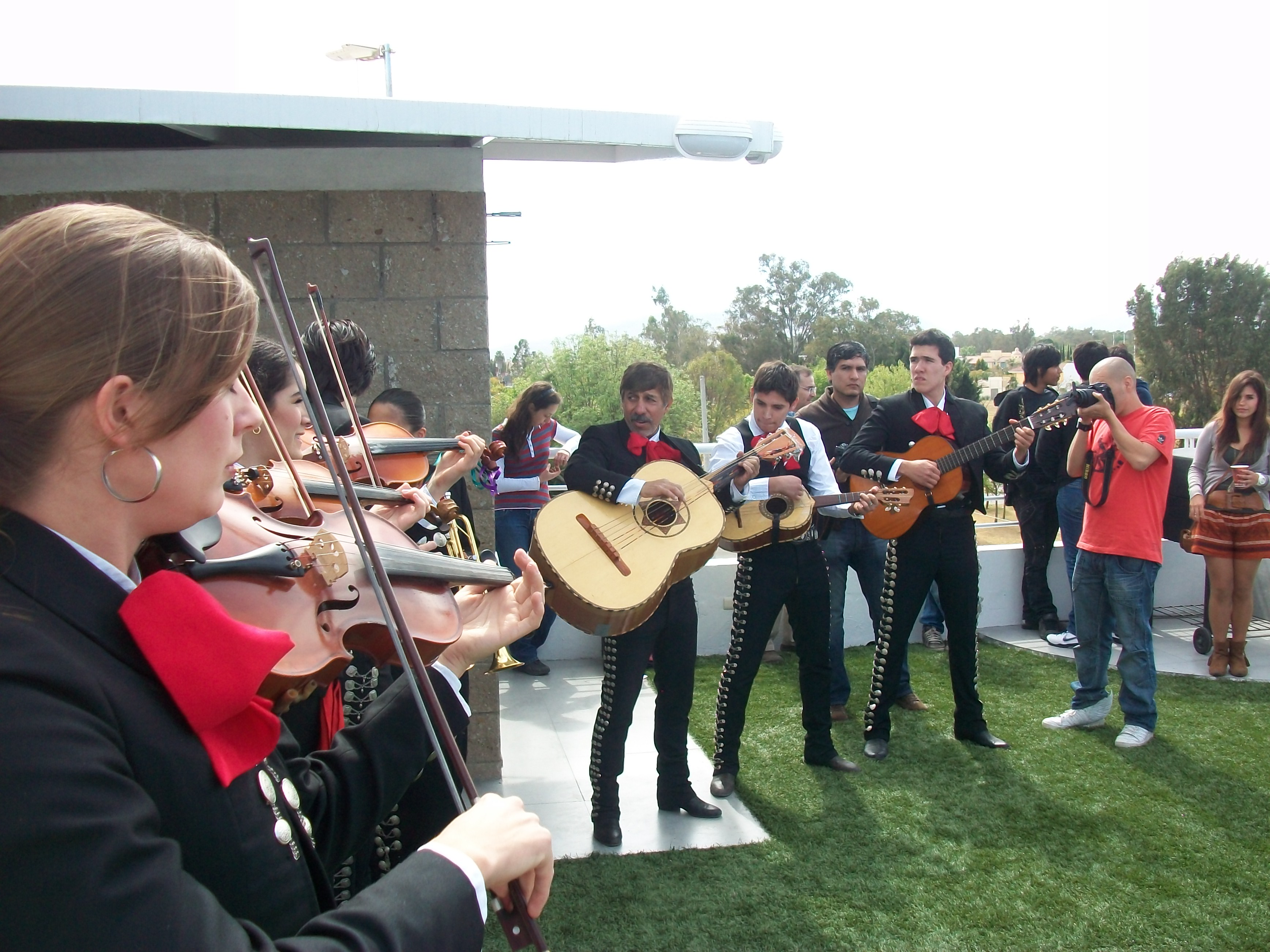
Mariachi group playing at the 10th-anniversary celebration of Wikipedia in Guadalajara

The size of a mariachi group varies depending on the availability of musicians. The usual mariachi group today consists of as many as eight violins, two trumpets and at least one guitar. Traditional mariachi guitars include the vihuela, a high-pitched, round-backed guitar that provides rhythm, and a bass guitar called a guitarrón, which also provides rhythm. Sometimes a Mexican folk harp provides bass and ornaments the melody. All are Mexican variations of European instruments. There is generally no lead singer as in other kinds of groups, with all players singing choruses and taking turns singing the lead. Often the lead singer is assigned to a certain song due to voice qualities. Mariachi vocalization shows influences from a number of styles such as bolero (a romantic style), huapango (using falsetto), son jalisciense (an aggressive style) and more. Voices must be strong to be heard over amplified instruments. Vocal style emphasizes operatic qualities, and instrumental performance demonstrates a level of virtuosity that reflects advanced musical training. Historically, mariachi groups have been made up of men, but there is growing acceptance of female mariachis.

As mariachi groups are expected to play requests, they may need to know hundreds of songs. Most songs are about machismo, love, betrayal, death, politics, revolutionary heroes and even animals and country life from the genre's origins as rural son music. One particularly famous song is "La Cucaracha" ("The Cockroach").

Most mariachi groups are associated with family and religious celebrations along with serenades. A serenade in the Mexican culture is used to profess your love or show admiration for a person. Mariachis are most widely known to serenade during birthday celebrations. One of the most common pieces played by mariachis is "Las Mañanitas", for birthdays and celebrations of patron saints.

In Mexico, mariachi music can also be found as part of Catholic Mass. The Misa panamericana is a mariachi folk mass sung in Spanish with new arrangements of classic hymns such as "Kyrie Eleison". This innovation began in 1966 by Canadian priest Jean Marc Leclerc and it moved from a small church in Cuernacava in the 1960s to the Cuernavaca Cathedral. Mariachi mass grew because it was heavily involved in community, and was spurred onwards by the Chicano movement, spreading from Mexico to the United States and onwards.

== Mariachi Vargas ==
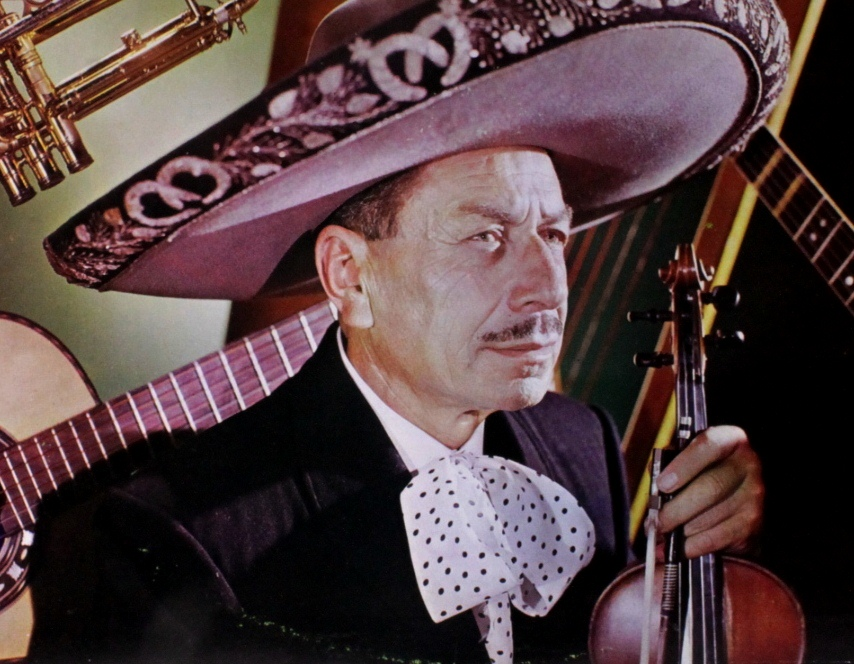
Silvestre Vargas (1901–1985), violinist and musician of the Mariachi Vargas from 1921 to 1975, director from 1931 to 1955

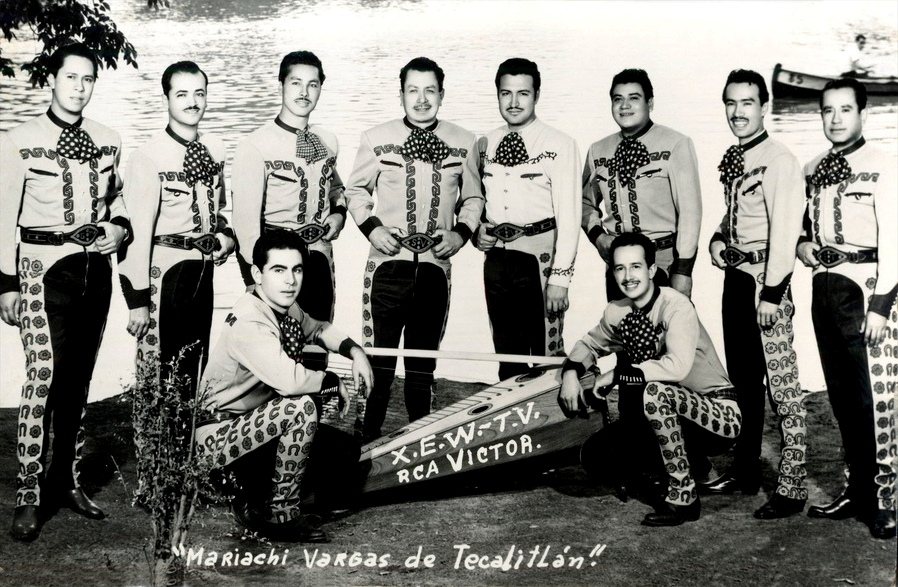
Mariachi Vargas in 1950

Mariachi Vargas de Tecalitlán is recognized as the oldest mariachi ensemble, founded by Gaspar Vargas in the late 1890s. They moved from Jalisco to Mexico City and performed for the inauguration of President Lázaro Cárdenas. Mariachi Vargas became famous accompanying singers such as Luis Miguel, Lola Beltrán, and Pedro Infante. Mariachi Vargas's first recording was in 1937, the same year they appeared in Asi es mi Tierra. They appeared in over 200 films in the 20th century. Silvestre Vargas took over Mariachi Vargas de Tecalitlán from his father in 1958 and soon after hired a trained musician, Ruben Fuentes, as musical director. Fuentes along with Vargas were instrumental in the standardization of much of mariachi music, arranging traditional songs and writing new ones that would be performed by many of the legendary performers of the mid-20th century, such as Pedro Infante, Miguel Aceves Mejía, Lola Beltrán and José Alfredo Jiménez. Mariachi Vargas still remains, tracing its history in terms of generations, starting in the 1890s, with these generations maintaining the group's authenticity as a mariachi while the music has evolved. The last Vargas associated with the group died in 1985. That the group still considers itself the original group comes from the notion of passing on the music by generations of musicians, as the original son jaliscense was learned.

== United States and further afield ==
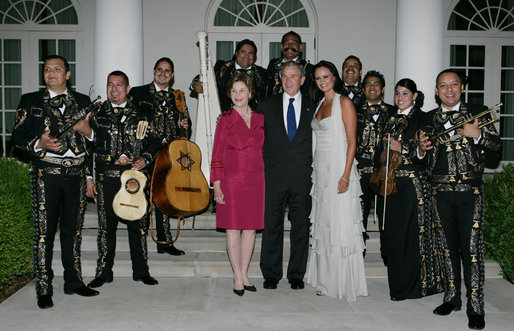
George and Laura Bush at the White House with Mariachi Campanas de América

Regional Mexican radio stations in the United States include mariachi music in their programming. The most popular Latin music format in the US, the music style is well recognized throughout the country. The United States military has an official mariachi band in the New Mexico National Guard, called Mariachi Nuevo México; this pays homage to the state of New Mexico's Hispano and Mexican-American heritage.

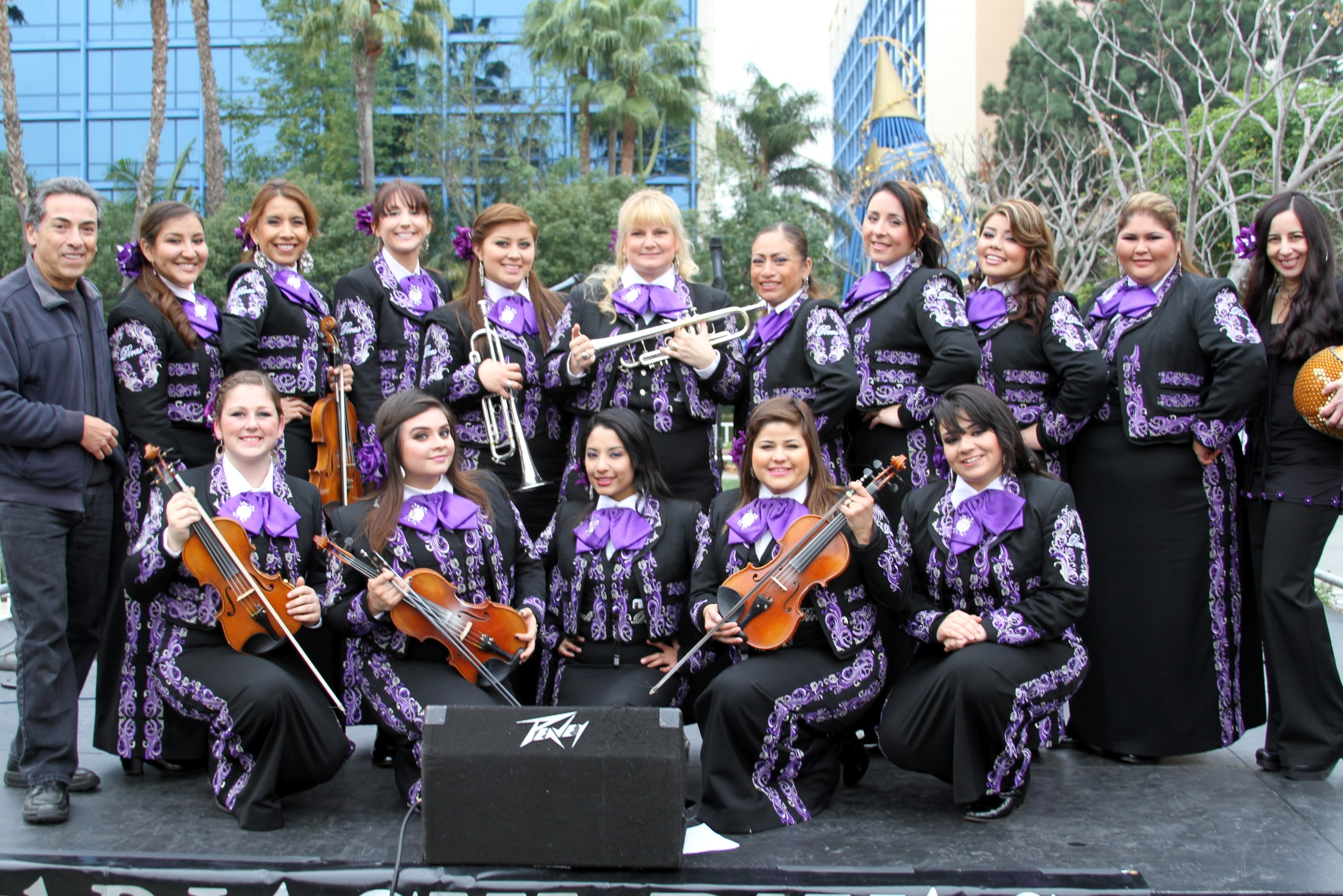
The Mariachi Divas de Cindy Shea is an all-female Mariachi based in Los Angeles, California, founded in 1999 by Cindy Shea. In 2009, they became the first all-female mariachi nominated for a Grammy Award, and the first to win one. As of 2014, the mariachi has been nominated for five Grammy awards, winning twice. They are the official Mariachi of the Disneyland resort.

The promotion of mariachi as representative of Mexico has led to the formation of mariachi groups in many countries such as Argentina, Aruba, Egypt, Chile, Cuba, Spain, Guatemala, Uruguay, Peru, Brazil, Colombia, Ecuador and Venezuela, with groups from these and other countries participating in Guadalajara's International Mariachi and Charreria Conference.

The music has a strong following in the US, with top groups spending a lot of time on tour. Mariachi Los Camperos received a Grammy nomination for best Mexican-American album. Academic programs allow for instruction by famous mariachi groups and the opportunity to win awards.

The first mariachi groups in the United States were from California. Nati Cano was born in Jalisco in 1939 and moved to Los Angeles in 1959. He played in many mariachi groups backing singers but felt mariachi could stand alone. In 1969 he opened a restaurant called La Fonda in Los Angeles, which featured his group, Los Camperos, as part of a dinner show. The success of this enterprise, and of Los Camperos in general, have inspired many mariachi groups in the United States. In the late 1980s, pop star Linda Ronstadt recorded "Canciones de Mi Padre" and "Más Canciones" with Mariachi Vargas de Tecalitlán and others, which helped promote its popularity among Mexican Americans and to non-Mexican Americans.

Some U.S. public schools offer mariachi as part of classes. The first student mariachi group was begun in 1961 at the University of California, Los Angeles. This prompted the creation of other student organizations in other parts of California and then in Texas, where the first mariachi festival was held in 1979. Since then, a strong synergy between academic programs and mariachi festivals has developed, which feature students and give mariachi classes and workshops. This festival led to excitement in the Texas board of education, and soon Zeke Castro, a many award-winning educator, was hired to teach mariachi.

Once school programs were limited to border areas such as San Antonio and Tucson, but they have spread across the southwest and into other parts of the United States, especially since the 1990s. There are at least 500 schools offering classes along with local and state competitions. In some US schools, mariachi ensembles have replaced school bands. Professional groups such as Mariachi Cobre, which regularly performs at Disney World, also spend time teaching in public schools.

In areas with large Mexican-American populations, mariachis are hired for events outside this ethnic group as well. Outside of schools, the most important venue for the music in the United States is mariachi festivals, with the longest-running festivals in Tucson and Fresno. The Tucson International Mariachi Conference began in 1982 and showcases over 500 elementary, middle, and high schools and college mariachi players. The Las Vegas International Mariachi Festival, established in 1991, is televised on Telemundo and PBS and has headlined artists such as Pedro Fernández, Ana Gabriel, American-born mariachi singer Pepe Aguilar and more.

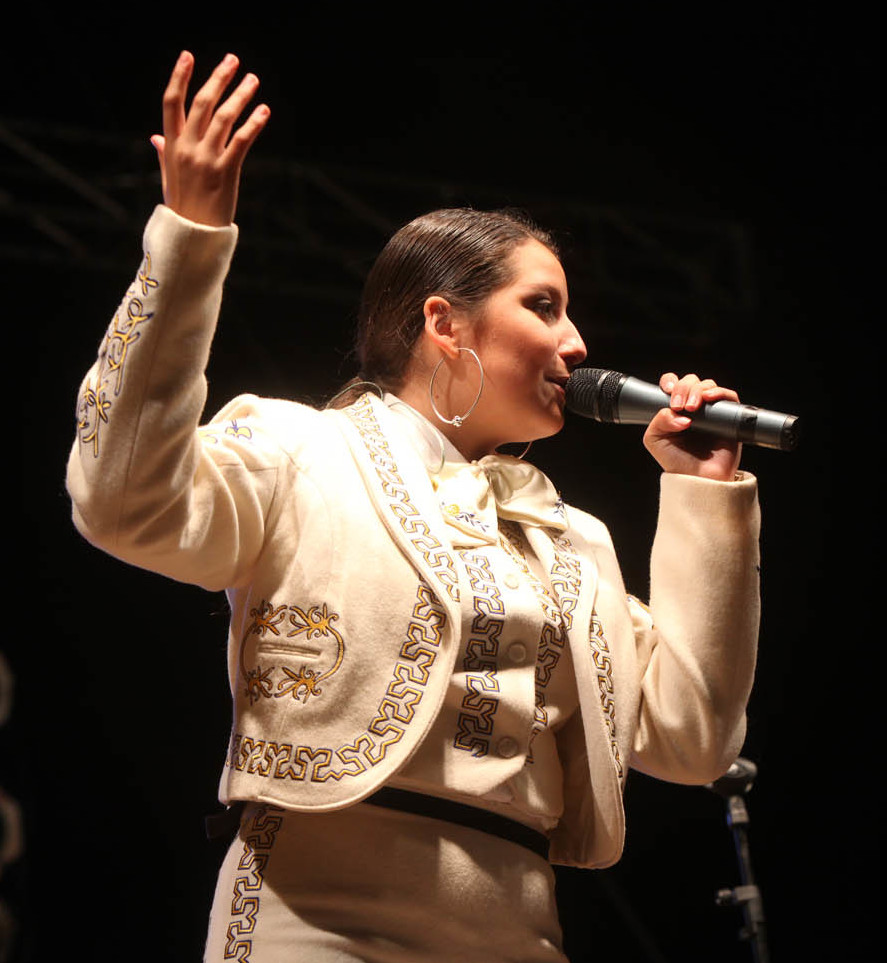
María José Quintanilla, a Chilean singer of ranchera

The educational movement is controversial with some trained in the traditional manner, who are skeptical about these programs and their potential to change the tradition. The changes, especially standardization of publishing, are slowly impacting mariachi in Mexico. One difficulty of arranging mariachi pieces is that the son jaliscense that mariachi is based on alternates between 3/4 and 6/8 time. Much of the published mariachi music is meant for people already familiar with the music to serve as guides, not for novices. On the other hand, many schools have problems recruiting mariachi instructors as many of these do not have required teaching credentials. For this reason, schools often hire trained musicians from outside the mariachi tradition. Many traditional mariachis are concerned that standardization will lead to the genre becoming rule-bound and so restrict improvisation.

Other innovations in the United States have been the incorporation of styles of artists such as Elvis Presley, Freddy Fender, Glenn Miller, Marty Robbins, and Johnny Cash, as well as the heavy-metal mariachi band Metalachi. Another is the encouragement of female mariachis, including all-female mariachi groups such as Mariachi Mujer 2000, Mariachi Reyna de Los Angeles and Mariachi Divas de Cindy Shea. Mariachi Mujer has performed with Mexican artists such as Vikki Carr, Pablo Montero, Gerardito Fernandez and Nydia Rojas. Mariachi Divas have won two Grammy Awards, have toured extensively in the United States and are the official mariachi of Disneyland Resort in Anaheim. New York's first international all-female mariachi is 2015 Latin Grammy nominated Mariachi Flor de Toloache, who are featured in Dan Auerbach's The Arcs. An all-female mariachi in London, UK, Mariachi Las Adelitas UK, plays traditional Mexican mariachi music as well as some English-language covers in mariachi style.

English singer Sophie Ellis-Bextor's 2016 album Familia was inspired by a visit to Mexico. She posted a video in which she appears singing one of the songs from the album, "Death of Love", next to a group of mariachis in Puerto Vallarta, Jalisco.

== Women in mariachi ==
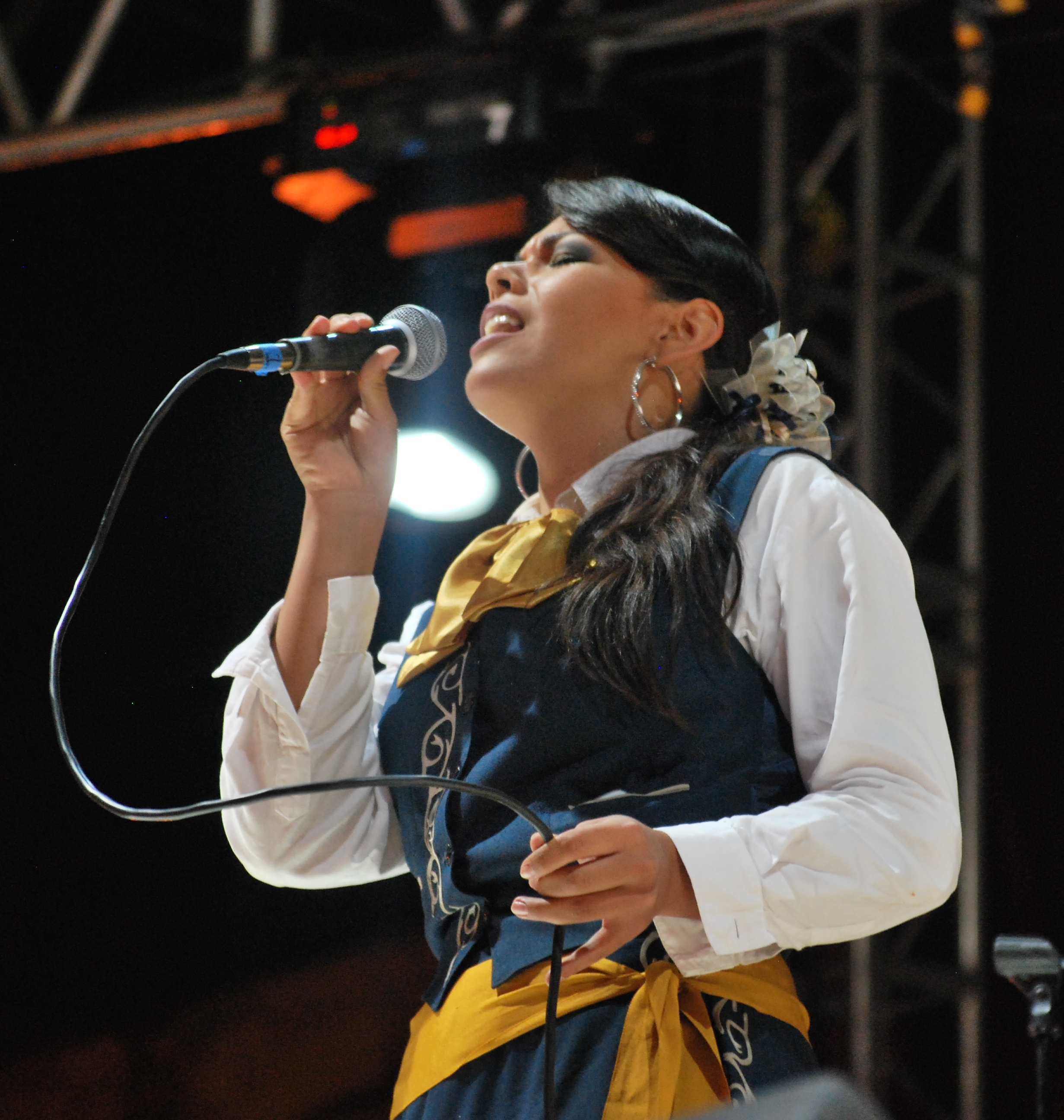
Female mariachi vocalist at the Festival del Mariachi, Charrería y Tequila in San Juan de los Lagos, Mexico

In the 1940s, the first all-female mariachi band was created, directed by Carlota Noriega, with many more to follow, primarily in the United States. These women-led mariachis or musicians faced misogyny for taking on a style of music that was considered to be male-dominated space coming from the machismo ideology. To embrace their own machismo form, these female groups would use their femininity and beauty to find success, singing songs about independence, life, heart, and the suffrage movement. These female groups adopted the same traje de charro attire that the men but added long skirts and removed the sombreros.

In 1976, the first all-women mariachi group in the US was Las Generalas. They made sure to keep their image clean by not drinking or playing late at night in order to make the American public respect mariachi. Flor de Toloache is an all-female mariachi band based in New York City founded by Mireya I. Ramos and Shae Fiol in 2008 who have gone on to collaborate with artists such as John Legend, Miguel, Camilo Lara, and Alex Cuba.

== Dance ==
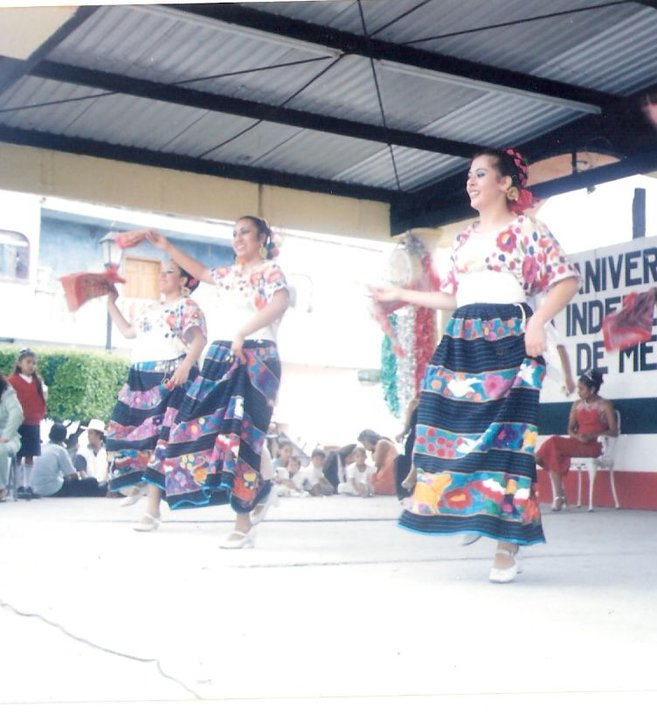
Tarima Zapateado

The most common dance technique in mariachi is zapateado, translated to "tap dance" is a kind of footwork adopted from the Spanish Flamenco dance. It is a percussive rhythmic dance that follows a plant of foot followed by a heel tap then another foot plant, and continues on this pattern.

Ballet folklórico is a dance that is not directly linked to mariachi, but they are often performed on stage together. They both involve highly gendered performances, elaborate costumes, and invite audience participation.

== Musical forms ==
- Show mariachi allows the groups to play a certain set list of songs.
- Nochistlán (sequential participatory music) allows an interactive music listening experience where audience members can request songs and even participate with karaoke.
- Meter 2/4 [chun-ta]

- Canción ranchera (2 tiempos)
- Corrido (2 tiempos)
- Polka
- Pasodoble
- Marcha

- Meter 3/4 [chun-ta-ta]

- Canción ranchera (3 tiempos)
- Corrido (3 tiempos)
- Valses mexicanos

- Meter 4/4

- Bolero ranchero
- Serenata
- Danzón
- Chotís
- Cumbia ranchera
- Canción rítmica
- Danza

- Meter 6/8

- Son jaliscience
- Sones regionales mexicanos
- Huapango

- Meter 2/4 with 6/8

- Joropo
- Son jarocho

- Mixed meter:
- Jarabe - e.g. "Jarabe Tapatío"

Other examples:

- "Muerte de un gallero" (corrido-son)
- "El Charro Mexicano" (ranchera-son)

- Classical music overtures
