= Guitarra de golpe =

Guitarra De Golpe
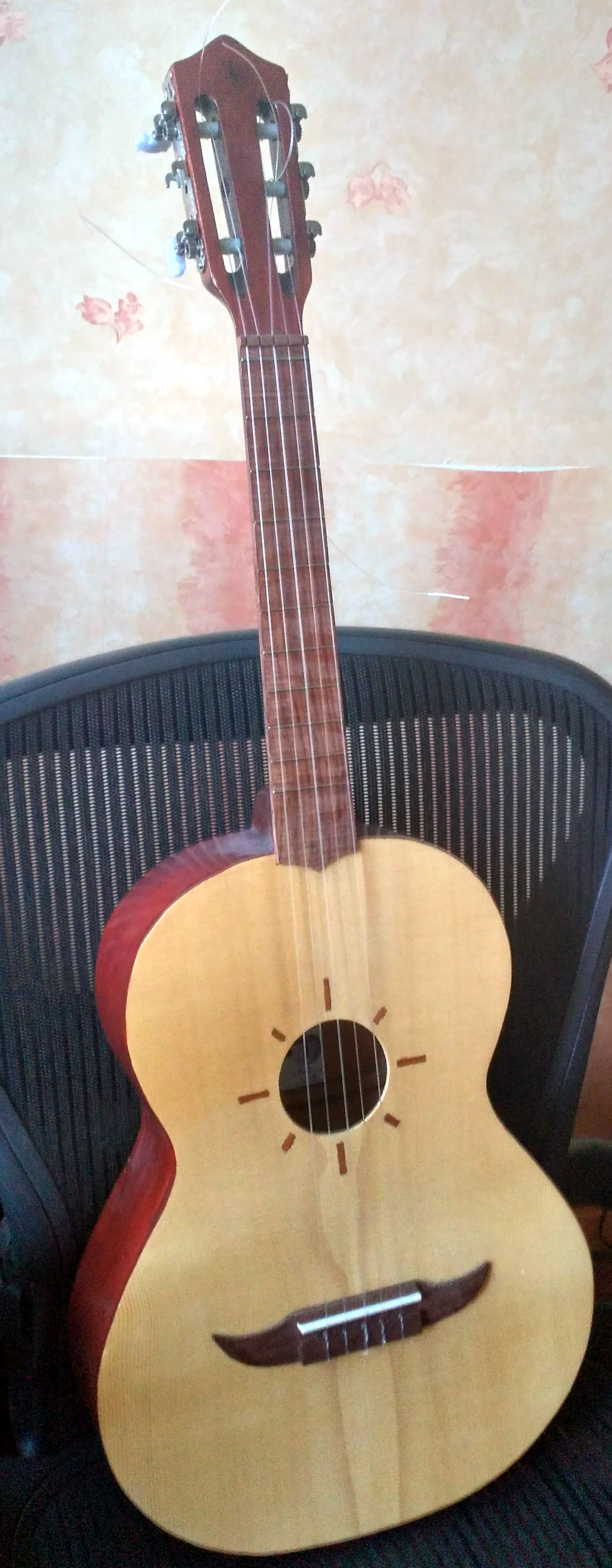
- Guitarra de golpe, front view

String instrument
- Other names: Guitarra Colorada, Quinta De Golpe, Mariachera
- Classification: String instrument
- Hornbostel–Sachs classification: (Composite chordophone)
- Developed: Jalisco and Michoacán, Mexico

Related instruments
- Mexican vihuela, Guitarrón mexicano, Huapanguera, Jarana huasteca, Guitar.

The Guitarra de golpe is a stringed musical instrument from Mexico. It has 5 nylon strings in 5 courses. The headstock traditionally has a traditional shape that is designed to look like a stylised owl with wooden pegs, but nowadays this is sometimes replaced with a guitar or vihuela style headstock with machine heads. For a while during the 20th century, the guitarra de golpe fell into disuse in traditional Mariachi groups, and was replaced by the classical guitar. It has now however been revived. It is still an essential part of the "conjuntos de arpa" from Michoacán.

Like the vihuela, it often only has a few frets, but unlike the vihuela, the frets are made of metal or wood, instead of the vihuela's tied on nylon.

== Tuning systems ==
The guitarra de golpe has no single "standard" tuning. This stems from its lack of use within the most influential mariachi ensembles that were actively recording during the musically innovative periods of the 1960s. Among the multiple tuning systems, the most common are:

- Tecalitlán
- Michoacán
- urbana
- vihuela

The first two tunings, while more traditional, complicate fingerings when voicing chords beyond triadic sonorities. As composers for mariachi began including much more complex chords, the instrument’s tuning became increasingly inadequate and difficult to play for this more extensive chord vocabulary.

The third tuning method, urbana, allows easier fingerings to access chords with harmonic extensions beyond major and minor triads.

The most commonly used tunings in present-day practice for the guitarras de golpe are either one of the urbana systems or one of the tunings that mirror a standard mariachi vihuela. The vihuela tunings allow vihuela players to use the same chord positions on the Golpe to play in the same key and additionally match the positions for many common guitar chords.

=== Tunings ===
==== Michoacán ====
Michoacán Guitarra De Golpe tuning.

Michoacán tuning:
D3, G3, C4, E3, A3

==== Tecalitlán ====
Tecalitlán tuning:
D3, G3, B3, E3, A3

==== Urbana ====
The Urbana tuning is generally done one of two ways, with string 3 being either the highest or lowest pitched string.

Urbana Arriba tuning (with string 3 as the highest pitched string):
G3, C4, E4, A3, D4

Urbana Abajo tuning (with string 3 as the lowest pitched string):
G3, C4, E3, A3, D4

==== Vihuela ====
The guitarra de golpe can be tuned like a vihuela to allow the same chord positions to be used for both instruments. The string octaves can be varied however to give the instrument an overall higher or lower tone.

Vihuela tuning (with string 3 as the highest pitched string, exactly like the vihuela):
A3, D4, G4, B3, E4

Vihuela tuning (with string 3 as the lowest pitched string):
A3, D4, G3, B3, E4

Vihuela tuning (with more strings shifted lower, displaying two instances of a reentrant tuning):
A3, D3, G3, B3, E3

== Names ==
The Guitarra de Golpe has many names.

- Guitarra de Golpe: Golpe is the name of the strumming pattern used for this and other Mexican instruments.
- Guitarra Colorada: Translates as 'red guitar'. The literal translation is "colored guitar".
- Quinta De Golpe: Fifth strum.
- Mariachera: A reference to Mariachi music.
