= Mexican vihuela =

Mexican string instrument

Vihuela Mexicana
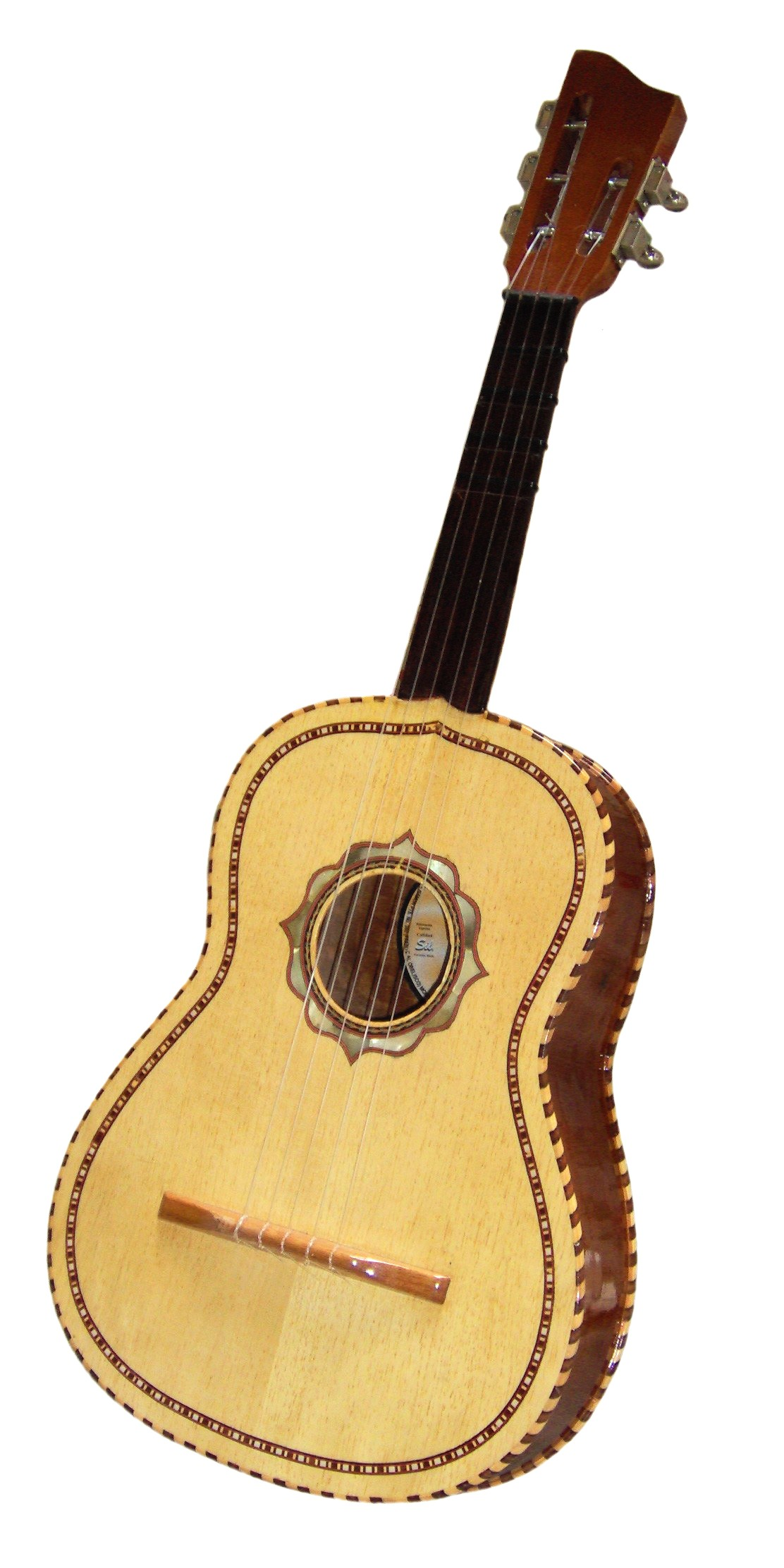
- Mexican vihuela

String instrument
- Other names: Vihuela, vihuela Mexicana
- Classification: String instrument
- Hornbostel–Sachs classification: (Composite chordophone)
- Developed: Mid/late 18th century
- Volume: Medium/loud (depending on how it is strummed)

Related instruments
- Timple, guitarra de golpe, guitar

Musicians
- Victor Cardenas (El Pato), Nati Cano, Mario Hernandez, Fernando Gonzales (el Cochero), Tony Zuniga, Ricardo torres, Noe Garcia (VihuelaTv), Arturo Martinez (El Diablito) Israel Bustos (el Salee) Rachael Rodriguez (MariaChingona)

Builders
- Don Ruben Morales, Javier Salinas, Jose Juan Hernández, Salvador Hernández, Tomas Delgado, Luis Javier Flores, Jacinto Lemus Reyes

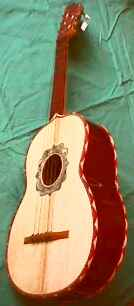
Side view showing the vaulted back

The Mexican vihuela ([biˈwe.la]) is a guitar-like string instrument from 19th-century Mexico with five strings and typically played in mariachi groups.

== Description ==
The Mexican vihuela is a small, deep-bodied rhythm guitar built along the same lines as the guitarrón. It is mostly used by mariachi groups. The purpose of the vihuela in a mariachi group is to give a duet of sorts with the Spanish guitar, one having a low tuning while the vihuela has the higher tuning to complement each other. The Mexican vihuela is tuned so that the open G, the D and the A strings are tuned an octave higher than a guitar thus giving it a tenor sound or a higher pitch.

Although the Mexican vihuela has the same name as the historical Spanish plucked string instrument, the two are distinct. The Mexican vihuela has more in common with the Timple Canario due to both having five strings and both having vaulted (convex) backs. The gauge of the strings and the order in which they are applied is important in producing a soft sound or a punchy bold sound when the instrument is strummed. The optimal spot to strum this instrument is between the sound hole and the point where the fret board or neck meets the body of the instrument. This area is where a pick guard can be installed (the same linear area between the upper and lower bouts closest to the fingerboard.)

This instrument is strummed with all of the fingernail tips to produce a rich, full and clear sound of the chords being played. A finger pick (la púa) on the pointer finger and or the second and third fingers, gives it a brighter and clearer sound when strummed, which is called a mánico, a reference to the rhythmic patterns. Many vihuela players grow their fingernails on their strumming hand longer to facilitate their playing technique and to get a clear crystal sound.

== Notes and tuning ==
Vihuela Mexicana tuning

The vihuela has five nylon strings in reentrant tuning. They are tuned similarly to the first five strings of a guitar, but with the third, fourth and fifth an octave above what one might expect.

Tuning: A3, D4, G4, B3, E4 – The A, D, and G are tuned one octave above a guitar.

== Sources ==
- Blattman, Erica et al. (2002). "Mariachi Embraced in Our World"
