= Guitarrón mexicano =

Mexican acoustic bass instrument

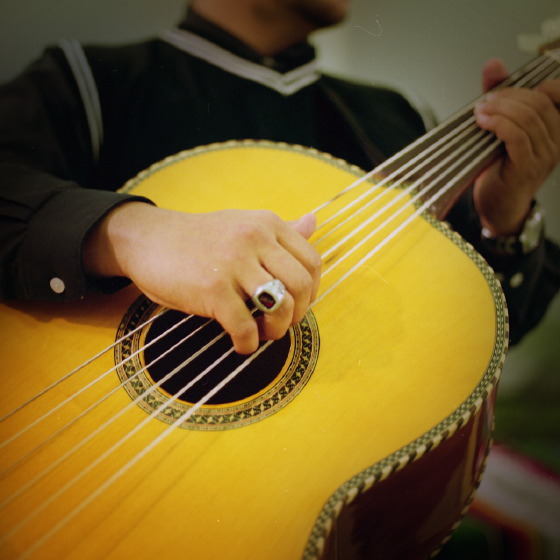
A close-up of a guitarrón being played

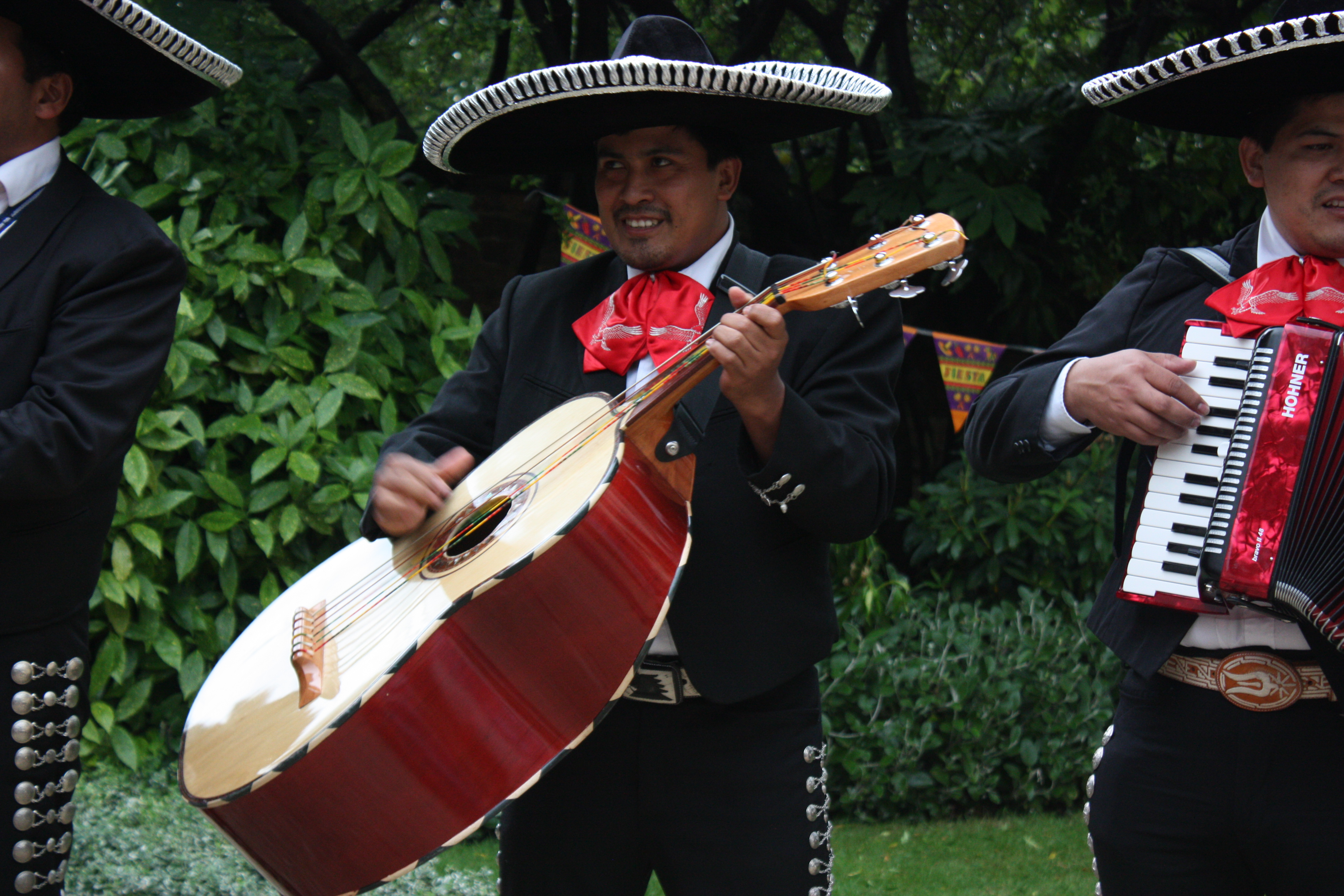
A guitarrón player in a Mariachi uniform

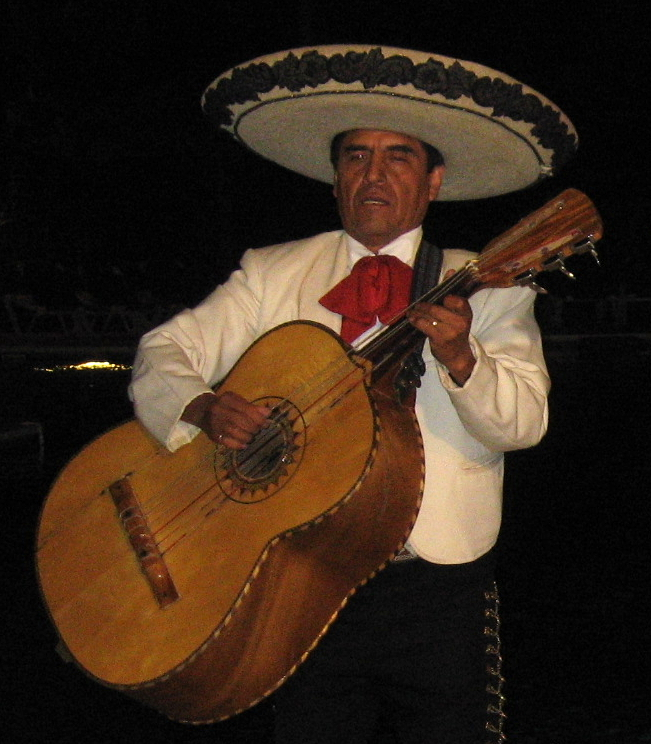
A Mexican guitarrón player in a traditional Mariachi uniform

The guitarrón mexicano (Spanish for "big Mexican guitar", the suffix -ón being a Spanish augmentative) or Mexican guitarrón is a very large, deep-bodied Mexican six-string acoustic bass guitar played traditionally in Mariachi groups. Although similar to the guitar, it is not a derivative of that instrument, but was independently developed from the sixteenth-century Spanish bajo de uña ("fingernail[-plucked] bass"). Because its great size gives it volume, it does not require electric amplification for performances in small venues. The guitarrón is fretless with heavy gauge strings, most commonly nylon for the high three and wound metal for the low three. The guitarrón is usually played by doubling notes at the octave, a practice facilitated by the standard guitarrón tuning A_{1} D_{2} G_{2} C_{3} E_{3} A_{2}. Unlike a guitar, the instrument uses re-entrant tuning where pitch of the guitarrón strings do not always rise as strings move directionally downward from the lowest-pitched string (A_{2}, which is the 6th string from the lowest-pitched string, is a perfect 5th below its adjacent string E_{3}).

The guitarrón was the inspiration behind Ernie Ball's development of the first modern acoustic bass guitar, released on the market in 1972.

== Use ==
=== Traditional uses ===
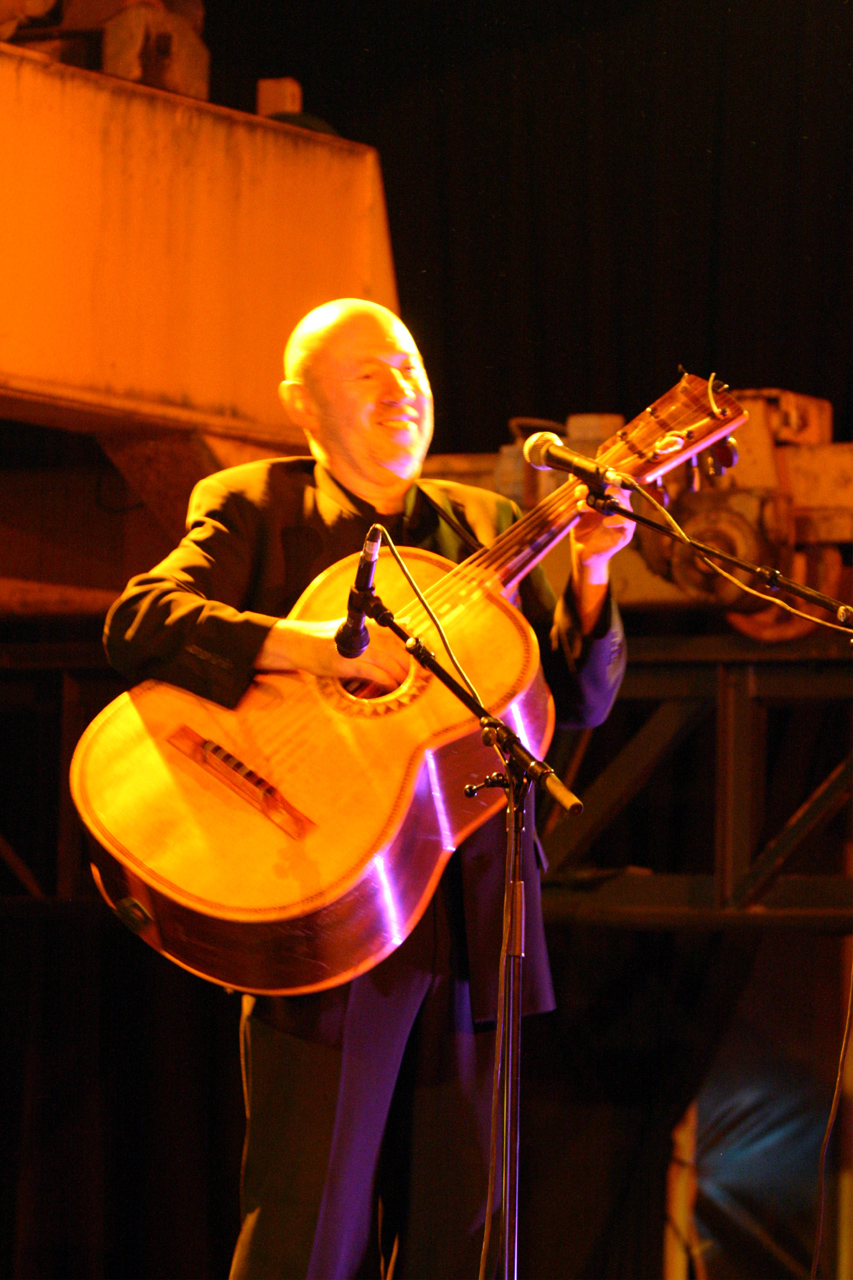
Nelson Gómez performing

The guitarrón is used in Mexican Mariachi groups, which usually consist of at least two violins, two trumpets, one Spanish guitar, a vihuela (a high-pitched, five-string guitar-type instrument), and the guitarrón. A strap is usually used to keep the instrument up and playable. The guitarrón is the principal rhythm instrument in the mariachi group, and it serves as the bass instrument, playing deep pitches. The rhythmic propulsion of the basslines played on it help to keep the other instruments together. It is unusual for a group to have more than one guitarrón player.

Guitarrón players need good left-hand strength to stop (press down the strings onto the fingerboard) the heavy strings of the instrument and a strong right hand, specifically the index, middle finger, and thumb, to pluck the thick, heavy strings (usually a metal and a nylon string). The right hand is typically used to pluck two strings at a time, to play the bassline in octaves, even though it is notated as a single note bass part. Since the strings are so thick, the player has to keep on or a bit ahead of the beat, rather than behind the beat. The instrument is used to play basslines that "walk" through the chord progression with rising and falling arpeggio figures and scales. Triads are often used in most songs. The instrument plays more ornamented lines to embellish cadences and key, meter, or tempo changes.

=== Non-traditional uses ===
- Mexican composer Julián Carrillo adapted the guitarrón for microtonal music by adding frets to enable it to play eighths of a tone. He scored for this instrument, under the name octavina, in several compositions, most notably the Preludio a Colón (1922).
- The guitarrón is played by Roy Estrada on the 1966 Mothers of Invention album Freak Out!.
- Randy Meisner of the Eagles also plays the guitarrón on the track "New Kid in Town" from the album Hotel California (1976; in the credits the name of the instrument is anglicized to "guitarone").
- One American player using the guitarrón in a non-traditional context is Aaron Goldsmith, formerly of the New York-based multicultural acoustic ensemble Luminescent Orchestrii; he uses a modified guitarrón with an elongated neck that allows him to play melodically.
- Played by Simon Edwards, the guitarrón was a defining element of the 1980s British folk-pop band Fairground Attraction. In addition, Edwards plays the guitarrón on the Talk Talk album Spirit of Eden (labelled "Mexican bass" in liner notes.)
- Conrad Lozano has often played a guitarrón with his band Los Lobos.

== Design ==
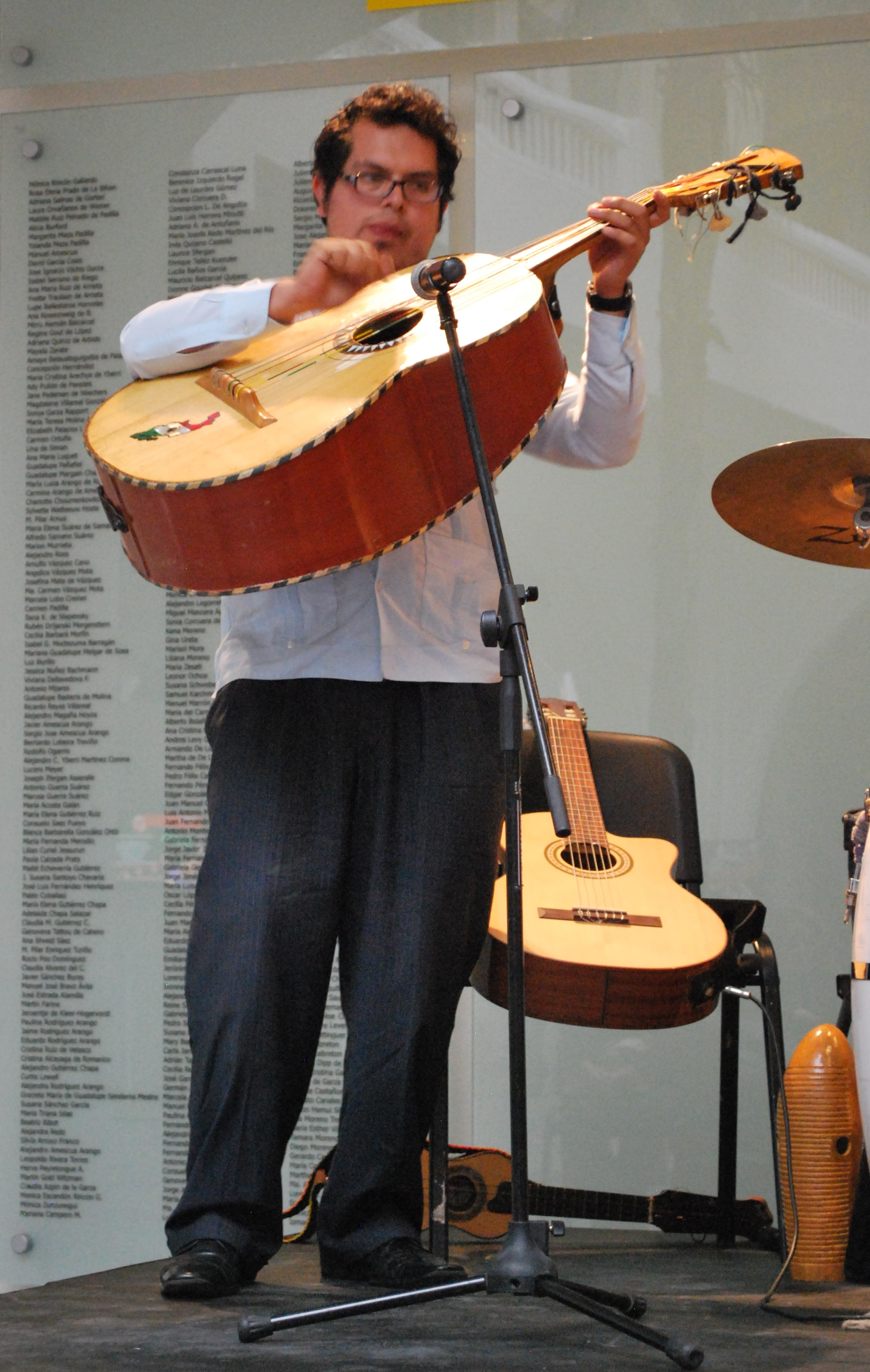
In this photo, the wooden bridge can be seen. A member of Citadino Son demonstrates a guitarrón at the Museo de Arte Popular, Mexico City, in 2012.

The back of the guitarrón is made of two pieces of wood that are set at an angle making the back shaped like a shallow letter V. This design feature increases the depth and overall size of the instrument. The arched shape helps the instrument to project a strong, deep tone. The sides and back are made from Mexican cedar and the top is made from tacote, a wood that is both lightweight and strong. Tuning machines with worm gears serve to increase or decrease the tension on the strings, which is how the instrument is tuned.

== See also ==
- Acoustic bass guitar
- Bass guitar
- Mariachi
- Guitarrón chileno
- Rondalla
