= Eastside Café =

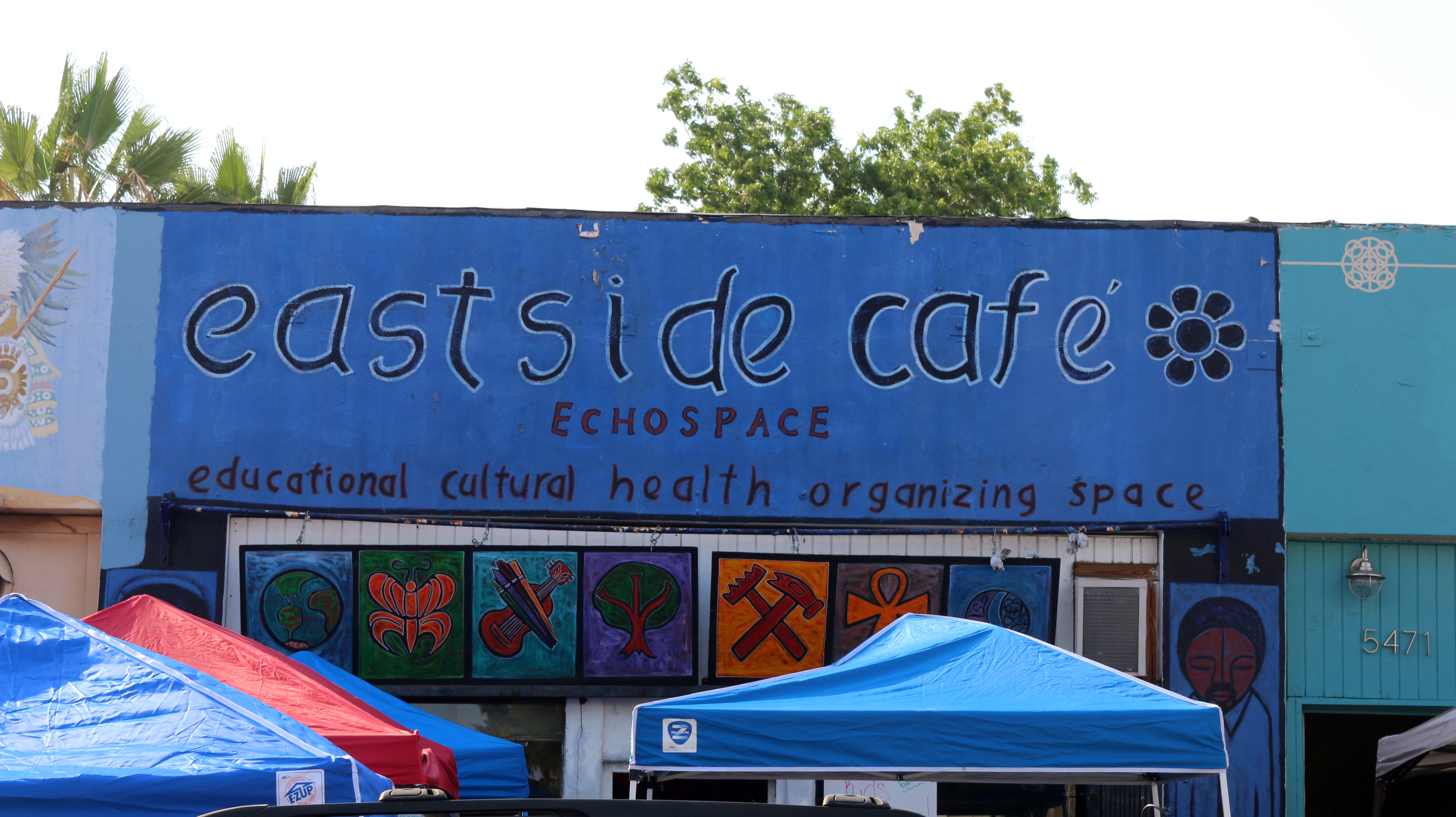
- Exterior view of Eastside Café

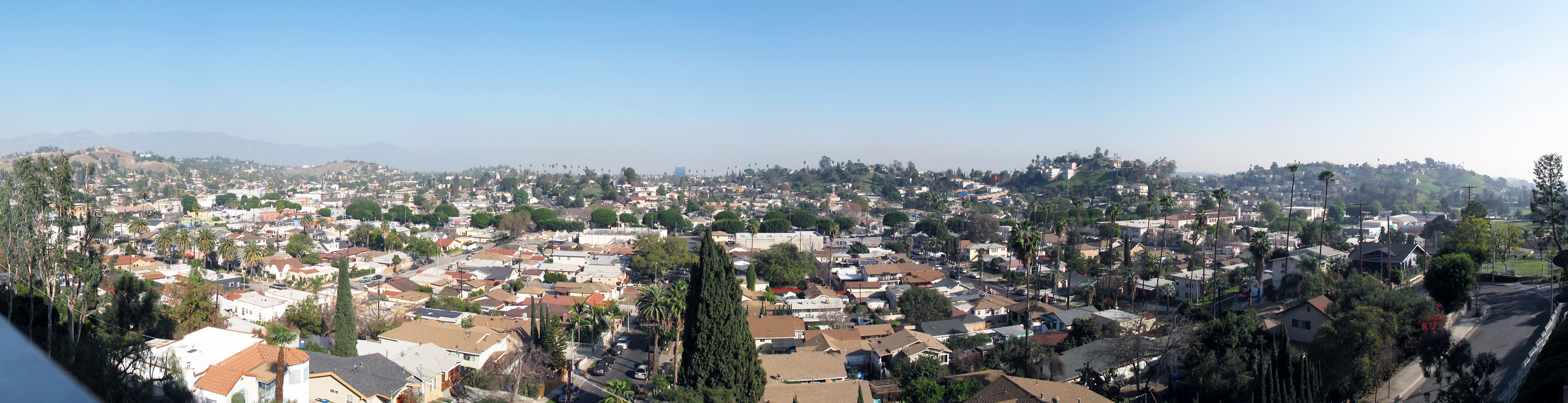
- Panoramic view of El Sereno
- Established: 2004
- Location: El Sereno, Los Angeles
- Website: www.eastsidecafe.org

The Eastside Café is an autonomous community organization founded in 2004 in the United States, located in El Sereno, Los Angeles, California. The collective is run by El Sereno residents and is inspired by the Zapatista movement, which sought the rights and autonomy of indigenous communities in Chiapas, Mexico in the early 1990s. Despite the name, the locale isn't a coffee shop, but rather an East Los Angeles cultural center.

== Mission ==
The Eastside Café's mission includes the statement, "We are dedicated to rebuilding, reconstructing and reclaiming our communities by creating sustainable projects and collectives to empower one another … We are committed to supporting an active citizenry and renewed communal identity that is continuously engaged in planning for the future through self-determination, education, cultural arts and community dialogue."

== History ==
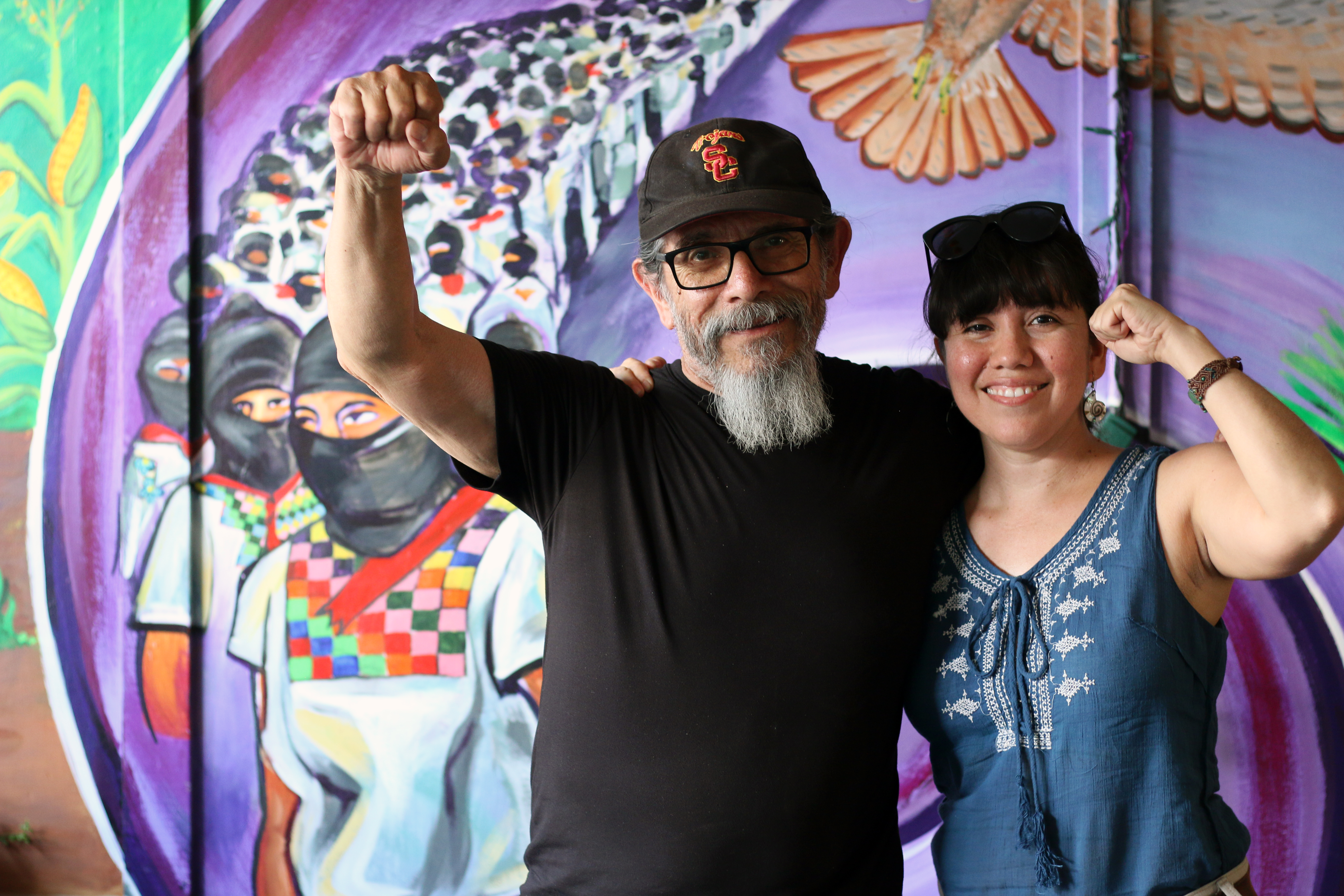
Founders Roberto Flores and Angela Flores.

The collective was formed in 2004 by Roberto Flores, his daughter Angela Flores, and 30 other co-founding community members and artist-activists, including Las Cafeteras members Denise Carlos and Jose Cano. At first, the Eastside Café consisted of community meetings, called platicas, in the Flores home, where interested parties could discuss how the future organization could remain autonomous and without colonizing influence. Community members discussed injustices they felt in their own lives and brainstormed ways they could address them collectively. They decided upon the name Eastside Café in honor of a local coffee shop, Luna Sol, which was the only POC-run business in the area at the time.

After more than a decade as a community focal point, in 2017, Eastside Café community members learned of a commercial real estate developer looking to purchase the building, threatening the center's future. El Sereno community members led a protest against gentrification to raise enough funds to buy out the space. Owning the building would be an important step towards further actualizing the collective's mission to be a 100% autonomous organization. Flores found out that the landlord had already sold the building without informing tenants. After Flores' negotiating with him, the landlord gave the Eastside Café community 10 days to come up with funds to purchase the building. The Eastside Café community managed to raise $180,000 in those 10 days, enough to make an initial offer. Among those who donated were notable local musicians, Aloe Blacc and Maya Jupiter.

Angela Flores, who continues to be a guiding force for the collective, has said that "It’s more than a space, it’s a state of mind."

== Programs ==
The Eastside Café hosts a number of workshops, classes, and events on a donation basis. Among the options offered are ESL classes, yoga, DACA application clinics, and son jarocho classes.

=== Son jarocho ===
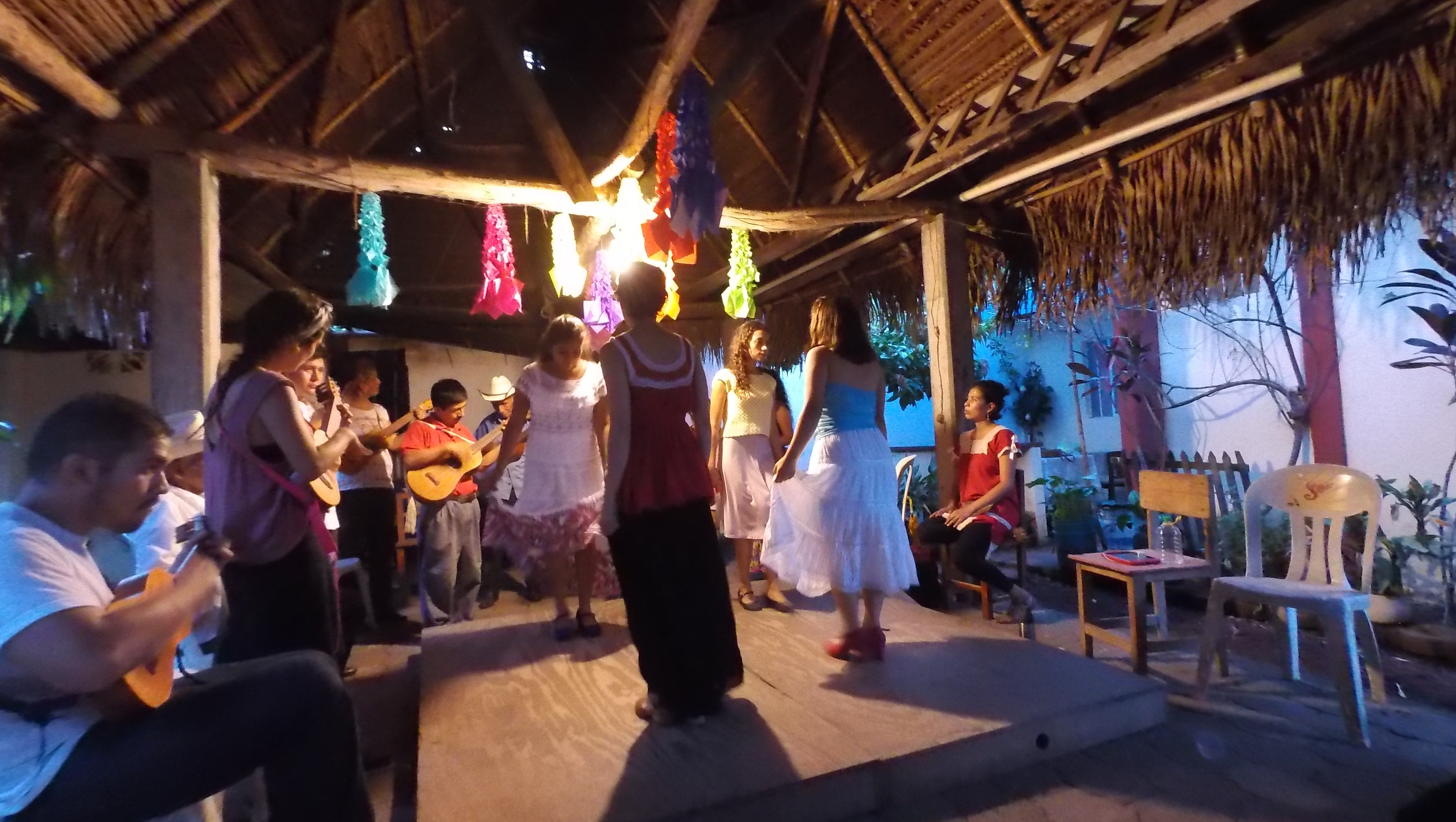
Example of Zapateando Son Jarocho, a dance practice from Veracruz, Mexico.

The band Las Cafeteras got their start at the Eastside Café, citing the organization's weekly son jarocho classes as an important part of their musical formation. The band learned to play instruments central to the son jarocho Afro-Mexican folk music style from Veracruz, Mexico - including the jarana, requinto, quijada, and tarima. The seven members also learned zapateado at these classes, a rhythmic dancing style from Mexico punctuated by percussive footwork.

=== Other programs ===
- ESL classes
- Exhibitions and music performances
- Community meetings and workshops
- Warriors Self Defense jiu-jitsu classes
- Womyn's Circle, bi-weekly program facilitated by Purple and Margaux Hernandez.

== Funding ==
The Eastside Café is supported by volunteers and does not receive funding from the government, corporations, or many donors outside of the El Sereno community.
