= Las Cafeteras =

Chicano band from East Los Angeles, California

- Origin: East Los Angeles, California, United States
- Genres: Folk; son jarocho; urban son
- Years active: 2005–present
- Members: Daniel French; David Flores; Denise Carlos; Jose Cano; Hector Flores; Leah Gallegos
- Past members: Annette Torres
- Website: Official Website; Las Cafeteras on facebook Las Cafeteras on Twitter

Las Cafeteras is a Chicano band from East Los Angeles, California. Their music fuses spoken word and folk music, with traditional Son jarocho and zapateado dancing.

== History ==
The band started out as students of the Eastside Café, a community space in El Sereno, Los Angeles, where they took Son Jarocho classes. Influenced by music from Veracruz, Mexico and eager to teach others about it, they started formally playing in 2005. Since forming, they have shared the stage with artists such as, Caifanes, Lila Downs, Juanes, Ozomatli, Edward Sharpe and the Magnetic Zeroes and the Los Angeles Philharmonic.

Their namesake derives from the organization where they took classes. To honor women, they feminized their group name by naming themselves Las Cafeteras, rather than Los Cafeteros.

Las Cafeteras' songs have themes and references that range from the Civil Rights Movement, United Farm Workers, DREAM Act, immigration reform to female homicides in Ciudad Juárez. Their song, "La Bamba Rebelde", a remake of The traditional Mexican song from the state of Veracruz "La Bamba", denotes their Chicano pride. They say that they construct their music as a tool for creating positive change and inspiring others to do so.

== Band members ==
- Daniel French – vocals, jarana, MC
- David Flores — requinto jarocho
- Denise Carlos – vocals, jarana, zapateado, glockenspiel
- Jose Cano — cajón, Native American flute, harmonica
- Hector Flores – vocals, zapateado
- Leah Gallegos – vocals, quijada, zapateado

=== Past members ===
- Annette Torres — marimbol, zapateado

== Discography ==
- Live at Mucho Wednesdays (2009)
- It's Time (2012)

| No. | Title | Length |
|---|---|---|
| 1. | "El Chuchumbé" | 3:26 |
| 2. | "Café con Pan" | 4:21 |
| 3. | "Luna Lovers" | 5:15 |
| 4. | "El Zapateado" | 4:06 |
| 5. | "Ya Me Voy" | 4:55 |
| 6. | "It's Movement Time" | 3:29 |
| 7. | "La Bamba Rebelde" | 5:20 |
| 8. | "La Petenera" | 6:09 |
| 9. | "Mujer Soy" | 4:56 |
| 10. | "Trajabador Trajabadora" | 10:51 |

- Tastes Like L.A. (2017)
- Ritmo De Mi Pueblo (2018) with Making Movies

| No. | Title | Length |
|---|---|---|
| 1. | "El Ritmo De Mi Pueblo" | 3:06 |
| 2. | "Tormenta" | 4:34 |
| 3. | "Feo Mas Bello" | 3:00 |
| 4. | "La Montaña" | 2:14 |
| 5. | "Making Movies, Flor De Toloache - Amor De Mis Amores (bonus track)" | 5:00 |

- A Night In Nepantla (2024)

| No. | Title | Length |
|---|---|---|
| 1. | "Cumbia de mi Barrio" | 3:12 |
| 2. | "Esta Noche" | 3:38 |
| 3. | "El Camino" | 3:48 |
| 4. | "Caravana" | 3:32 |
| 5. | "Vivas Nos Queremos" | 3:53 |
| 6. | "More of You" | 2:45 |
| 7. | "Morena Morena" | 3:33 |
| 8. | "Tia Lucha" | 4:01 |
| 9. | "Nepantla" | 5:13 |
