= Cambalache (band) =

- Origin: East Los Angeles, California
- Genre: Son Jarocho
- Years active: 2007–
- Members: Cesar Castro; Xochi Flores; Manuel de Jesus "Chuy" Sandoval; Juan "El Unico" Perez
- Website: loscambalache.com

Cambalache is a Son Jarocho band based in East Los Angeles, California. They are one of the key bands at the center of the son jarocho explosion in Los Angeles in 2010s.

== Biography ==
Cambalache (a word meaning "exchange") is a Chicano-Jarocho group based in East Los Angeles, founded in 2007 and led by Cesar Castro (Master Luthier Sonero and Jarocho from Veracruz, Mexico). Cambalache promotes traditional Son Jarocho music through concerts, presentations and workshops.

In 2013, they released first full-length album Una historia del fandango (A History of the Fandango) by successfully fundraising through Kickstarter.

== Discography ==
=== Albums ===
- Una Historia de Fandango (2013)

== Members ==
- Cesar Castro : Musical Director, Vocals, Requinto, Pandero, Quijada
- Xochi Flores : Vocals, Jarana Tercera, Zapateado
- Manuel de Jesus "Chuy" Sandoval : Vocals, Jarana Segunda
- Juan "El Unico" Perez : Bass
