= Quetzal (band) =

Chicano rock band from Los Angeles, California

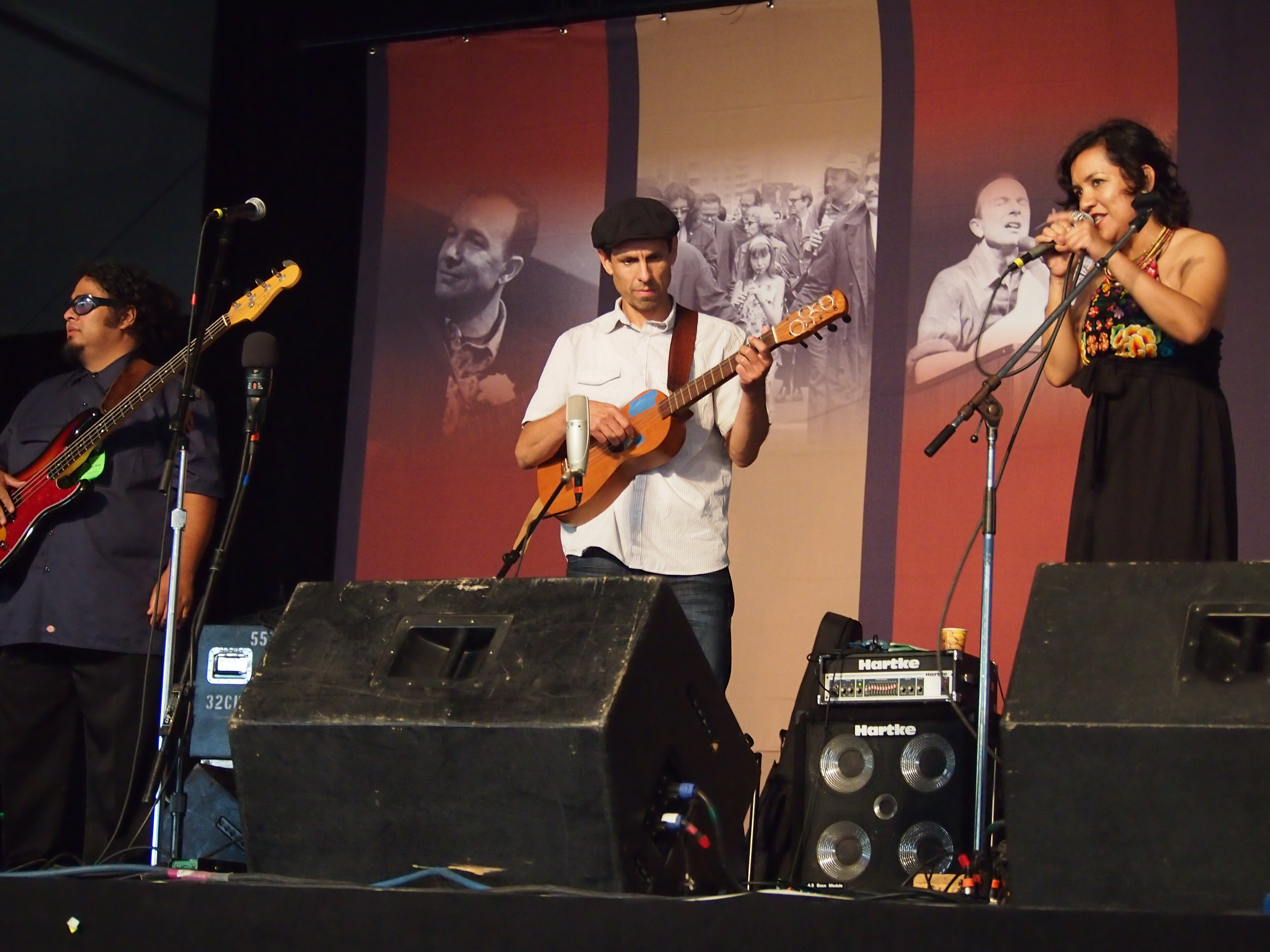

Background information
- Origin: East Los Angeles, California, United States
- Genres: Chicano rock, Alternative, Rock
- Years active: 1990s–present
- Labels: Son de Barrio, Vanguard Records, Smithsonian Folkways
- Members: Dr. Martha Gonzalez; Juan Perez; Quetzal Flores; Evan Greer; Alberto López; Tylana Enomoto
- Past members: Quincy McCrary; Andy Mendoza; Rocio Marrón; Cesar Castro; Dante Pascuzzo; Edson Gianesi; Gabriel Gonzalez; Gabriel Tenorio; Peter Jacobson
- Website: Official website

Quetzal is a bilingual (Spanish-English) Chicano rock band from East Los Angeles, California.

== History ==
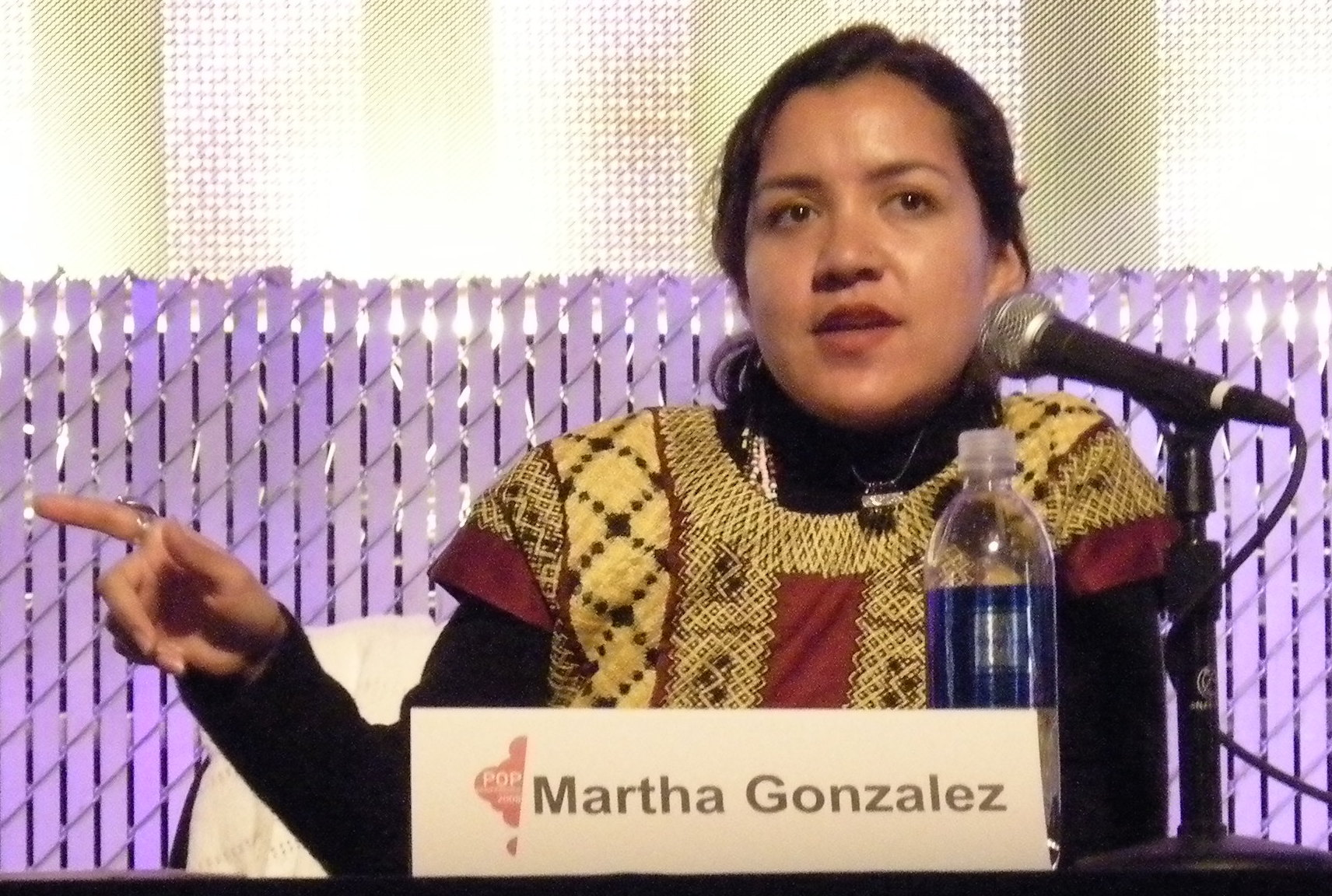
Martha Gonzalez of Quetzal, 2008

The band was founded by Quetzal Flores in 1993 in a Chicano owned cafe, Troy cafe, in the Little Tokyo neighborhood of Los Angeles. Martha Gonzalez joined the group in 1995. They helped start the Seattle Fandango Project in 2009 when Martha Gonzalez moved to Seattle to complete her PhD in Gender, Women & Sexuality Studies at the University of Washington.

Quetzal is an ensemble of musicians. Martha Gonzalez, the band's lead singer, percussionist, and songwriter, calls it an “East LA Chican@ rock group”, highlighting its strong feminist stance and Chicano roots.

== Music style ==
Quetzal plays a mix of Mexican and Afro-Cuban rhythms, jazz, rhythm and blues, and rock music. Inspired by the Zapatistas, they incorporate fandango and san jarocho in their music.

In 1992, Chicano rock guitarist Quetzal Flores discovered the burgeoning revival of traditional music of Veracruz called son jarocho which is born from a community fiesta called a fandango. Quetzal Flores described the community of fandango in the L.A. area as a necessary practice because "I think it's because as human beings we are kind of lacking this sort of connection, like these one-on-one connections in this high tech world." Flores incorporated san jarocho and fandango into his own music style, which is influenced by The Smiths, Ruben Blades, Stevie Wonder, and others.

Flores's musical approach was influenced by various genres such as Mexican musica ranchera, salsa, Chicano Rock, R&B, and international popular music, prevalent in the East L.A. musical scene. Coming from a family of social activists, he viewed music as a medium to strive for social justice and a way to express creativity. The band utilized music as a tool to convey the struggle for dignity.

== Career ==
Quetzal was featured in the soundtrack to the 2004 short film Stand Up For Justice: The Ralph Lazo Story. In 2013, the band won a Grammy for Best Latin Pop, Rock or Urban Album. Martha Gonzalez and Quetzal Flores are co-producers of Entre Mujeres, a CD released in 2012. The band was invited to speak and perform in the U.S. Library of Congress and Kennedy Center's Homegrown music series. The Smithsonian Institution's traveling exhibit "American Sabor: Latinos in U.S. Popular Music" feature Quetzal as leaders and innovators of Chicano music. Smithsonian Folkways label released the 2013 Grammy-winning CD Imaginaries, marking the importance of Gonzalez's past and ongoing work. They have also been instrumental in developing Fandango Sin Fronteras, a dialog between Chicanos and Chicanas from California and jarochos-musicians who play the Veracruz style.

Quetzal's work has been the subject of a range of publications, including dissertations, scholarly books, and newspaper articles, most notably Patricia Zavella's I'm Neither Here Nor There: Mexicans' Quotidian Struggles with Migration and Poverty.

== Album: Imaginaries ==
Imaginaries refers to scholar Emma Pérez's book, The Decolonial Imaginary: Writing Chicanas into History. To the band it's about creating and occupying a physical and conceptual space outside the established structures of capitalism and government. It's a safe space created by neighbors, or musicians, or artists, or kids, or adults, or viejitos, or a combination of any of these. They're inspired to create community around music, a communion where the listener is as much musician as the people on the stage holding the instruments.

Quetzal won the Grammy for Latin rock, urban or alternative album for its release Imaginaries (Smithsonian Folkways Recordings), a foray into cumbia, neo-'80s-style R&B, Cuban charanga and Brazilian pandeiro, charged with the band's collectivist political passion. It is the band's first Grammy.

On Imaginaries, they combined the traditional son jarocho of Veracruz, salsa, R&B, and more to express the political and social struggle for self-determination and self-representation, which ultimately is a struggle for dignity. The album had 12 tracks, 55 minutes, 40-page booklet with bilingual notes. This album is part of the Smithsonian Folkways Tradiciones/Traditions series of Latino music albums, produced with support by the Smithsonian Latino Center.

== Line-up ==
=== Current band members ===
- Martha Gonzalez — lead and backing vocals, congas, chekere, tarima, cajon, tap dance, jarana
- Tylana Enomoto — backing vocals, violin
- Juan Perez — electric bass, baby bass, double bass
- Quetzal Flores — jarana jarocha, requinto jarocho, bajo sexto, electric and acoustic guitars
- Quincy McCrary — lead and backing vocals, Rhodes piano, Hammond B3, keyboard
- Alberto Lopez — percussion

=== Former band members ===
- Gabriel Tenorio
- Gabriel Gonzalez
- Daphne Chen
- Kiko Cornejo Jr.
- Dante Pascuzzo
- Edson Gianesi
- Danilo Torres
- Camilo Landau
- Rocio Marron
- Ray Sandoval
- Yunior Terry
- Lilia Hernandez
- Ruben Gomez
- Maceo Hernandez
- Robert Guerrero
- Anton Morales
- E Anthony Martinez

== Discography ==
Solo albums

- 1998: Quetzal (produced by John Avila)
- 2002: Sing The Real (produced by Greg Landau)
- 2003: Worksongs (produced by Steve Berlin)
- 2006: Die Cowboy Die (produced by John Avila)
- 2012: Imaginaries (Produced by Quetzal Flores) Smithsonian Folkways Recordings
- 2014: Quetzanimales
- 2017: The Eternal Getdown Smithsonian Folkways Recordings
- 2021: Puentes Sonoros Smithsonian Folkways Recordings

Compilation albums

- A Fair Forgery of Pink Floyd (features Quetzal covering Pink Floyd's song "Mother")
