= Son de Madera =

Son de Madera is a son jarocho band based in Veracruz, Mexico. Its core members are Ramón Gutiérrez Hernández, Tereso Vega, and Rubí Oseguera Rueda. The band was founded in 1992 by Ramón Gutiérrez and Laura Rebolloso.

== Personnel ==
Gutiérrez, based in Xalapa, Veracruz, leads the group, plays the guitarra de son (also called requinto jarocho), and sings. José Tereso Vega Hernández, son of elder master-musician Andrés Vega, lives in the Municipality of Tlacotalpan, plays the jarana, sings, and plays harmonica on "Buscapies." Rubí Oseguera, who relocated to Mexico City from Minatitlán, is widely admired among jaranero revivalists as a model of traditional jarocho dance style; her footwork (zapateado) adds a percussive cadence to some of the band's performances. Los Angeles-based Mexican American Juan Pérez plays electric bass, adding a contemporary touch to the group’s sound.

Several guest artists, all long-time associates of Son de Madera, add sounds and sensibilities of both the avant-garde and the "rear guard" of son jarocho performance. Guitarra de son player Andrés Vega (b. 1932), Tereso’s father, is widely revered as a fountainhead of the rural son tradition. Patricio Hidalgo Belli, grandson of Arcadio Hidalgo, plies his talents for singing improvised poetry. Natalia Arroyo Rodríguez, violinist, and Rubén Vásquez Domínguez, arpa jarocha player, performed about a dozen times with the band at the Smithsonian Folklife Festival in 2009.

Son de Madera has long been at the forefront of a musical revival and revitalization, drawing from sounds, styles, and musicians that remain at the margins of the more commercialized son jarocho while incorporating new sounds and stylistic perspectives.

== Discography ==
Studio albums

- 1996: Son de madera (CD)
- 2004: Las Orquestas Del Día (CD)
- 2009: Son de Mi Tierra (CD)
- 2009: Mexico Son de Madera (CD)
- 2014: Caribe Mar Sincopado (CD)

Live albums

- 2013: Concierto en Vivo, Glatt & Verkehrt - Viena, Austria (CD)
