= Martha Gonzalez (musician) =

Chicana artist and activist

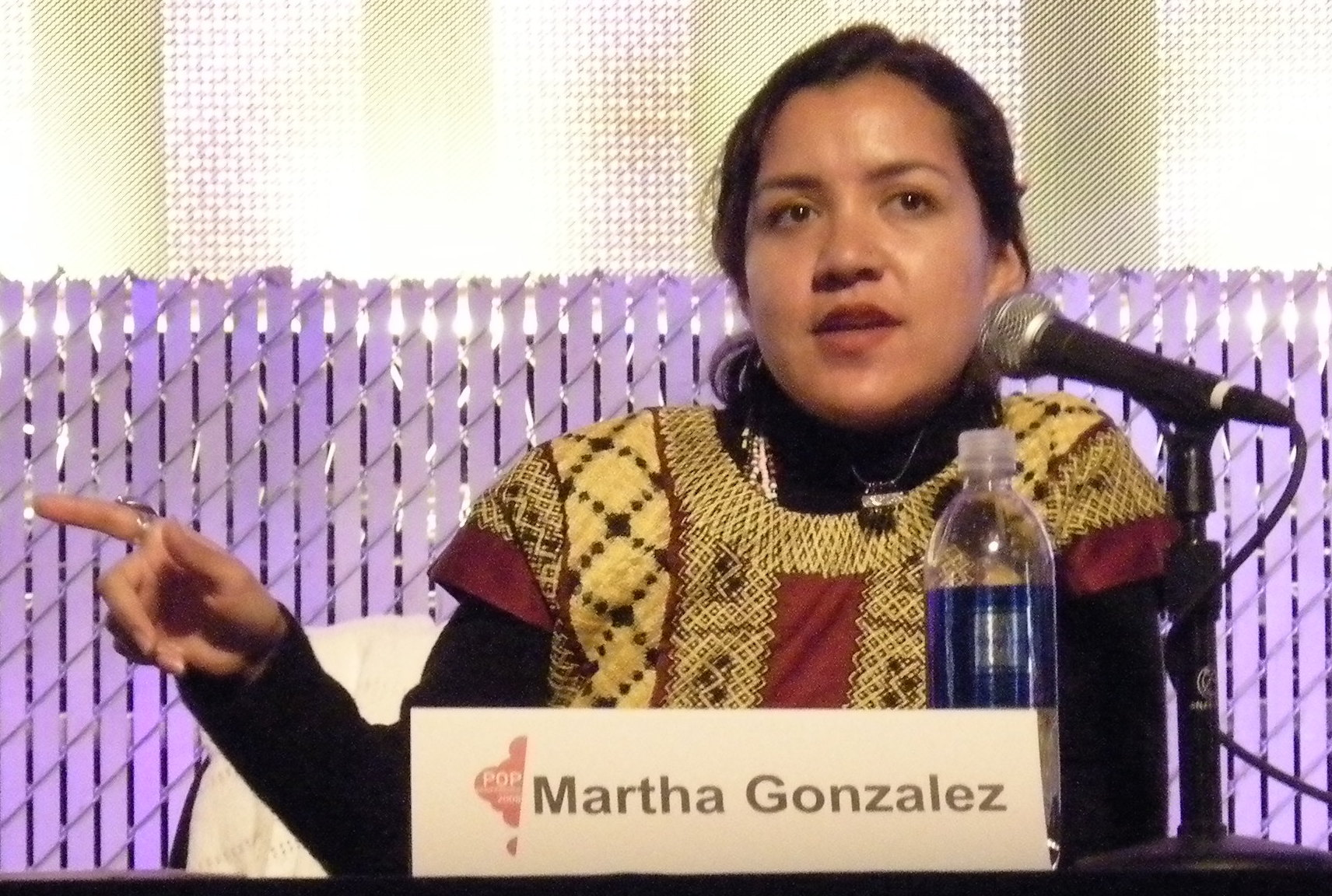
- Born: 53–54; Los Angeles, California
- Citizenship: United States
- Education: University of California, Los Angeles (B.A.); University of Washington (Ph.D.)

Martha Gonzalez is a Chicana artivista (artist/activist) Grammy award winning musician, feminist music theorist and Associate Professor and Chair of the Intercollegiate Department of Chicana/o Latina/o Studies at Scripps College. Claremont College. Born and raised in Boyle Heights Gonzalez has received various fellowships including a Fulbright Garcia-Robles, Ford Fellowship, Woodrow Wilson, USA Fellowship as well as the MacArthur Fellow by the MacArthur Foundation.(2022).

== Academic and Artistic career ==
Gonzalez holds a PhD degree in Gender, Women & Sexuality Studies from the University of Washington and a BA in ethnomusicology from the University of California, Los Angeles. Gonzalez received a Fulbright Garcia-Robles Scholar (2007–2008), a Ford Foundation Dissertation Fellowship (2012–2013), and a Woodrow Wilson Career Enhancement Fellowship (2016–2017). Her academic interests have been fueled by her own musicianship as a singer/songwriter and percussionist for the Grammy Award winning band Quetzal. The relevance of Quetzal's music and lyrics have been noted in a range of publications, from dissertations to scholarly books. Quetzal's latest recording "Memory and Return" (a collaboration with David Hidalgo of Los Lobos) was released on TlacuiloJoint in the fall of 2025. Gonzalez along with Quetzal Flores have been instrumental in catalyzing the transnational dialogue between Chicanx/Latinx communities in the U.S and Jarocho communities in Veracruz, Mexico and have been active in implementing the collective songwriting method in community spaces, classrooms, and correctional facilities throughout the U.S. Most recently, Gonzalez’s tarima (stomp box) and zapateado dance shoes were acquired by the National Museum of American History and are on permanent display in the “One Nation Many Voices” exhibit. Gonzalez’s first manuscript Chican@ Artivistas: Music, Community, and Transborder Tactics in East Los Angeles was published by the University of Texas Press in 2020 and translated into the Spanish Language in 2024 by Interpec.

== Musical career ==
Gonzalez is a singer/songwriter and percussionist for the Chicano rock band Quetzal. Gonzalez also co-founder of FandangObon. In addition, Gonzalez and her partner Quetzal Flores have played a key roles in connecting Chican@/Latin@ communities in the U.S. and Jarocho communities in Veracruz, Mexico. In September 2011, the U.S. Library of Congress and Kennedy Center invited Gonzalez to perform and speak as a part of their "Homegrown" music series.

Gonzalez has collaborated musically and/or toured with numerous artists, including Los Lobos, Los Van Van, Jackson Browne, Susana Baca, Perla Batalla, Jaguares, Ozomatli, Jonathan Richman, Los Muñequitos de Matanzas, ¡Cubanismo!, Taj Mahal, Tom Waits, Los Super Seven, Lila Downs, Raul Malo, Rick Trevino, Son de Madera, Relicario, Chuchumbe Charanga Cakewalk, B-Side Players, Teatro Campesino and Laura Rebolloso.

In the summer of 2014, Gonzalez's tarima (stomp box) and zapateado shoes were acquired by the National Museum of American History.

== Artivism ==
Gonzalez trains other local Los Angeles-based artists in the Collective Songwriting method, and she works with The Alliance for California Traditional Arts (ACTA) on implementing the method.

== Awards ==
2022, Gonzalez was named a MacArthur Fellow by the MacArthur Foundation.

2025 Alta Fellow. “Alta: A Human Atlas of The City of Los Angeles Project: Featuring 100 Most Influential Angelenos.” The Getty, PST ART: Art and Science Collide curated by Marcus Lyon.

2024 Edith Perez Angel Award. Latino Theater Company. CA

2022 John D. and Catherine T. MacArthur Foundation Fellow. CA.

2020 United States Artist (USA). Recipient in Music. Los Angeles

2013- Grammy Award, "Best Latin Rock Alternative Album" for "Imaginaries" on Smithsonian Folkways Records.

== Personal life ==
Gonzalez is the middle of four children, born in Los Angeles to parents who had immigrated from Guadalajara, Jalisco, Mexico. Gonzalez and her siblings grew up singing in East Los Angeles. She is married to her Quetzal bandmate Quetzal Flores, and they have a child together.

== Selected research and publications ==
- 2014: “Creating a Mexican-AfroCuban American Beat” in What It Means to be American
- 2014: “Mixing in the Kitchen: Entre Mujeres Feminine Translocal Composition” in Performing Motherhood, Demeter Press, ISBN 978-1-927335-92-5
- 2014:: A de activista, Triangle Square, ISBN 978-1-60980-569-2
- 2015: “Sobreviviendo: Immigration Stories and Testimonio in Song” Center for Latino Research at University of De Paul University.
- 2020: Chican@ Artivistas: Music, Community, and Transborder Tactics in East Los Angeles, University of Texas Press, ISBN 978-1-4773-2113-3 2024 Artivistas Chicanos: Musica, Comunidad y Tacticas Transfronterizas. Spanish Translation of Chican@ Artivistas: Music, Community and Transborder Tactics. Editorial Interpec. Mexico City, Mexico. 2022 “Convivencias and a Web of Care,” with Kevin Shorner-Johnson and Daniel John-Shevock. The Oxford Handbook of Care in Music Education. Fall. 2020 “Maña Magic: Chicana Feminist Praxis, In the Home, At Large and Behind Bars.” Aztlan: Journal of Chicano Studies v45 n1 (20200301): 171 – 183 University of California Press. Los Angeles, CA.
