= Son Armado =

Mexican-American cultural organization

Son Armado is a Mexican-American cultural organization dedicated to the proliferation of the Son Jarocho Fandango, an education-based art form that revolves around celebrations and community gatherings known as Fandangos. Son Armado is based in Austin, Texas.

== History ==
When describing Son Jarocho, founder Alexis Herrera said, “Historically speaking, Son Jarocho was something that was a celebration, a way for people to get together to share themselves and take a break from the day-to-day life, and to sing about it in these poetic ways; dance it out, share food, share drink, and experience through this art form." The Fandango involves things like dancing, poetry, and music. This all takes place on a tarima. A tarima, is a wooden dance platform. The Son Jarocho is folkloric music that comes from Spanish, Arabic and African cultures. These cultures came together in Veracruz for first time, and was later made into a movement by founder Carolina Sarmiento and its members. To play the Son Jarocho, one must use a jarana, which is a small eight-string instrument. The Son Jarocho was originally only performed by men, but that was changed by the Son Armado as part of their feminist movement.
