= Cambalache (disambiguation) =

"Cambalache" is a 1934 tango by Enrique Santos Discépolo.

Cambalache may also refer to:

- Cambalache, Arecibo, Puerto Rico, a barrio
- Cambalache (band), a musical group from Los Angeles, California
