= Son jarocho =

Regional Mexican Son music from Veracruz

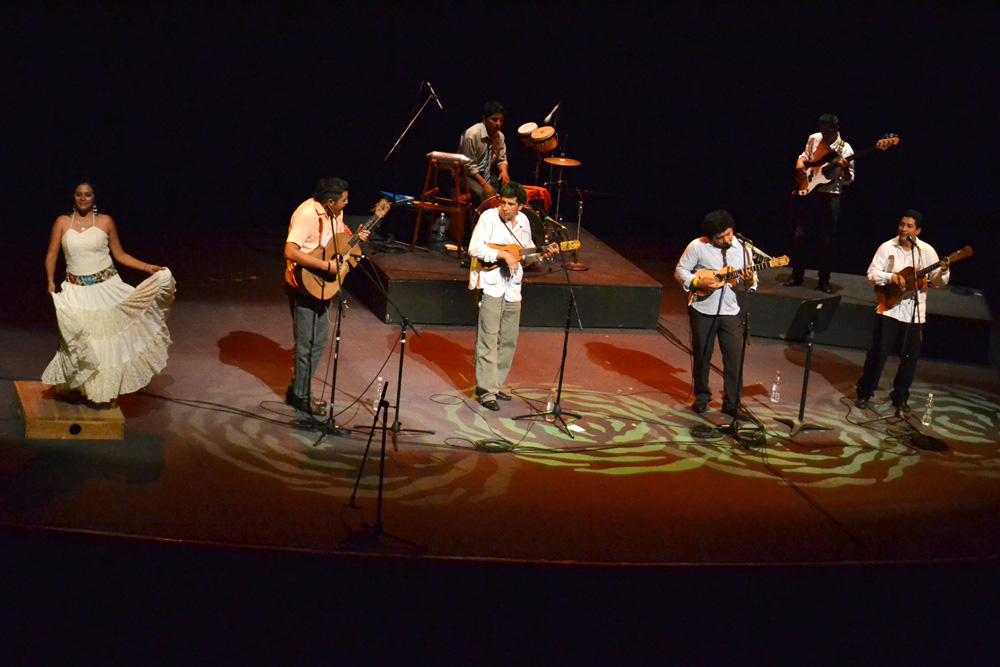
- Los Cojolites musical ensemble
- Stylistic origins: Baroque Andalusian folklore (fandango), Music of West Africa, Indigenous Music of Mexico
- Cultural origins: 18th century Veracruz
- Typical instruments: vocals, requinto, jarana, arpa jarocha, leona, pandero, quijada, marimbol
- Derivative forms: Related genres: Cuban punto, Cuban guajira, Venezuelan and Colombian joropo, Panamanian mejorana, Peruvian zamacueca, Chilean cueca

Other topics
- Charro – Jarabe tapatío – Zapateado-Mariachi-Huapango-Son Huasteco

Son jarocho ("Veracruz Sound") is a regional folk musical style of Mexican Son from Veracruz, a Mexican state along the Gulf of Mexico. It evolved over the last two and a half centuries along the coastal portions of southern Tamaulipas state and Veracruz state, hence the term jarocho, a colloquial term for people or things from the port city of Veracruz.

== Characteristics ==
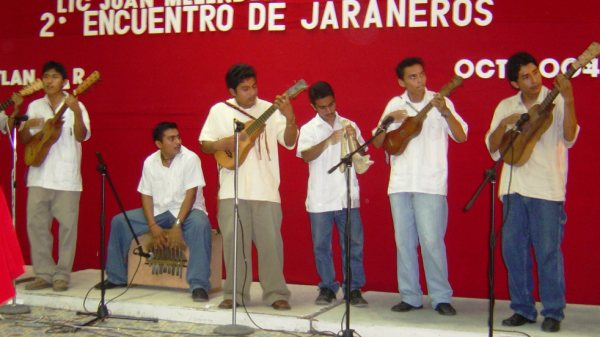
Son jarocho group

The genre combines elements from indigenous (primarily Huastecan), Baroque music from Southern Spain (fandango) and the Western African music of slaves taken to the Caribbean; reflecting the population which evolved in the region from Spanish colonial times. It is closely related to several other genres in 6/8 meter which appeared throughout Hispanic America from the 17th to the 19th century; such as the Cuban son, the Venezuelan and Colombian joropo and the Chilean cueca.

Lyrics include humorous verses and subjects such as love, nature, sailors, and cattle breeding that still reflect life in colonial and 19th century Mexico. Verses are often repeated in antimetabole form. Verses are often shared with the wider Mexican and Hispanic Caribbean repertoire and some have even been borrowed from famous works by writers of the Spanish "Siglo de Oro". It is usually performed by an ensemble of musicians and instruments which collectively are termed a "conjunto jarocho". Son jarocho is often played only on jaranas and sung in a style in which several singers exchange improvised verses called décimas, often with humorous or risqué content. The high-pitched falsetto singing is likely of indigenous origin.

== Instruments ==
Musical piece inspired by son jarocho.

The instruments most commonly associated with son jarocho are the jarana jarocha, a small guitar-like instrument used to provide a harmonic base, with some double strings arranged in a variety of configurations; the requinto jarocho, another small guitar-like instrument plucked with a long pick traditionally made from cow-horn, usually tuned to a higher pitch and with a four or five thick nylon strings; the diatonic arpa jarocha; the leona, a type of acoustic bass guitar; the tarima, an idiophone percussion instrument that consists of a wooden platform on which people tap their heels, and sometimes a minor complement of percussion instruments such as the pandero (especially in the style of Tlacotalpan), the quijada (an instrument made of a donkey or horse jawbone) or the güiro. Some groups add the marimbol, a plucked key box bass, and the cajón (although the Peruvian version, not the Mexican cajón de tapeo).

== Sones and groups ==
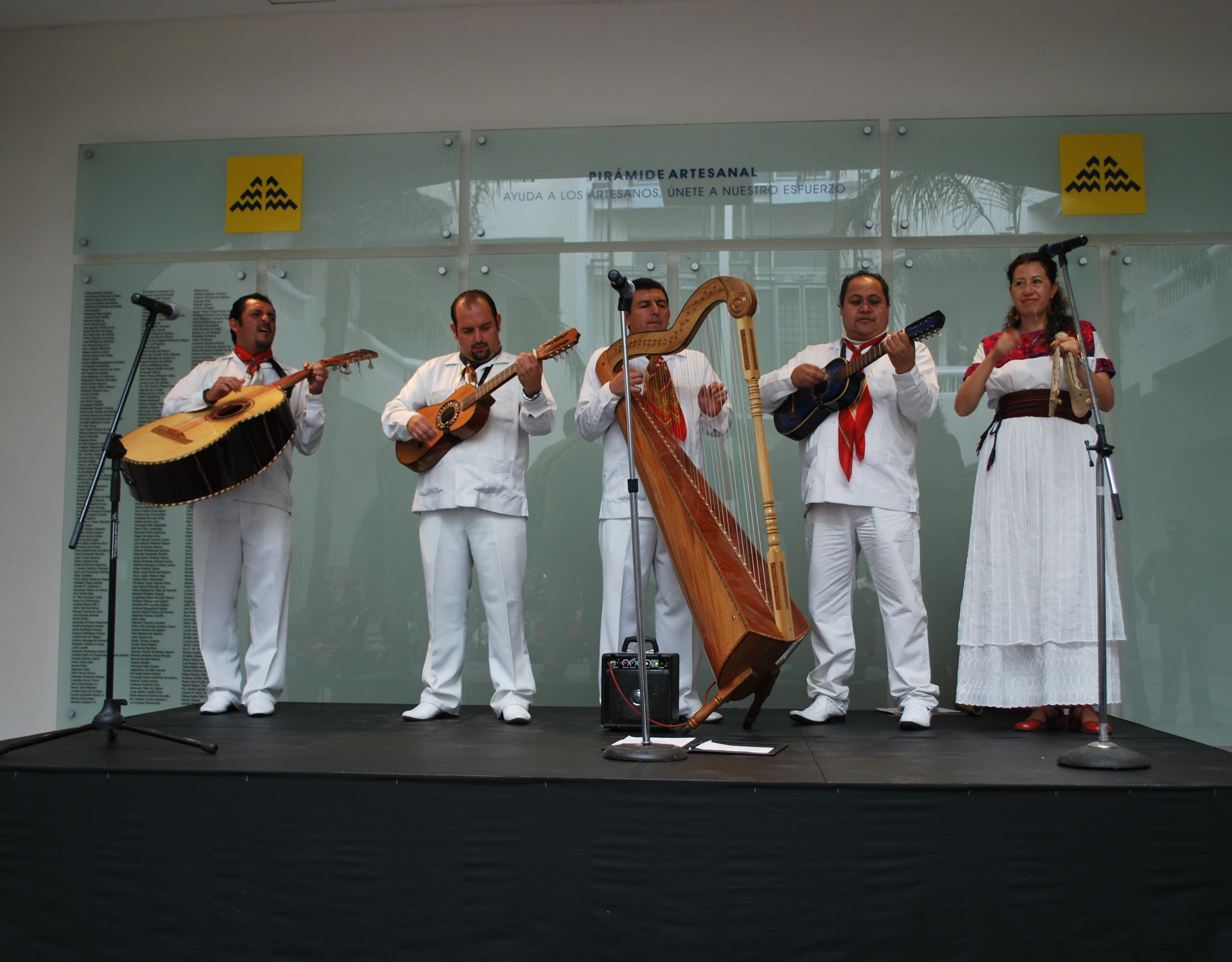
Son Jarocho group Zarahuato performing at the Museo de Arte Popular.

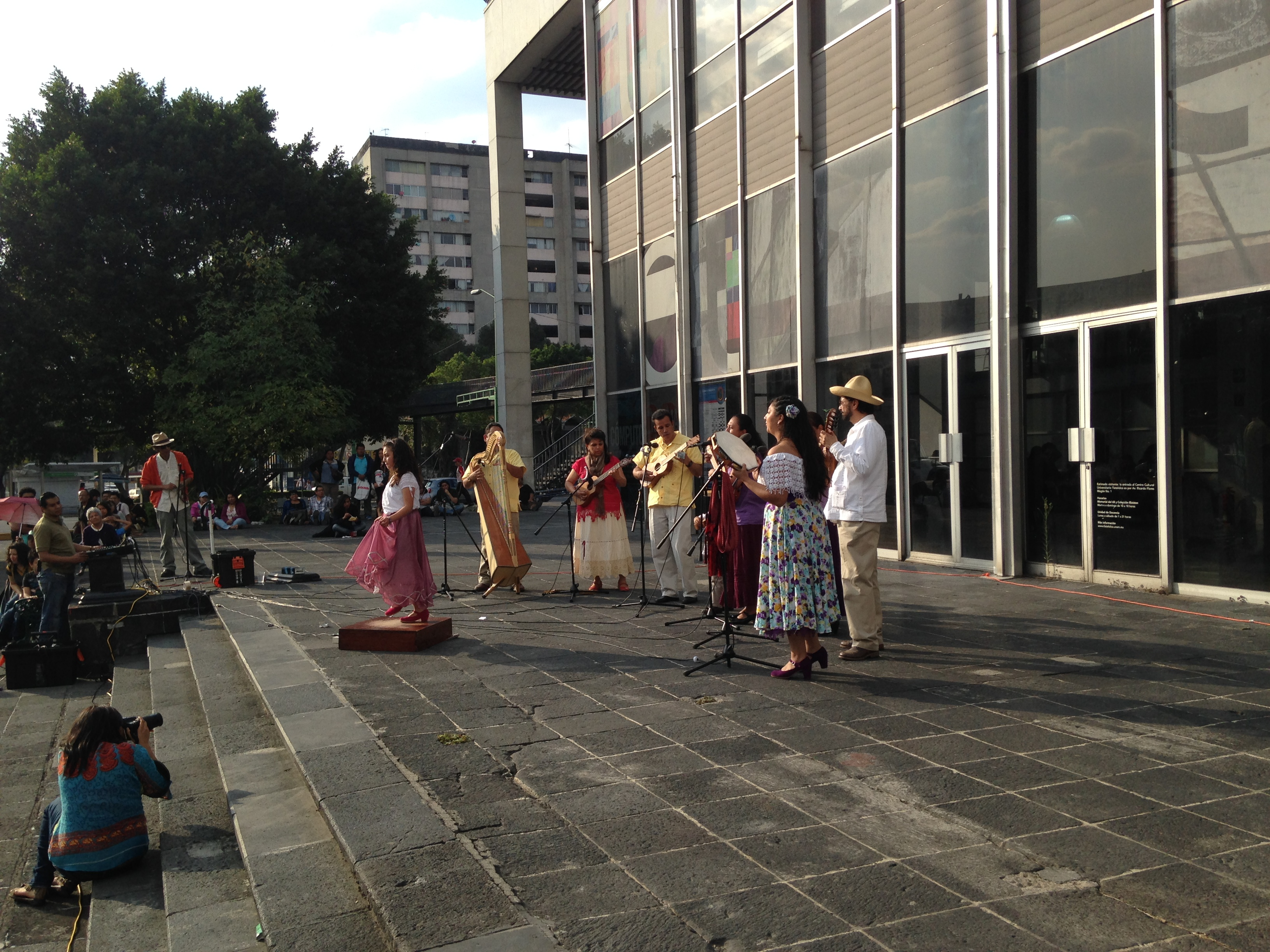
Representation of traditional dance

The most widely known son jarocho is "La Bamba", which has been popularized through the version by Ritchie Valens and the American movie of the same name. Other famous sones jarochos are "El Coco" and "La Iguana" and "El Cascabel", all of which have a call and response form, and "El Chuchumbé", "La Bruja".

Fermin Herrera (a Jarocho harpist) has taught many people, such as John Robles and Antonio Moraza, how to play. Because of him, many groups in the US play or even know about son jarocho. More recently, instruments and rhythms from son jarocho have been used by rock groups such as Café Tacuba, Quetzal, 22 Pesos, Ozomatli, and Zack de la Rocha. East L.A. rockers Los Lobos have also recorded in the Jarocho genre, as has Mexican-American artist Lila Downs. More recently son jarocho music has experienced a resurgence in the United States. US-based bands now playing (as of 2012) or using elements of the genre include Radio Jarocho, David Wax Museum, Cambalache, Son del Centro, Las Cafeteras, Son del Viento, Los Cenzontles and Jarana Beat.

Related genres include son huasteco, huapango, son jaliscience, and son chiapaneco.

Well-known artists playing the genre include Natalia Lafourcade, Conjunto Hueyapan, Mono Blanco, Siquisirí, Tlen Huicani, Chuchumbé, Chucumite, Son de Madera, Los Vega and Los Cojolites, the first Son Jarocho group to be nominated for a Grammy Award.
