= Leona (instrument) =

Mexican string instrument

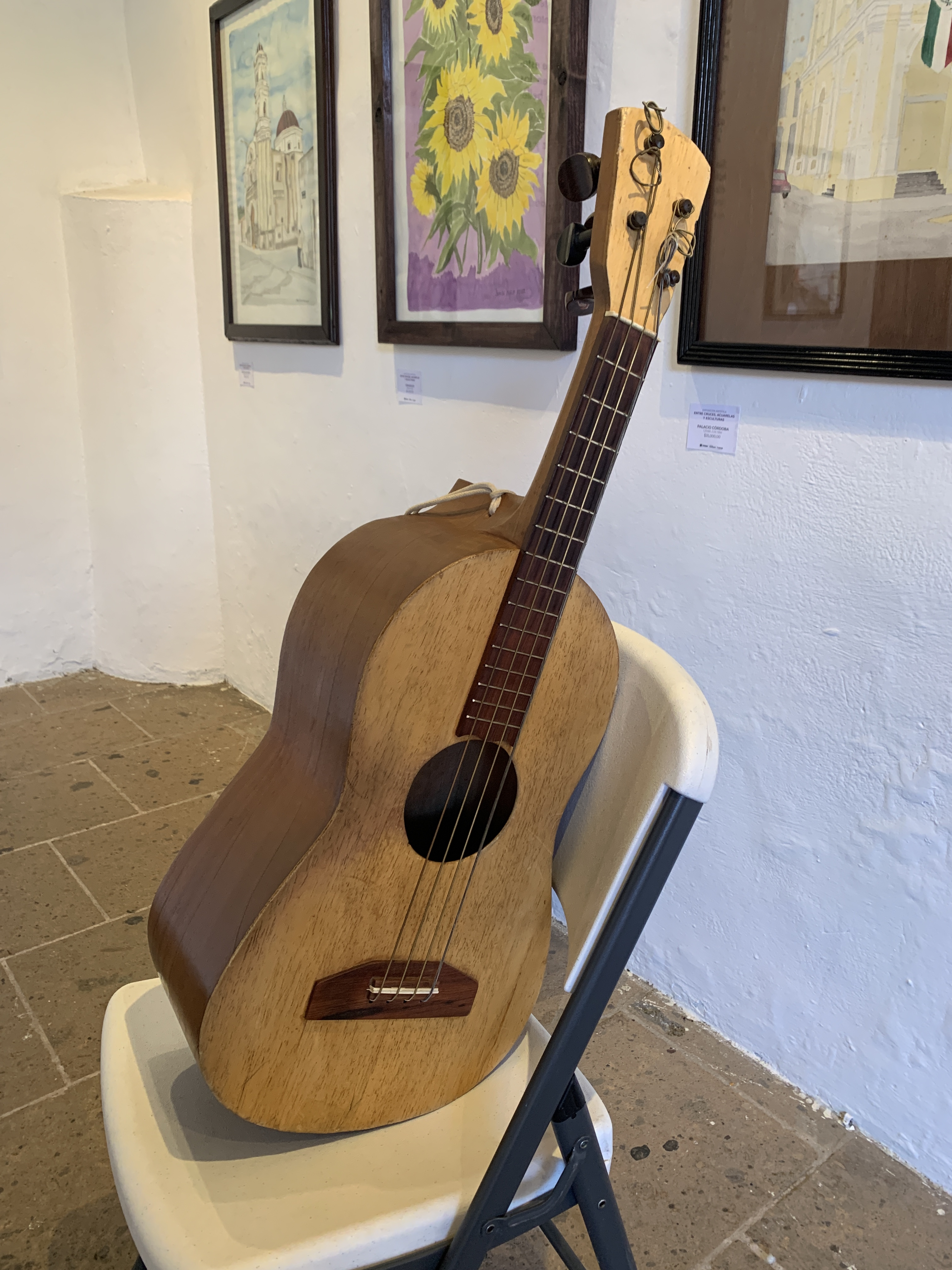
Leona.

The leona is a guitar-shaped fretted stringed instrument, from the state of Veracruz, Mexico. It has four strings and is a low pitched instrument in the son jarocho string family of instruments. The león or vozarrona, bigger than the former, is the lowest instrument in son jarocho genre.

The body of a leona is traditionally carved from a single piece of wood (traditionally Spanish cedar) and it is then hollowed out, with a separate soundboard and fingerboard applied. Other Mexican and South American folk guitars derivative of Spanish instruments are also made this way, notably the charango of Bolivia.

Sound example of leona instrument
