= Arpa jarocha =

Mexican harp

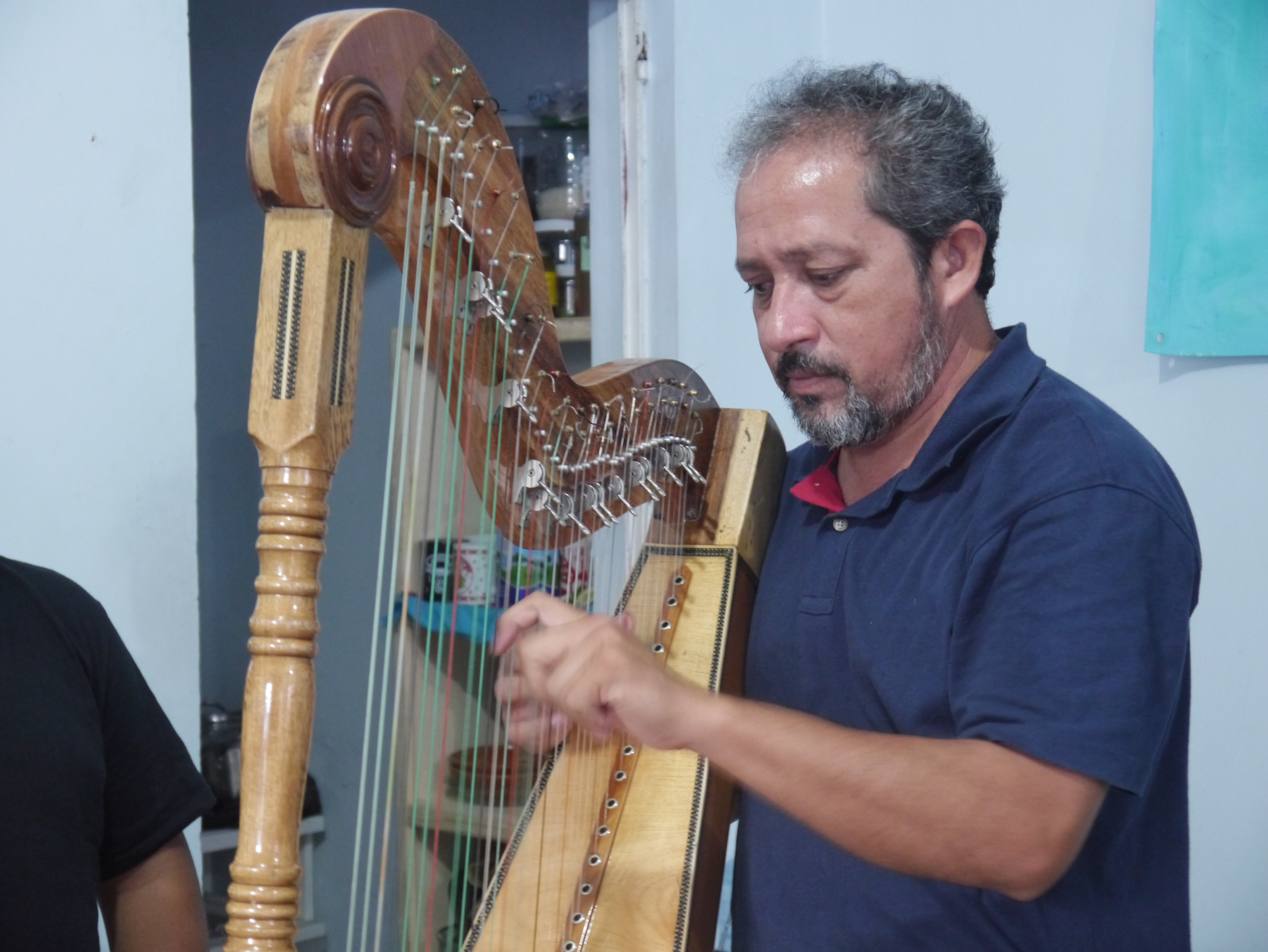

String instrument
- Classification: chordophone
- Volume: Loud
- Attack: Fast
- Decay: Medium

Related instruments
- Harp

The arpa jarocha is a large wooden harp that is normally played while standing, although early examples from the 16th through the first three or four decades of the 19th centuries were smaller and were played while seated. It has a wooden frame, a resonator, a flat soundboard, 32-36 nylon strings (originally, gut strings), and does not have pedals. This harp is tuned diatonically over five octaves. The top of its soundboard sometimes arches outward due to the tension of the strings. Unlike other Mexican harps, the arpa jarocha has its sound holes located on the back of the soundboard instead of on the front.

== Playing technique ==
As previously stated, the arpa jarocha was once commonly played while seated, similarly to its ancestor the Spanish harp from the 16th century. In modern times, since approximately the 1940s, the arpa jarocha has been built in a larger scale, following the general pattern of the Western Mexican harps from Jalisco and Michoacán. One of the first recording artists of the genre, Andrés Huesca (1917-1957), actually used a Michoacán harp, due to its better volume for recording. The performer uses one hand to play the bass line on the low strings, and uses the other hand to play arpeggiated melodies on the higher strings. The soundboard has also been known to be used as a percussive device, though this is rare. That practice is common in the Tierra Caliente groups of Michoacan, however.

== Use ==
The arpa is one of the main instruments used in the conjunto jarocho; a type of Mexican folk ensemble. The musical style in which arpa jarocha is also heard is "sones jarochos," which blends Spanish, indigenous and African-influenced rhythms. Within this genre, the arpa typically provides the main melodies, while instruments such as the jarana guitar and the requinto provide rhythms and counter-melodies.

Both men and women play this instrument, although a greater percentage are men.

== Origins ==
The arpa jarocha is from Veracruz, Mexico. one of the various forms of harp that evolved from models introduced by Spain in the 16th century, and traced even back further to the Arabs who had occupied Spain for 700 years.

The indigenous people of Veracruz had never seen stringed instruments before the Conquest, and quickly adapted their own version which became a pivotal instrument used in many different musical ensembles in Veracruz, but also the rest of Mexico and Latin America.

== Misconceptions ==
Some references have stated that the arpa jarocha was used in Jalisco, Michoacán, and among the Chamula Indians; this is incorrect. Each of those regions developed their own adaptation of the baroque Spanish harp. Also, there were regional harps in Zacatecas and in the North with the Yaqui Indians of the northern desert and southwest US.

== Similar instruments ==
There are multiple variations of the arpa, depending on where it comes from. The arpa llanera, arpa aragüeña, and arpa criolla originate from Venezuela, the arpa indígena originates from Peru, and the arpa paraguaya originates from Paraguay.

== See also ==
- Harp
- Veracruz dance and music
- Latin American music
