= Jarocho =

Resident or item from the Mexican state of Veracruz

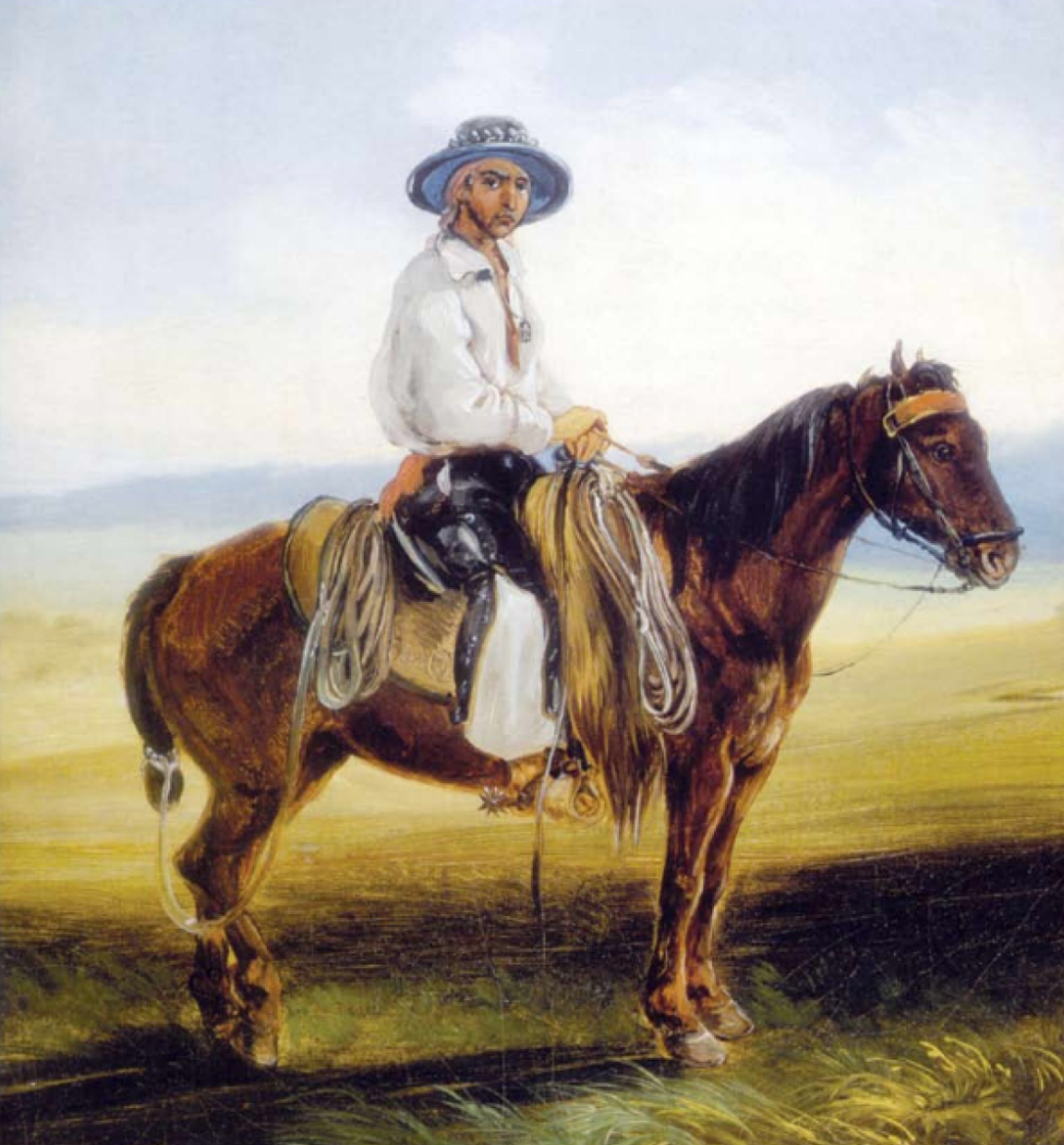
Jarocho de Tierra Caliente (Jarocho of the Hot Lands) (1838)

Jarocho was, historically, the horseman of the Veracruz countryside, who worked on the haciendas of the state, specifically those dedicated to the job of vaquero (cowherd) and everything related to cattle ranching. Jarocho was for Veracruz and its “Tierra-Caliente” (Hot Lands, coastal areas) what Ranchero or Charro was for the Mexican Highlands and interior of the country. Synonymous with vaquero, horseman and country man.

There are also several instances where the term appears without the explicit relationship with Veracruz or its inhabitants, appearing as a generic demonym for all rural inhabitants regardless of origin, a fact that would make it synonymous with Ranchero or Charro. The term was also used synonymously with mulatto and black people.

Nowadays the term has lost its original meaning as it is no longer related to cowboys, horsemen, ranching or country people. Currently “Jarocho” is used as a colloquial demonym for all inhabitants of the state of Veracruz regardless of their occupation, as well as an appellative term for anything related to said state.

== Etymology ==
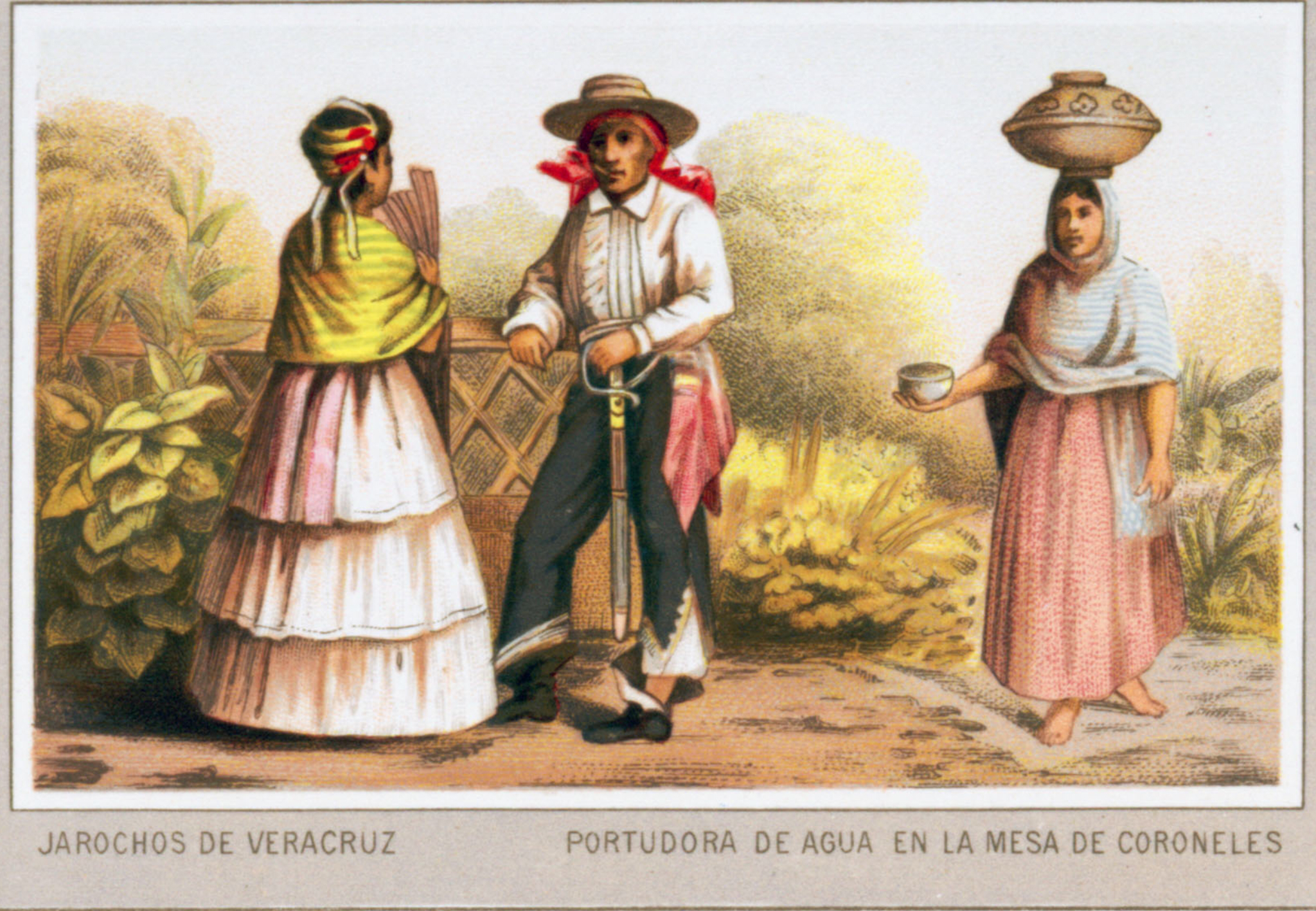
Jarochos de Veracruz (1885).

Most scholars agree that the term Jarocho comes from the Arabic term jara meaning spear or arrow, referring to the spear or lance used by the vaqueros of Veracruz for herding cattle.

The French colonist and writer, Lucien Biart, who lived in Mexico (1846 to 1867), wrote in 1862 that it was the people of the Mexican Highlands (the Temperate-Land) who called the vaqueros and cattle ranchers of Veracruz “Jarochos” for using spears or lances, called “jarochas” by them, for herding cattle:

Nous rassemblons plus d'un millier de têtes, puis nous cherchons à franchir la savane avec cet immense troupeau pour gagner les premières pentes des montagnes. […] Les conducteurs, dans ces expéditions, sont armés de longues lances nommées jarochas; de là le nom familier de Jarochos qu'on leur donne dans les hautes terres, et que la plupart de mes compatriotes ignorent.

We gathered more than a thousand head of cattle, then we try to cross the plains with this immense herd to reach the first slopes of the mountains. […] The leaders, in these expeditions, are armed with long spears called jarochas; hence the familiar name of Jarochos which is given to them in the highlands, and which most of my compatriots are unaware of.

— La Terre Chaude: Scenes de moers mexicaines (1862)

The 19th century scholar José Miguel Macías was the first to propose, in 1884, that jarocho came from the Arabic term jara, a type of spear or lance with an arrow shaped tip used for cattle herding. Unlike the vaqueros of the Mexican Highlands, the Charros, who used a lasso called a reata for herding cattle, the Jarochos used a lance or spear colloquially called “jarocha”. It is probable, according to this theory, that by using said “jara” or “jarocha”, the Veracruz cowboys and ranchers were nicknamed, in a derogatory manner, “Jarochos”, as Biart mentions.

On the contrary, Macías himself proposed an alternative theory that suggested that the term could come from jaro, an adjective that was applied to pigs that looked like wild boars due to the reddish color and hardness of their bristles. It is probable, according to this other theory, that out of hatred for black people, the suffix -cho was added to insult black, mulatto and zambo men, insinuating that they were swine, a theory that has been taken up by modern scholars. The majority of the Jarocho population was made up of people of Afro-descent.

However, the Cuban-Mexican professor, Félix Ramos y Duarte, argued in his —Diccionario de Mejicanismos (1895)— that Jarocho came from jara, which, according to him, means hair or shag, alluding to the "shaggy" or unkept appearance of country men.

=== Use of the term ===
Since at least the 18th century, the term Jarocho has been associated in one way or another with country people. The oldest instances of the word that have been found show that jarocho was used as a name or demonym for rural people, regardless of geographical origin. Implying that it was synonymous with ranchero, charro, or countryman.

The oldest instance that scholars have been able to find where the word is specifically related to Veracruz was in two documents, letters written and dated February 13, 1822, by Governor Manuel Rincón to Emperor Agustín de Iturbide. In them he mentions Mariano Cenobio and Crisanto Castro, captains of an army of Jarochos, to capture Guadalupe Victoria, since they were friends of his.

Today, the term is applied to all people from the city of Veracruz regardless of their occupation. In a more restricted way, its use is limited to the southern coastal regions of the state, more particularly, to farmers and fishermen living along the valley of the Papaloapan river, specially those in or near the towns of Cosamaloapan, Tlacotalpan, and Alvarado.

Musical groups of jarochos are bands of minstrel musicians, who dress and play in the Veracruz style. They are distinguished by their traditional white guayabera shirts and white pants and hats; also the men wear a red bandana around their neck. Music played by jarochos is known as Son Jarocho.

== History ==
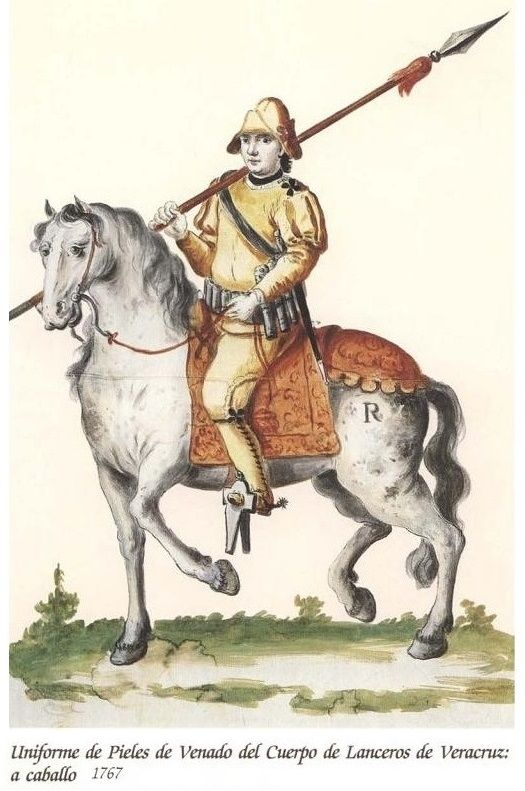
Lancero de Veracruz (1767). Veracruz Militiaman with lance.

The origin of the Jarochos dates back to the 16th century with the introduction of cattle ranching to Veracruz. From its beginnings, cattle ranching in the region had extraordinary success with a rapid multiplication of livestock, that is estimated that by the year 1630, just in the Sotavento region alone, cattle had quintupled from half a million head in 1570 to two and a half million head of cattle. It is there where men, mainly black, mulattos and zambos, provided their services on the cattle ranches, working mainly as cowboys (vaqueros) and foremen (mayorales). These same cowboys also made up the militias that protected the seaport and the region. As militiamen, they armed themselves with the same lances or spears that they used for herding cattle.

It is these cowboys and militiamen of black descent from the Tierra-Caliente of Veracruz that towards the 19th century, once the Independence of Mexico was consummated, began to be known under the term of Jarochos, a derogatory nickname that originated because they used those lances, colloquially known as jarochas, for herding cattle.

British politician and writer, Charles Lempriere, wrote in 1862 that Jarochos were:

“The Jarochos are mulattos. They all ride magnificently, and are employed as herdsmen to the vast droves of cattle which covered the Tierras Calientes.”

The true Jarochos were not involved in farming or in any other rural job other than cattle ranching, because according to 19th century writer Angel Vélez, they considered those other occupations as monotonous and very “laborious”.

Niceto de Zamacois, a Spanish historian and journalist based in Mexico, explained that the Jarochos were for Veracruz what the Rancheros were for the Highlands and interior of the country:

“In the interior provinces of Mexico, in the cold and temperate territories, the men of the countryside who carry out their jobs on horseback are given the name of «Rancheros», derived from the word Rancho that is applied to a small hacienda, or to a part of a large one that is divided into rancherias or ranchos. Those who carry out the same tasks in the haciedas of Veracruz are given the name of «Jarochos».

The Jarochos were, therefore, very different from the Charros, not only in their customs but also in their techniques for herding cattle as well as in their costume.

The Jarochos didn’t wear cowboy boots like the Charros of the interior, typically riding their horses barefoot, inserting only the big toe in the stirrup, with their body leaning to one side, resting one thigh on the saddle, and not astride. They also didn’t use the typical Mexican vaquero saddle that the Charros used, but rather a heavy, crude saddle, with long corazas (embossed leather covering), without tapaderas (stirrup coverings) on the stirrups, and overloaded with ornaments. Their saddles also had no saddlehorn, since, as already mentioned, they didn’t use roping as their primary method for cattle herding, but rather a lance or spear. Their secondary tool was a lasso, which, unlike the reata of the Charros, was called "peal" and was tied to their horse's tail, and was made of twisted, not braided, rawhide, dried in the sun and softened with tallow; and unlike the Charros of the interior, the Jarochos didn’t rope with the same skill and agility as them.

Another of their peculiarities was the use of the machete, his favorite and indispensable weapon, which he always carried in a sheath attached to his waist, never on his horse like the Charros did. The Jarochos were known for their agility in handling the machete, especially in dodging blows. Ángel Vélez, a 19th century writer from Veracruz, commented that the machete was an indispensable tool and weapon for the Jarochos, and that for them, being without their machete was worse than being naked.

Gabriel Ferry, a French writer and explorer who lived in Mexico for ten years, wrote that for a Jarocho any comment, no matter how insignificant, was enough to provoke him into a fight:

“It is their love of independence which causes them to prefer the wandering life of the herdsman [vaquero] and the horse-dealer, and the machete plays no unimportant part in all their difficulties. The Jarocho would rather want the most indispensable part of his dress than be deprived of the long sharp glittering blade which he wears in his belt. This sabre is more generally in the hand of the Jarocho than at his side. A small point of honour, or the most futile remark has often been the means of bringing on the most bloody and long-continued series of combats.”

Besides being countrymen and being heavily involved in cattle ranching working as vaqueros, the only other similarity Jarochos had with the Charros was their horsemanship and their athleticism and physical strength.

== Traditional costume ==
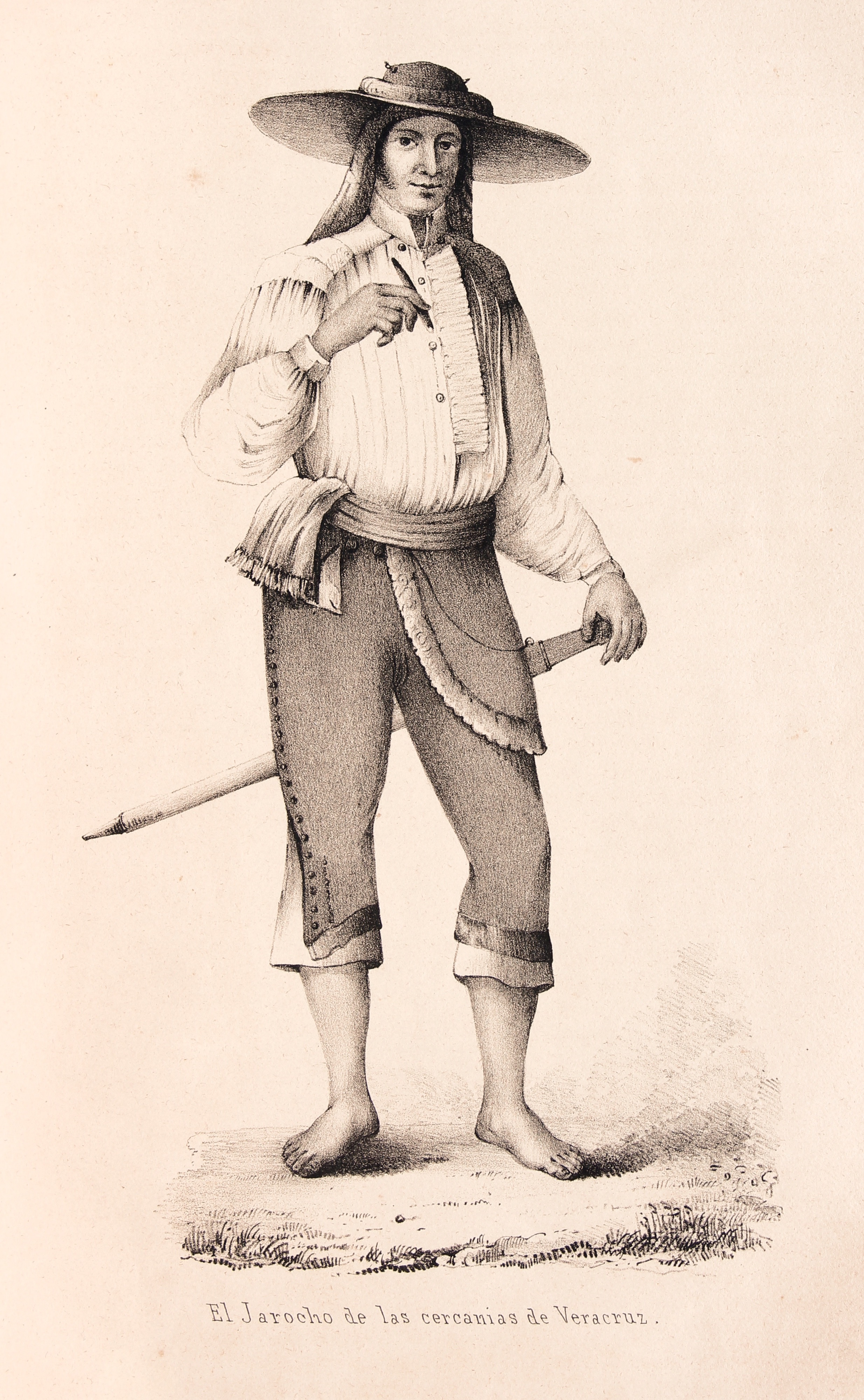
Jarocho from the surroundings of Veracruz (1844)

The typical historical costume of the Jarochos was very different from that of the Charros, and very different from the “Jarocho” costume of today. The costume consisted of a wide brimmed palm hat with a low crown and with the brim raised at the back. A white linen shirt with cambric trim. Short velveteen breeches reaching down to the knees, and opened at the sides with button. They didn’t wear cowboy boots, usually being barefoot, nor did they usually wear spurs. Only on special occasions did they wear ankle boots. And, hanging from a cloth or leather sash around their waist, their sword, the machete.

Gabriel Ferry wrote that the main common attire of the Jarocho men, consisted of:

“He wore in all its purity the peculiar costume of this class of men, a straw hat with a broad brim turned up behind, a fine linen shirt with cambric frills, without any vest above it, a pair of blue cotton velvet breeches open at the knee, and falling in a point to the middle of his leg. In a belt of Chinese crape of a scarlet colour, hung a straight sword (machete) without guard or sheath, the sharp and glittering blade of which sparkled in the sun. His feet, which were bare, were held in the wooden stirrup only by the tips of his toes. This Jarocho, his head inclined indolently upon one shoulder, sat his horse in the attitude peculiar to people of his caste, whose easy manner and unconstrained demeanour suited him to perfection.”

When they were herding cattle out in the woods and mountains, their only protection on their legs was a pair of leggings called “Botas Huastecas” (Huastec Boots), a kind of wide leggings or breeches, similar to Chaps used by the Charros, made of deer skin tanned with putrefied brains and smoked with cobs, to protect them from thorns and snakes, and repel chiggers, ticks and other bugs with the putrid smell.

The manufacturing process for making "Botas Huastecas" consisted, according to an article published in 1869, in:

“The boots, which are not boots but leggings, since they don’t have soles, nor are they worn on the feet, are made of the skins of two deer, which are arranged so that the respective neck of each one serves to cover the calves and part of the thighs, and they are tied to the waist with cords of the same skin. The way to prepare the skin is as follows: the animal's brains are saved until they enter a state of putrefaction; the skins are then greased with this ointment, after being previously dried in the sun on the hairy side, and is then rubbed with a deer rib and becomes soft under this operation. When it is soft enough, it is colored with the smoke of burnt corn husks. The purpose of this is to impregnate the skin with a strong and pungent odor, which prevents ticks from adhering to them. The boots must be very wide and form many folds and wrinkles, both to avoid thorns from penetrating them, and to escape from the bite of snakes when having to cross bushy places.”

Lucien Biart mentioned that they also wore, draped over their shoulders, a “sailor” shirt, usually made of blue wool, which they put on before sunrise and after sunset. He also said that some old time Jarochos stuck to wearing a type of dress or long tunic with sleeves that fell down to the feet, that was decorated at all the seams with red threads forming strange designs. This garment, according to Biart, began to fall into disuse among the Jarochos around the 1830s.

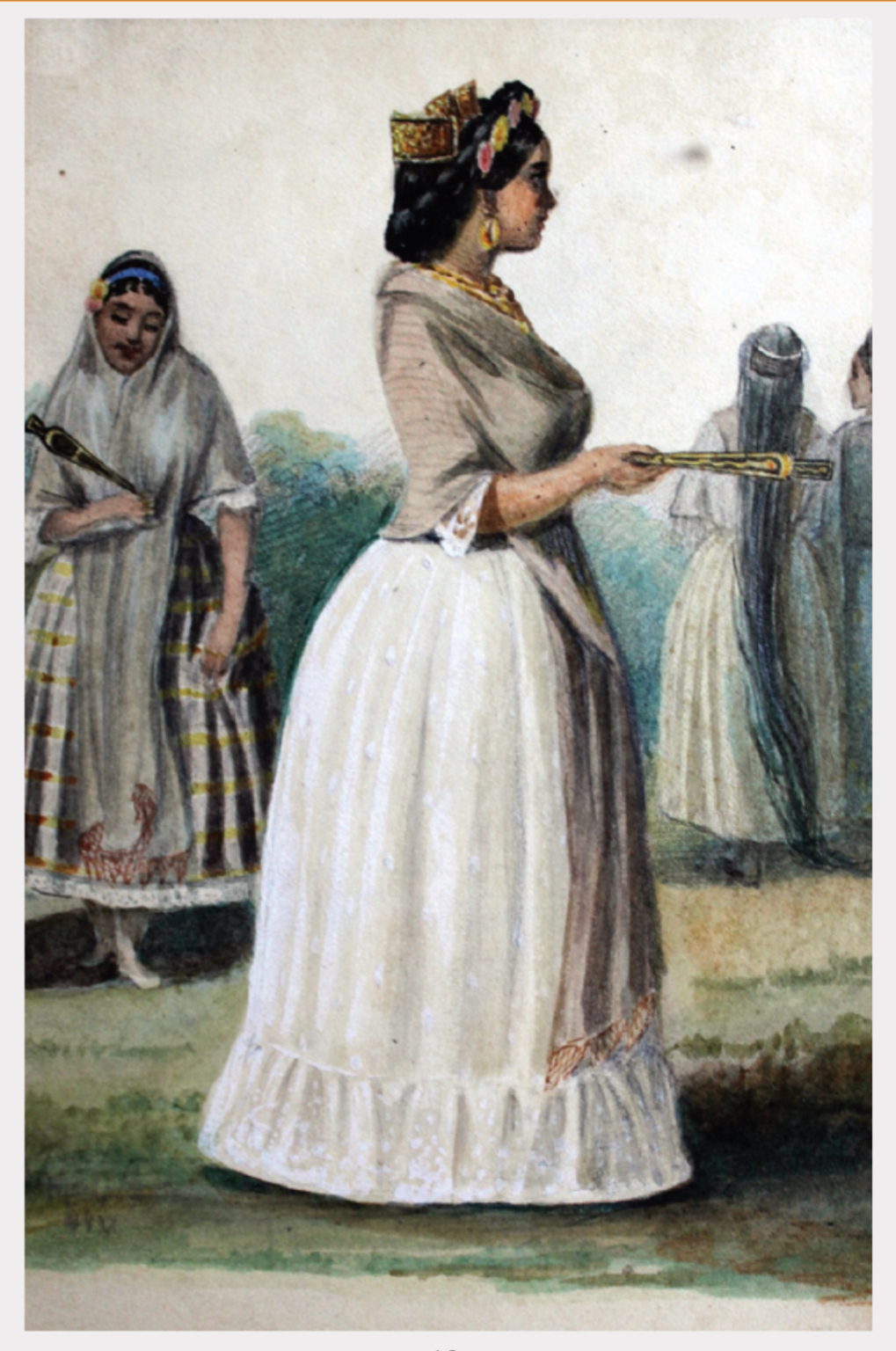
Young Jarocho Woman (1838)

Among Jarocho women, Biart mentions that they wore a low-cut blouse, a petticoat, the national peineta (cachirulo) on their heads, and shoes that barely covered the tips of their bare feet and which hit the ground loudly with every step. He said that at that time (1830s) the dress, the stockings, the shawl were recent imports, which were not yet widespread among the population; but he already foresaw that its use would become more widespread to establish a clearer line between social classes, since in the past the ladies of the upper class were only distinguished from the women of the lower class by greater wealth in the fabrics used in their dress and stockings.

The “elegant” costume of the Jarochos differed a little from the common one, since the wearer usually wore ankle boots, and its fabric and manufacturing was more expensive. The French painter Pharamond Blanchard said that the elegant costume of the Jarochos consisted of:

“White trousers of fine cotton fabric, open at the sides from the middle of the thigh; a pleated shirt all around the body, a huge wide-brimmed hat of white felt, and boots richly embroidered with arabesques of extraordinary fineness: this is the costume of the elegant country people. Almost all of them are armed with the machete, a straight sword of medium length, which serves several purposes, in addition to their personal defense; It is with this weapon that they open a path in the middle of the thickest forests.”

Regarding the costume of the Jarocho women, Blanchard mentioned that it was much simpler, consisting of a very low-cut blouse; a white petticoat at the bottom edge, and the rest of indigo blue, the both legs and feet bare; When they traveled, they covered their heads with a shawl or scarf, which they called reboso, with blue and white checkered designs, made of light wool or cotton fabric.

=== Modern-day attire ===
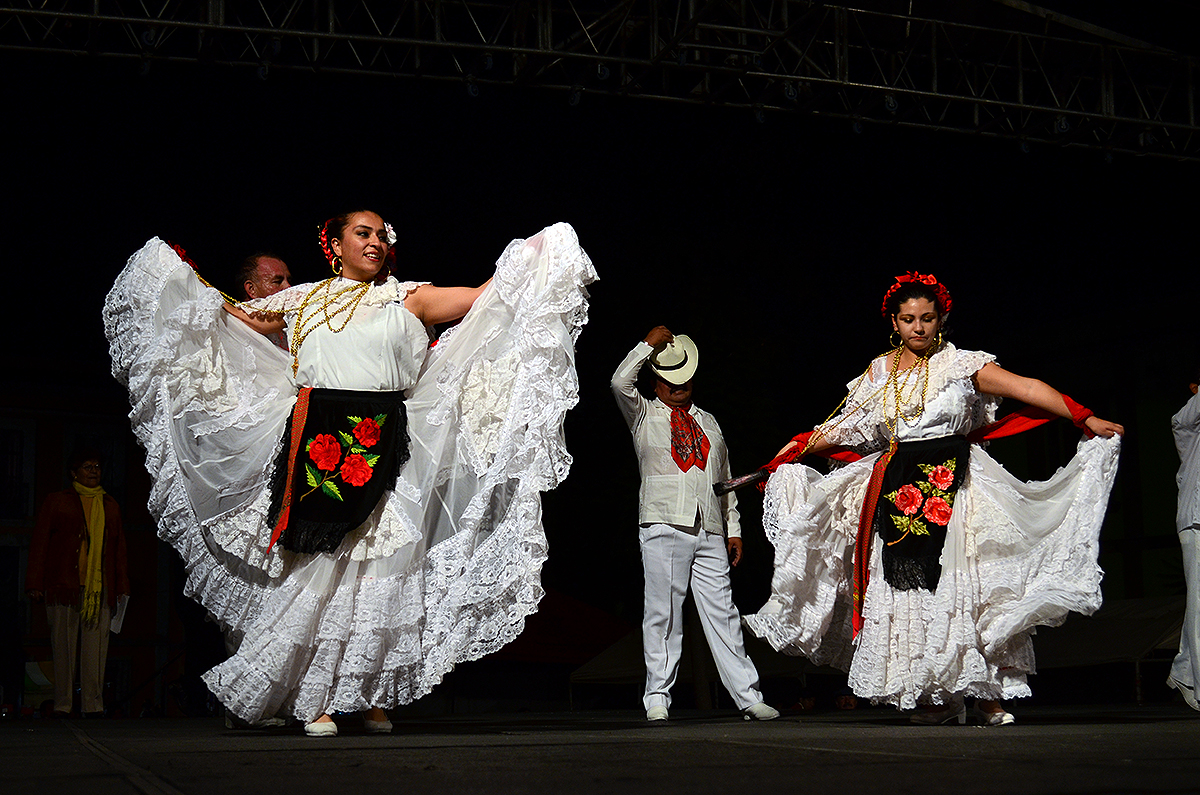
Current Jarocho and Jarocha costumes.

The current typical costume of the Jarochos has little or nothing to do with the original ancient costume, since today the term Jarocho no longer has anything to do with the cowboys of Veracruz.

The typical modern day costume of the Jarocho men consists of a white guayabera shirt, with red bandana around the neck and tied in front with a golden ring; white pants, white ankle boots, and a small white palm hat. In the case of women, there is also a stereotype in which white clothing predominates, wide skirts with edges and lace (blouse, skirt, petticoat, scarf and shoes).

== See also ==
- Charro
- Vaquero
- Cowboy
- Son jarocho
- Mexican Spanish
