= Requinto jarocho =

Mexican plucked string instrument

requinto jarocho
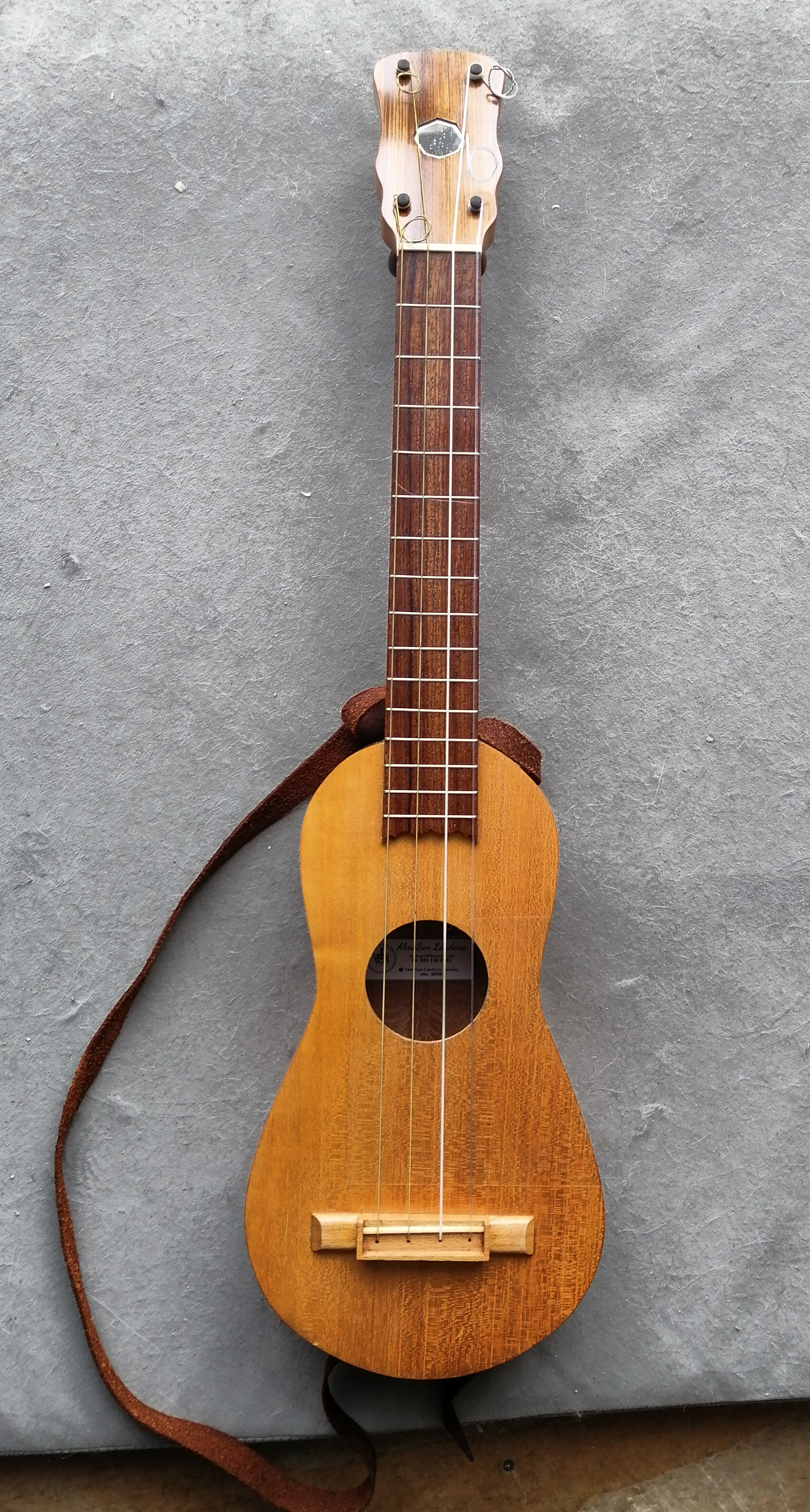
- A requinto jarocho with plastic and metal strings

String instrument
- Classification: (plucked)
- Hornbostel–Sachs classification: (Composite chordophone)
- Developed: 16th century

Related instruments
- Bowed and plucked string instruments

Sound sample

The requinto jarocho or guitarra de son is plucked string instrument, played usually with a special pick. It is a four- or five-stringed instrument that originated from Veracruz, Mexico. The requinto is used in conjunto jarocho ensembles. In the absence of the arpa, the requinto typically introduces the melodic theme of the son and then continues by providing a largely improvised counterpoint to the vocal line.

== Characteristics ==
The requinto jarocho is shaped like a guitar with a small body. The body, neck and tuning head is made from one piece of wood. It has a shallow body, and a slightly raised fingerboard. It also has 12 frets.

The four-stringed requinto jarocho can follow the standard tuning of (ADGc), but is also commonly tuned to GADg and CDGc. The five-stringed requinto, however, adds a string above the standard tuning 5 half-steps below the initial first string, making it EADGc.

The requinto jarocho strings are made of nylon; when played it sounds like the bottom four strings of a classical guitar.

== Classification ==
According to the work of researcher Francisco García Ranz, this is the classification of the son guitar family, which includes the leona:

Nomenclature	Acoustic extension	Number of frets	Record range	Tessitura
Guitarra grande	C2 - A3	9	serious	low
Guitarra cuarta	G2 - G4	12	bass - middle	baritone
Requinto jarocho	C3 - C5	12	middle	tenor
Medio requinto	G3 - G5	12	mids - treble	high
Requinto primero	C4 - A5	9	treble	soprano

== Gallery ==
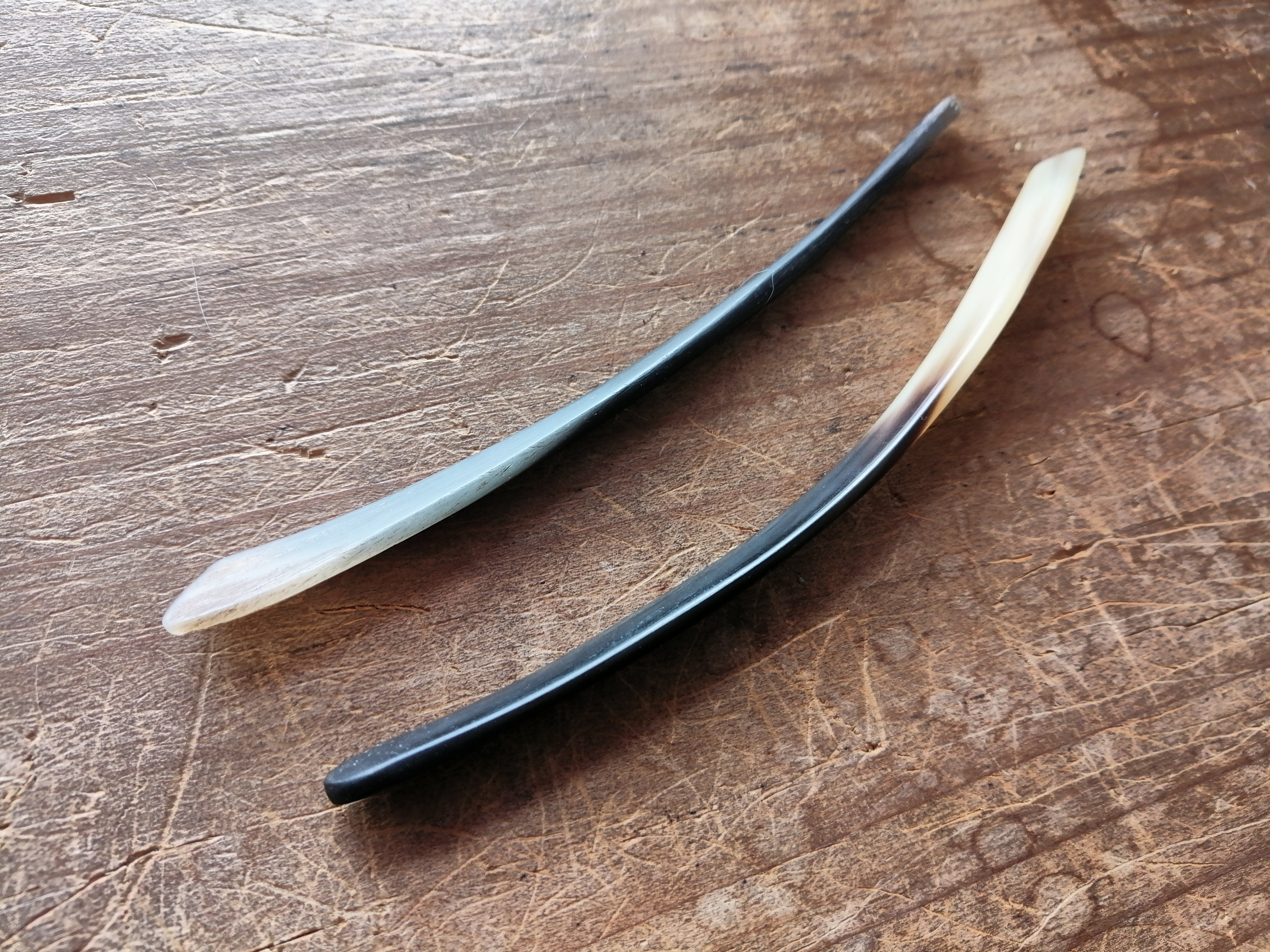
pick to play requinto

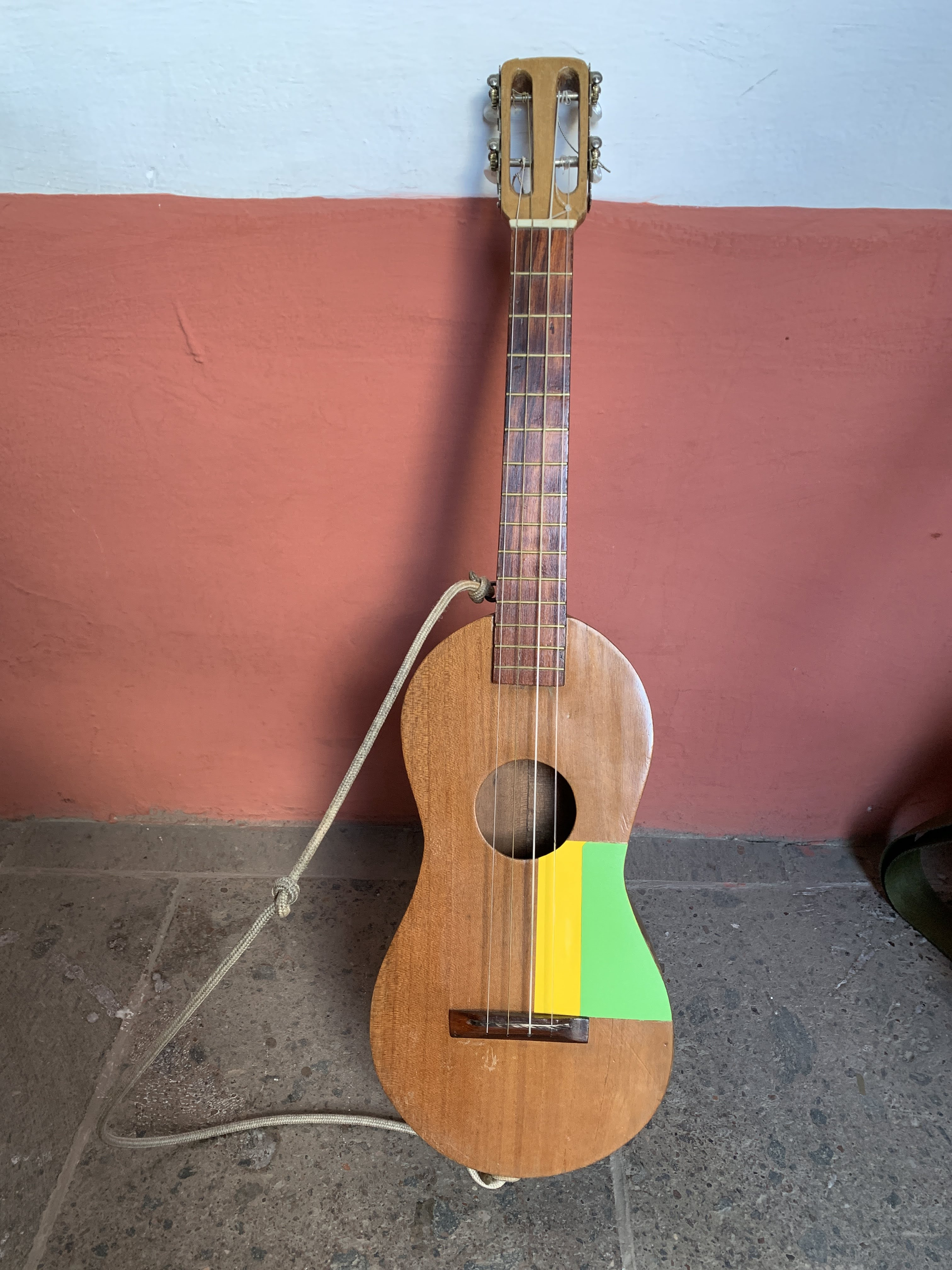
Guitarra de son or Requinto.
