= Jarana jarocha =

Musical instrument from southern Veracruz, Mexico

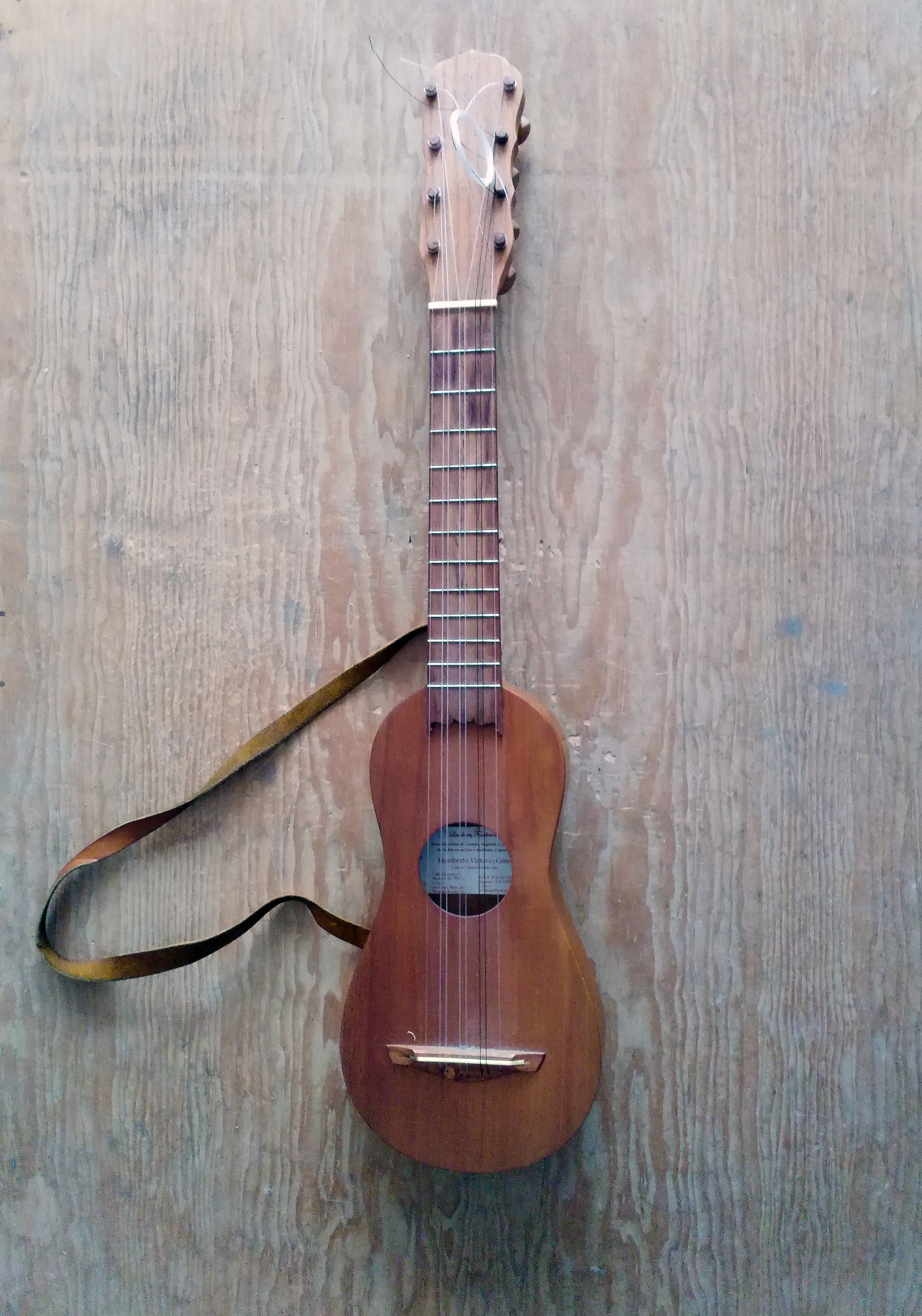
Jarana jarocha.

The jarana jarocha is a guitar-shaped fretted stringed instrument from the southern region of the state of Veracruz, Mexico. Typically strung with 8 strings in 5 courses, usually arranged in two single outer strings with three double-courses in between. The strings are usually nylon, although they were gut in the past. The body is somewhat narrower than a guitar because of its direct lineage from the Spanish baroque guitar of the sixteenth century. It's usually around 50-70 centimeters.Sometimes mistaken for a ukulele, the jarana jarocha comes in at least five sizes, the smallest being the chaquiste, somewhat smaller than a soprano ukulele; then the mosquito, about the size of a soprano ukulele; the 'primera', about the size of a concert ukulele; the 'segunda', in length between a tenor and a baritone ukulele; and the 'tercera', somewhat longer than the baritone ukulele. Some luthiers are building jaranas of a size they label "tercerola" or "jarana cuarta", but there is some discussion as to whether these represent a distinct size or are merely particularly large variations of the standard tercera.

The jarana traditionally features a singular type of construction; the body is carved to shape from a solid piece of wood (traditionally Spanish cedar), and it is then hollowed out, with a separate soundboard and fingerboard applied. Other Mexican and South American folk guitars derivative of Spanish instruments are also made this way, notably the charango of Bolivia.

The sound is distinctive—it does not sound like either a ukulele or a guitar. It is almost a percussion instrument in the way it is played, with an accented down and double upstroke pattern that almost mimics the zapateado steps of the dancers. The sound depends on the wood used and the size of the instrument. Jaranas by different makers tend to have different voices even when made of the same woods because of method of manufacture, etc.

The jarana primera tends to have a high and sharp voice, while the segunda has a more tenor, shimmering voice. The tercera has a deep and sonorous voice, and the tiny chaquiste and mosquito often have shrill voices.

The jarana is used to great effect with other instruments such as the 'arpa jarocha' or Veracruz folk harp, the 'guitarra de son' which is almost identical to the jarana but for the fact that it has four strings that are plucked with a long plectrum usually made of cowhorn (thus making it a melodic rather than rhythm instrument) and because it is used as a lead instrument in vocal music.

Although the jarana usually has eight strings arranged in five courses (a single course, followed by three doubles, then another single), many jaranas are now being produced with 4 double courses, often tuned GG CC EE AA. Leonardo Zendejas of the group Son de Barro has commented that the absence of the bottom G string makes chord shapes and climbing the finger board on these instruments much easier than on more traditional 5-course jaranas. Gilberto Gutierrez Silva, luthier and founder of the group Mono Blanco, has created his own variation—a jarana with three courses of triple-strings, tuned GGG CCC EEE (the same tuning as the Cuban tres). He has named this variation the "tresera".

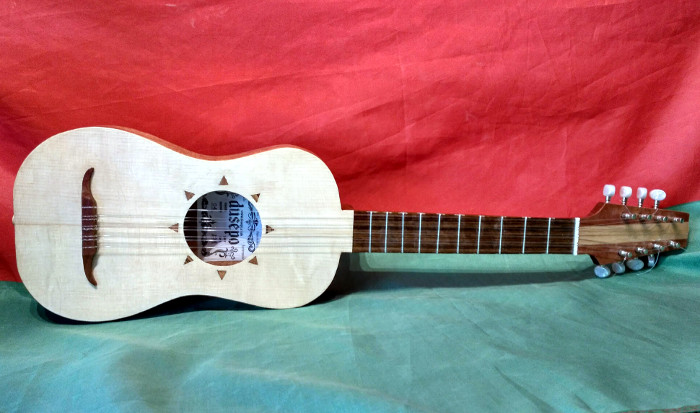
Jarana Jarocha segunda, front view

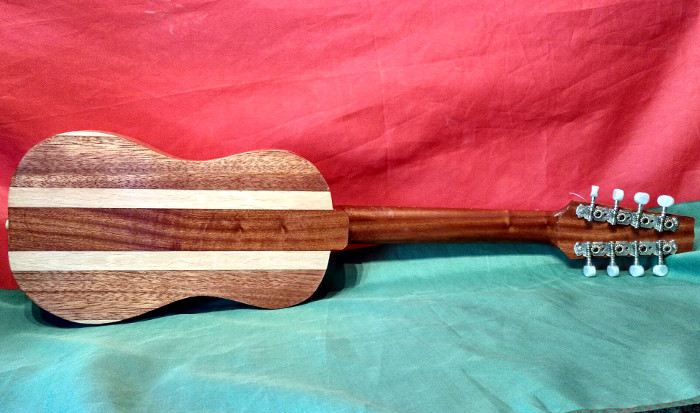
Jarana Jarocha segunda, back view

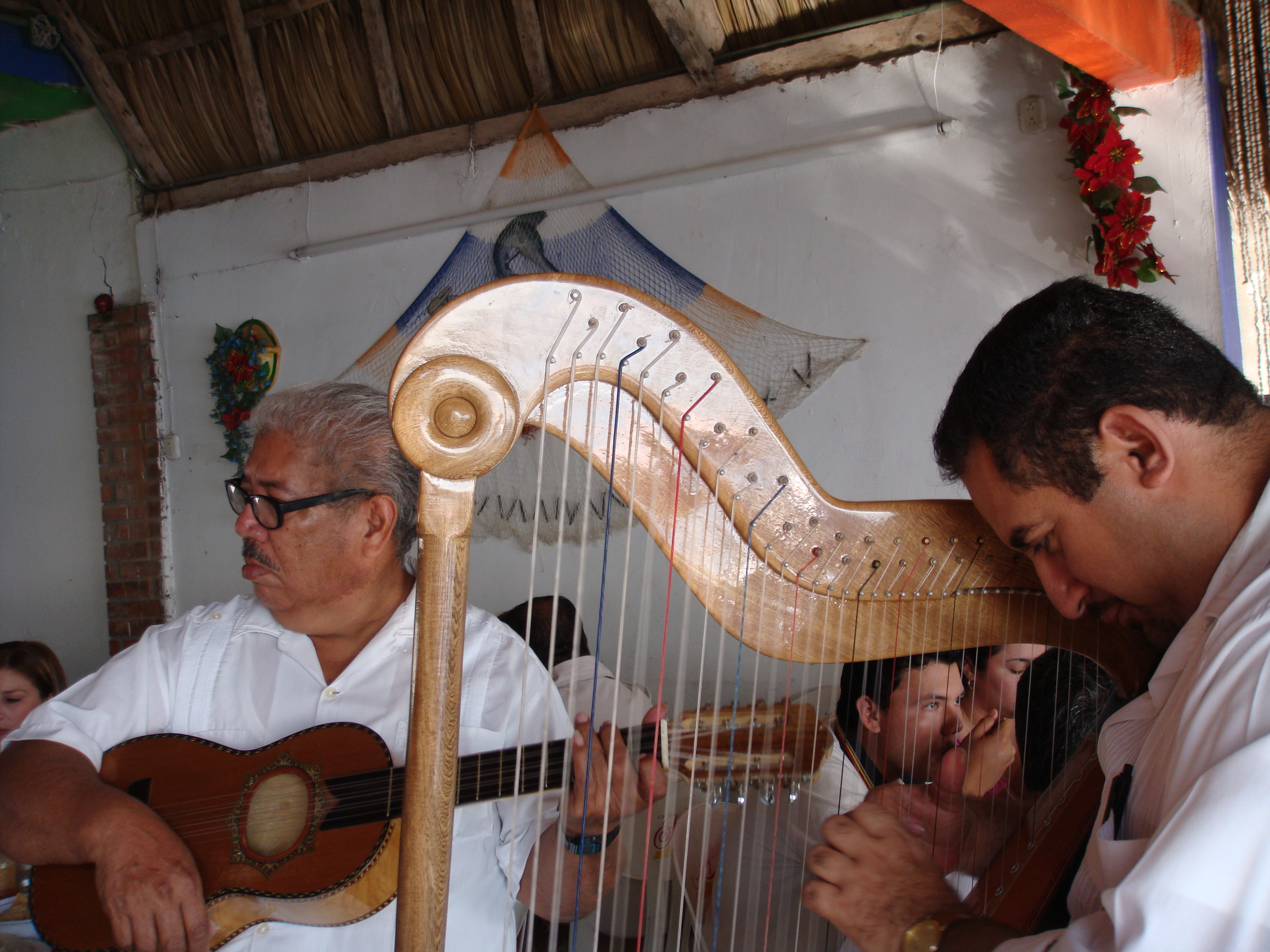
A jarana jarocha and harp being played as part of a son jarocho band in Mexico.

== Sources ==
- David Whitmer, 2005, CD, Traditional Music from Mexico: Son Jarocho de Tlacotalpan (ARCMusic EUCD1966)
