= Earth: Voices of a Planet =

Studio album by Paul Winter
- Released: 1990
- Genre: New age, jazz
- Length: 58:35
- Label: Living Music
- Producer: Russ Landau, Paul Winter

Paul Winter chronology
Earthbeat (1987)	Earth: Voices of a Planet (1990)	Solstice Live! (1993)

Earth: Voices of a Planet is an album released by Paul Winter in 1990. The album was a commissioned for the 20th anniversary of Earth Day, and was premiered in Times Square by the Paul Winter Consort and special guests. The album is a tribute to the Earth, and features at least one instrument or voice from every continent. The album also features animal calls woven into the music. In particular, recordings of elephant basso-rumbles are used. These sounds, created by elephants, are below 20 Hz, and therefore too low for the human ear to detect on its own, and their existence was unknown until shortly before the album was created.

The album was nominated for a Grammy award in 1991.

== Track listing ==
1. "Appalachian Morning" (Halley)
2. "Cathedral Forest" (Halley)
3. "Call Of The Elephant" (Dadey, Berliner, Halley, Winter)
4. "Antarctica" (Halley, Winter)
5. "Ocean Child" (Orca, Halley, Winter)
6. "Uirapuru Do Amazonas" (De Mello, Thiago)
7. "Talkabout" (Friesen, Winter, Landau, Turre)
8. "Russian Girls" (Pokrovsky, Friesen, Halley, Winter, Landau)
9. "Black Forest" (Winter)
10. "Song Of The Exile" (De Mello, Thiago)
11. "Under the Sun" (Velez, Clark, Halley, McCandless, Winter)
12. "And The Earth Spins" (Halley)

== Personnel ==
- Paul Winter – soprano saxophone
- Rhonda Larson – flute
- Paul McCandless – oboe
- Steve Turre – didjeridu
- Paul Halley – keyboards
- Eugene Friesen – cello
- Kenny Mazur – steel-string guitar
- Oscar Castro-Neves – guitar
- Thiago de Mello – voice, guitar, percussion
- Russ Landau – bass
- Paul Wertico – drums
- Kwaku Dadey – Ghanaian drums
- Paul Berliner – percussion
- Guilherme Franco – percussion
- Ted Moore – percussion
- Glen Velez – percussion
- Dmitri Pokrovsky Ensemble
