= Sun Singer (album) =

Studio album by Paul Winter
- Released: 1983
- Genre: New age, jazz
- Length: 35:45
- Label: Living Music
- Producer: Paul Winter

Paul Winter chronology
Missa Gaia/Earth Mass (1982)	Sun Singer (1983)	Canyon (1985)

Sun Singer is an album released by Paul Winter in 1983 for Living Music. The album features the trio of musicians from the Paul Winter Consort: Paul Winter on soprano sax, Paul Halley on piano, pipe organ, and harpsichord, and percussionist Glen Velez. The album also features recordings of bottlenose dolphins, courtesy of Dr. John C. Lilly and the Human Dolphin Foundation.

== Track listing ==
1. "Sun Singer Theme" (Winter)
2. "Hymn To The Sun" (J.S. Bach, Halley, Winter)
3. "Dolphin Morning" (Halley, Winter, Velez)
4. "Reflections In A Summer Pond" (Halley, Winter)
5. "Dancing Particles" (Halley, Winter, Velez)
6. "Winter's Dream" (Halley)
7. "Heaven Within" (Halley)
8. "Big Ben's Bolero" (Halley, Winter, Velez)
9. "Sun Singer" (Halley, Winter)
