= List of chamber jazz musicians =

The following is a list of chamber jazz musicians.

== A ==
- Philip Aaberg - piano
- William Ackerman - guitar
- Sinan Alimanović - piano
- Darol Anger - violin

== B ==
- Pierre Bensusan - guitar
- John Boswell

== C ==
- Jim Chappell
- Billy Childs - piano
- Hans Christian
- Scott Cossu

== D ==
- Eddie Daniels - sax, clarinet
- Alex de Grassi - guitar

== F ==
- Mark Feldman - violin
- Erik Friedlander - cello
- Eugene Friesen - cello

== G ==
- Tord Gustavsen - piano

== H ==
- Paul Halley
- Chico Hamilton - drums

== I ==
- Mark Isham - trumpet

== J ==
- Mike Jones

== L ==
- Adrian Legg - guitar
- Brian Landrus - baritone saxophone, bass clarinet, bass flute
- Jacques Loussier - piano

== M ==
- Michael Manring - bass guitar
- Masada String Trio
- Paul McCandless - oboe, bass clarinet, English horn, and soprano saxophone
- John McLaughlin - guitar
- Montreux
- Joe Mooney - accordion, organ
- Glen Moore - double bass

== N ==
- Nightnoise

== O ==
- Oregon

== P ==
- Paul Winter Consort
- Penguin Cafe Orchestra

== R ==
- Ralph Towner - guitar, piano

== S ==
- Louis Sclavis - sax, clarinet
- Shadowfax
- Robin Spielberg
- Peter Sprague - guitar

== T ==
- Tingstad & Rumbel
- Ralph Towner - twelve-string guitar, classical guitar, piano, synthesizer, percussion, and trumpet
- Trapezoid

== W ==
- Collin Walcott - tabla, sitar
- Russel Walder - oboe
- Eberhard Weber - double-bass
- Paul Winter

== See also ==
- List of jazz musicians
