= Earthbeat (Paul Winter album) =

Studio album by Paul Winter
- Released: October 12, 1987
- Recorded: 1987; Moscow & New York City
- Genre: New-age, folk jazz, ethno-jazz, world fusion
- Length: 37:15
- Label: Living Music
- Producer: Paul Winter, Oscar Castro-Neves, Ted Levin

Paul Winter chronology
Whales Alive (1987)	Earthbeat (1987)	Earth: Voices Of A Planet (1990)

Earthbeat is a landmark album by saxophonist Paul Winter. Recorded and released in 1987, the album was a joint project between the Paul Winter Consort and the Dmitri Pokrovsky Ensemble from Russia, then the Soviet Union.

== Background ==
The Paul Winter Consort first met the Pokrovsky Ensemble during a tour of the Soviet Union in September 1986 when they performed together during a concert at Moscow University. Immediately inspired by their performance, the two groups communicated, through interpreters, the idea of making more music together. After obtaining permission from the Russian music label Melodiya, the Consort began their collaboration with the Ensemble.

The album was recorded in both Moscow and New York City. The two groups combined their musical styles to create an entirely new sound. The result was a melding of Russian circlesongs and folk melodies with Brazilian and African drums and harmonies, along with the western jazz harmonies implemented by the Winter Consort.

== Release and reception ==
The album is considered monumental, as it was the first album of original music created by Americans and Russians together. It received good reviews and was praised by other musicians, notably Pete Seeger and Dave Brubeck. The album was nominated for a Grammy in 1988.

== Uses in other media ==
Russ Landau, a former bassist for the Paul Winter Consort, was asked to write music for the American TV show Survivor. Landau used portions of the first track on this album, "Kurski Funk", to create what became the theme song for the show. Paul Winter then sued the creators of Survivor, accusing them of using his music without his permission. According to Winter, Landau had asked to use music from Earthbeat, and Winter had only granted him permission to use recordings that did not make the final cut, and did not appear on the album.

== Track listing ==
1. "Kurski Funk" (Trad. Kursk, Halley, Castro-Neves, Winter)
2. "The Horse Walked In The Grass" (Trad. Don, Halley, Freisen, Winter)
3. "Kyrie" (Halley)
4. "Steambath" (Trad. Pskov, Halley, Freisen, Winter)
5. "Song For The World" (Trad. Kursk, Halley)
6. "Down In Belgorod" (Trad. Belgorod, Castro-Neves, Freisen, Winter)
7. "The Lake" (Halley)
8. "Epic Song" (Trad. Caucasus, Castro-Neves, Winter)
9. "Green Dreams" (Trad. Belgorod, Halley, Freisen, Winter)
10. "Garden Of The Earth" (Trad. Russia, Halley, Winter)

== Personnel ==
Paul Winter Consort

- Paul Winter- soprano sax
- Eugene Friesen- cello
- Paul Halley- keyboards
- Oscar Castro-Neves- guitar
- Russ Landau- bass
- Ted Moore- percussion
- Glen Velez- percussion
- Neil Clark- percussion

Dimitri Pokrovsky Ensemble

- Dmitri Pokrovsky
- Maria Nefadova
- Alexander Donilov
- Elena Sidorenko
- Sergei Zhirkov
- Tamara Smyslova
- Arthur Partosh
- Anna Knoukhova
- Andrei Kotov
- Nina Savistskaya
- Dimitri Fokin
- Vladimir Teplov
- Irina Ponomaryova
- Sergei Grigoriev
