= Wintersong (Paul Winter album) =

Studio album by Paul Winter
- Released: 1986
- Genre: New age, jazz
- Length: 35:41
- Label: Living Music
- Producer: Eugene Friesen, Paul Winter

Paul Winter chronology
| Canyon (1985) | Wintersong (1986) | Whales Alive (1987) |

Wintersong is an album released in 1986 by Paul Winter, featuring the Paul Winter Consort. The album is a collection of lesser known folk melodies from North America and Europe, arranged in a mixed style of jazz and classical, and played with Brazilian rhythms.

== Track listing ==
1. "Tomorrow Is My Dancing Day" (Trad. English)
2. "Swedish Song" (Gustaf Nordqvist)
3. "The Cherry Tree" (Trad. Appalachian)
4. "Little One" (Trad. Appalachian)
5. "Peasant Revels" (Trad. German and English)
6. "Dance Of The Golden Bough" (Trad. Italian)
7. "Beautiful Star" (Odetta)
8. "Wintersong" (Trad. French)
9. "Joy" (J.S.Bach)

== Personnel ==
- Paul Winter – soprano saxophone
- Nancy Rumbel – English horn, oboe
- Rhonda Larson – flute
- Paul Halley – piano, organ, harpsichord
- Dan Carillo – steel-string guitar
- Oscar Castro-Neves – classical guitar
- Eugene Friesen – cello
- Russ Landau – bass
- Guilherme Franco – snare drum
- Marcio Supal – cuica, whistle
- Neil Clark – donno, bells, percussion
- Ted Moore – orchestra bells, surdo, percussion
