= Prayer for the Wild Things =

Studio album by Paul Winter
- Released: 1994
- Genre: New age
- Length: 68:10
- Label: Living Music
- Producer: Paul Winter

Paul Winter chronology
Solstice Live! (1993)	Prayer for the Wild Things (1994)	Canyon Lullaby (1997)

Prayer for the Wild Things is an album released by Paul Winter in 1994. The album was commissioned to accompany a painting by artist Bev Doolittle, which is also titled Prayer For The Wild Things. A portion of this painting is seen on the album cover.

Paul Winter created the album to depict in the listener's mind a journey through a day and night in the Northern Rockies, and based it on "a series of vignettes about the animals, with the saxophone recurring throughout as a kind of interlocutor". After choosing which animals to represent on the album, Winter chose instruments to accompany each animal that he felt represented that animal in some way. To demonstrate how all of these animals are interconnected in life, the melodies played on these instruments were written so that they could all be interwoven.

Paul traveled around the area of the Northern Rockies during the creation of this album, during which he went to a number of National Parks and played improvised duets with many of the animals in the parks. These duets were recorded, and many of them were put on the album as well.

The album won the Grammy for best new age album in 1995.

== Track listing ==
1. "Eagle Mountain" (Winter)
2. "Round Dance" (Neskahi)
3. "On the River" (Winter)
4. "Buffalo Prairie" (Winter)
5. "Osprey" (Winter)
6. "Grizzly Bear Cubs with Their Mom After Breakfast" (Friesen, Haddad, Winter)
7. "Tritones in the Canyon" (Winter)
8. "Moose Walk" (Velez, Winter)
9. "Gates of the Mountain" (Winter)
10. "Cougar Bassoon" (Urbinato)
11. "Antelope Dreams of Her African Cousins" (Winter)
12. "Afternoon's End" (Velez, Winter)
13. "Sunset on Eagle Mountain" (Winter)
14. "White Goat of the Rockies" (Friesen, Winter)
15. "Loon on Mud Pond" (Winter)
16. "Night Voices"
17. "Elk Horns" (Clark, Winter)
18. "North Fork Wolves in the Midnight Rain" (Winter)
19. "Night into Dawn" (Winter)
20. "Dance of All Beings" (Neskahi)
21. "Eagle Mountain" (Winter)

== Personnel ==
- Paul Winter – soprano saxophone
- John Clark – French horn
- Randy Wolfgang – English horn
- Mark Perchanok – heckelphone
- John Urbinato – bassoon
- Dennis Smylie – contrabass clarinet
- Paul Halley – pipe organ
- Eugene Friesen – cello
- Gordon Gottlieb – percussion
- Jamey Haddad – percussion
- Glen Velez – percussion
- Arlie Neskahi and the White Eagle Singers

== Animals of the Rocky Mountains ==
The calls of birds and mammals from the Rocky Mountains were used as part of the album. Animals included in the album are:

- Elk
- Bison
- Grizzly bear
- Loon
- Mountain lion
- Bald eagle
- Osprey
- Antelope
- Canada goose
- Wolf
- Raven
- American bittern
- White-tailed deer
- Coyote
- Boreal owl
- Golden eagle
- Sandhill crane
- Hermit thrush
- Trumpeter swan
- Whooping crane
- Uphill sandpiper
- Ruffled grouse
- Greater prairie chicken
- Willow ptarmigan
- Belted kingfisher
- Swainson's thrush
- Western meadowlark

The recordings of animal calls along with saxophone solos were recorded at Gates of the Mountains, Glacier National Park, and Yellowstone National Park.
