= Canyon (Paul Winter album) =

Studio album by Paul Winter
- Released: 1985
- Genre: New age, jazz
- Length: 40:51
- Label: Living Music
- Producer: Paul Winter, Sam West

Paul Winter chronology
Sun Singer (1983)	Canyon (1985)	Wintersong (1986)

Canyon is an album released in 1985 by Paul Winter, featuring his Paul Winter Consort. It was recorded in a small side canyon located in the Grand Canyon, which the members of the Consort nicknamed Bach's canyon, due to its 7-second reverberation, which made a perfect place to record music. The original idea of playing music in the canyon began when Winter played his saxophone while standing on the edge of the canyon, and felt that the long echoes coming back from the canyon almost seemed like the Earth was responding back to him.

Paul Winter and the members of his band rafted down the river searching for an ideal location to record, settling on Bach's canyon. Paul Winter has since gone back and recorded in the canyon for other albums.

Canyon was nominated for a Grammy in 1986.

== Track listing ==
1. "Grand Canyon Sunrise"
2. "Morning Echoes"
3. "Bright Angel"
4. "Raven Dance"
5. "Bedrock Cathedral"
6. "River Run"
7. "Elves Chasm"
8. "Sockdolager"
9. "Air"
10. "Grand Canyon Sunset"

== Personnel ==
- Paul Winter – soprano saxophone
- John Clark – French horn
- Paul McCandless – oboe
- Paul Halley – keyboards
- Oscar Castro-Neves – guitar
- David Darling – cello
- Eugene Friesen – cello
- Glen Velez – percussion
- Nancy Rumbel – rattle
