= Miho: Journey to the Mountain =

Studio album by Paul Winter Consort
- Released: 2010
- Recorded: 2010
- Genres: New age, world fusion
- Label: Living Music

Paul Winter Consort chronology
Crestone (2007)	Miho: Journey to the Mountain (2010)

Miho: Journey to the Mountain is an album by Paul Winter Consort, released in 2010 through the record label Living Music. The album was commissioned by the Miho Museum in Shiga, Japan to be a musical celebration of the museum. The museum is a unique piece of architecture, built on the top of a mountain, and partially tunneling into it, giving the experience of the museum being part of the Earth. The album was recorded in the corridors of the museum, which are naturally reverberant. In 2011, the album earned the group a Grammy Award for Best New Age Album. This collaboration includes contributions by award winning koto musician Yukiko Matsuyama, https://www.yukikomatsuyama.com/about-yukiko

== Track listing ==
1. "Saxophone (Song of Miho)"
2. "Sarangi (Dawn Raga)"
3. "Arto (Before It's Too Late)"
4. "English Horn (Theme from "On the Central Steppes of Asia", Borodin)"
5. "Koto"
6. "Frame Drums (Cedar Grove Dance)"
7. "Bansuri & Saxophone"
8. "Yangjin (Words of Wish Fulfillment)"
9. "Bendir and Heckelphone"
10. "Saxophone Reprise"
11. "Arto (Singing to the Mountain)"
12. "The Welcome (Song of Miho)"
13. "Koto Spring"
14. "Elephant Dance"
15. "Whale Raga"
16. "Love Is Not in Your Mind"
17. "Twilight"
18. "Andante (Bach)"
19. "Remembering"
20. "Saturday Night in Peach Blossom Valley"
21. "Song of Miho"
22. "Morning Sun"

== Personnel ==
- Paul Winter – soprano saxophone
- Paul McCandless – oboe, English horn, heckelphone, bass clarinet
- Don Grusin – keyboards
- Jordan Rudess – keyboards
- Tim Brumfield – piano, organ
- Eugene Friesen – cello
- Glen Velez – percussion, bendir, riq, tar, shaker
- Café – percussion
- Arto Tuncboyaciyan – vocals, percussion, sazabo
- Dhruba Ghosh – sarangi
- Steve Gorn –bansuri
- Yukiko Matsuyama – koto
- Eriko Koide – carillon
- Yangjin Lamu – voice
- Shumei Taiko Ensemble
- Shumei Chorus conducted by Hiroko Matsui
- Worcester Polytechnic Institute Chorus conducted by Wayne Abercrombie
