= Crestone (album) =

Studio album by Paul Winter Consort
- Released: September 25, 2007
- Recorded: 2007
- Genre: New-age
- Label: Living Music
- Producer: Paul Winter, Peter May

Paul Winter Consort chronology
Silver Solstice (2005)	Crestone (2007)	Miho: Journey to the Mountain (2010)

Crestone is an album by Paul Winter Consort, released in 2007 through the record label Living Music. The album is named after the community of Crestone, Colorado. The album was recorded in the Sangre de Cristo Mountains, the Great Sand Dunes, and the San Luis Valley of southern Colorado, all of which are located near Crestone. In 2008, the album earned the group a Grammy Award for Best New Age Album.

== Track listing ==
1. "Songs to the Mountains"
2. "Koji Island"
3. "Blue Horse Special"
4. "Calling the Buffalo"
5. "Zen Morning"
6. "Witchi Tai To (Invocation)"
7. "Whooper Dance"
8. "Intertribal Pow-Wow Song"
9. "Mountain Treefrogs"
10. "Cloud"
11. "The Smell of the Rain"
12. "Meadowlark"
13. "Sunset on the Great Sand Dunes"
14. "Nightfall in the Wetlands"
15. "Moonrise Over the Sangres"
16. "All My Relations"
17. "Bumblebee Honor Song"
18. "Home on the Range"
19. "Witchi Tai to"
20. "Goodnight to the Mountains"

== Personnel ==
- Paul Winter – soprano saxophone
- Paul McCandless – oboe, bass clarinet
- Don Grusin – keyboard
- Eugene Friesen – cello
- Glen Velez – percussion
- John-Carlos Perea – voice, drum, cedar flute
- Koji Nakamura – taiko drum
- Peter May – conch shells
- Richard Cooke – voice
