= Canyon Lullaby =

Studio album by Paul Winter
- Released: 1997
- Genre: New age
- Length: 60:20
- Label: Living Music
- Producer: Paul Winter, Sam West, Les Kahn

Paul Winter chronology
Prayer for the Wild Things (1994)	Canyon Lullaby (1997)	Brazilian Days (1998)

Professional ratings
Review scores
Source	Rating
AllMusic	3/5 stars

Canyon Lullaby is an album by the American saxophonist Paul Winter, released in 1997. It is the first Paul Winter album made up entirely of solo saxophone improvisations. It is also the first surround sound album to be recorded in the wilderness. The album was nominated for a Grammy Award, in the "Best New Age Album" category.

== Background ==
In 1985, Paul Winter recorded Canyon in a naturally reverberant side canyon of the Grand Canyon that he nicknamed "Bach's Canyon". The album featured the Paul Winter Consort. In 1996, he returned to the canyon to create an album of solo saxophone improvisations. The album was a musical representation of a period of 24 hours in the canyon. To help create this feeling, Winter played at different times during the day and night.

== Critical reception ==
AllMusic wrote: "Interesting and exhilarating in small doses, Canyon Lullaby can go beyond soothing to soporific if listened to in one sitting."

== Track listing ==
1. "Canyon Lullaby"
2. "First Light"
3. "Honoring Song"
4. "Canyon Chaconne"
5. "Dream of the Basketmaker"
6. "Air for Keetu"
7. "Cornmeal Medicine Wheel"
8. "Redbud Siesta"
9. "Lizard Lounge"
10. "Hummingbird's Ballad"
11. "Afternoon Sun"
12. "Waltz of the Ravens"
13. "Lullaby at Pumpkin Springs"
14. "Dreamcatcher"
15. "Mars on the Rim"
16. "Midnight Blue"
17. "Moon Shadows"
18. "Music Temple"
19. "Rain Blessing"
20. "Sweet Dreams, Little One"
21. "Canyon Chaconne (Reprise)"
