= Missa Gaia/Earth Mass =

Studio album by Paul Winter
- Released: 1982
- Genre: New age; jazz; liturgical
- Length: 63:58
- Label: Living Music
- Producer: Paul Winter, Oscar Castro-Neves

Paul Winter chronology
| Callings (1980) | Missa Gaia/Earth Mass (1982) | Sun Singer (1983) |

Missa Gaia/Earth Mass is an album released by Paul Winter in 1982 for Living Music. He co-wrote the mass with Paul Halley, Jim Scott, Oscar Castro-Neves, and Kim Oler. The title stems from two languages, Latin (missa = mass) and Greek (gaia = mother nature). The Earth Mass was one of the first contributions made by Paul Winter when he and his Paul Winter Consort became the artists in residence at the Cathedral of St. John the Divine in New York City. The mass includes the usual text, such as the Kyrie and the Agnus Dei, and also other text, hymns, and instrumental pieces. The mass is an environmental liturgy of contemporary music. It features the instrumentation of the Paul Winter Consort along with a choir, vocal soloists, and the calls of wolves, whales, and many other animals that are woven into the pieces, sometimes used as the melody: The "Kyrie" is derived from the call of a wolf, the "Sanctus" from the songs of humpback whales. Man literally learns how to sing from animals. Missa Gaia is a mass that is equally ecumenical as it is ecological. It involves all voices of the earth. Musically the ecumenical character is underlined by a web of various musical traditions and styles: from Gregorian chant of the Middle Ages through Protestant hymns, Romantic organ music, African instruments, Latin American rhythms, elements of Gospel song to contemporary rock ballad. The name "Missa Gaia" refers to the "Gaia hypothesis" of scientists James Lovelock and Lynn Margulis which states "that the entire range of living matter on Earth, from whales to viruses, and from oaks to algae, could be regarded as constituting a single living entity, capable of manipulating the Earths's atmosphere to suit its overall needs and endowed with faculties and power far beyond its constituent parts". Since it was first written, the mass is performed annually at the Cathedral of St. John the Divine at The Feast of St. Francis which is the blessing of the animals. The first complete performance in Europe was presented by the GospelChor Saarbrücken (Germany) in 1995 under the direction of Wilhelm Otto Deutsch.

== Track listing ==
1. "Canticle of Brother Sun"
2. "Kyrie"
3. "Beatitudes"
4. "Mystery"
5. "Return To Gaia"
6. "For The Beauty Of The Earth"
7. "Adoro Te Devote"
8. "For The Beauty Of The Earth"
9. "Sanctus and Benedictus"
10. "Stained-Glass Morning"
11. "Sun Psalm"
12. "Song Of Praise" *
13. "Dance Of Gaia" *
14. "The Promise Of A Fisherman"
15. "The Blue Green Hills Of Earth"
16. "Agnus Dei"
17. "Let Us Go Forth In Peace"

* Only in vinyl version

== Personnel ==
- Paul Winter – soprano saxophone
- Nancy Rumbel – oboe and English horn
- Paul Halley – organ and piano
- Phil Markowitz – piano on Beatitudes
- Jim Scott – classical and 12–string guitar
- Eugene Friesen – cello
- Gordon Johnson – bass
- Guilherme Franco – percussion
- Ted Moore – percussion
- Jim Saporito – percussion
- Susan Osborn – voice
- Cathedral Chorus and Singers, conducted by Gil Robbins and Paul Halley
- The Strath Haven High School Cantata, directed by John Shankweiler

Music: Paul Winter, Missa Gaia Earth Mass. A Mass in Celebration of Mother Earth, Hal·Leonard, Milwaukee 2006 (ISBN 0-634-09871-3)
