= Dorothy Papadakos =

American concert organist, composer, lyricist, playwright and author

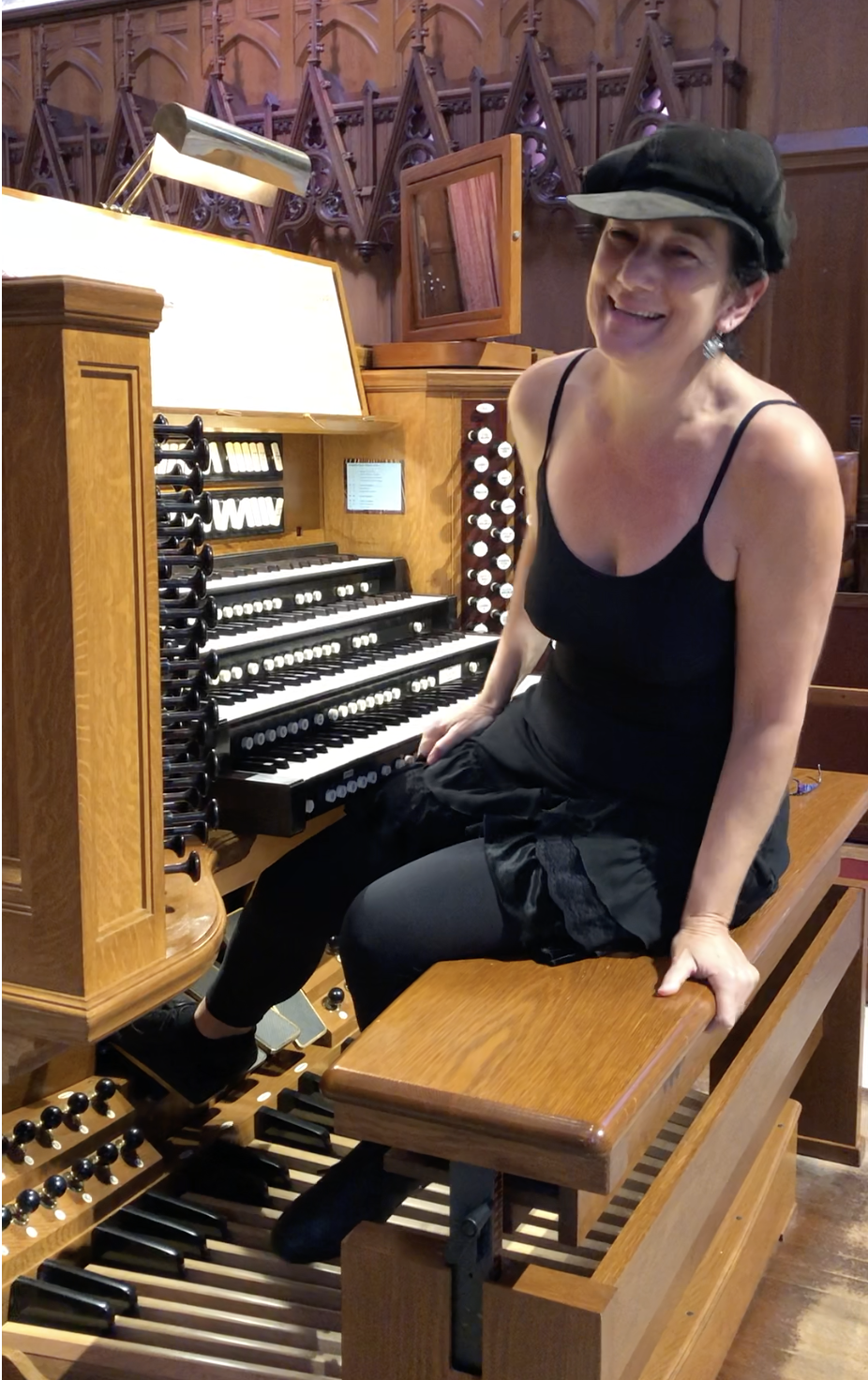
- Born: 1960 (age 65–66)
- Education: Barnard College; Juilliard School
- Occupations: Organist; Playwright; Composer; Author
- Years active: 1980–present
- Known for: Organist, Cathedral of St. John the Divine and silent film accompanist; Paul Winter Consort; Author, Kingdom of Winter
- Spouse: Tracy McCullen (after 2000)
- Parent(s): Dorothy M. Johnson and Peter J. Papadakos
- Website: www.dorothypapadakos.com

Dorothy Jean Papadakos (born 1960) is an American concert organist, composer, lyricist, playwright, and author. She is the former organist at the Cathedral of St. John the Divine in New York City (1990–2003), the first female organist to hold that post. She was also organist for the Paul Winter Consort at the cathedral's Easter and Christmas services and performed with the ensemble on their Grammy Award-winning album Silver Solstice, released in 2005.

In 2005, Papadakos co-produced Pompeii the Musical, for which she wrote the book, music and lyrics. Its production was well-received, breaking box office records when it premiered in Wilmington, North Carolina.

In 2017, her first novel, The Kingdom of Winter, was published. Using fantasy characters to address climate change concerns, the book is now used in a science and literature curriculum for middle-school students.

== Early years ==
Papadakos was born in 1960, the daughter of actress Dorothy M. Johnson and Greek-American aeronautical designer Peter J. Papadakos. As a child, she began studying piano while living with her family in Reno, Nevada, and soon became interested in jazz and improvisation. She attended Reno High School. After graduating from Barnard College in 1982, Papadakos earned a master's degree in Organ Performance at the Juilliard School in 1988. In 1984, she began studying improvisation with Paul Halley and, in 1987, became Halley's assistant organist at the Cathedral of St. John the Divine.

== Career ==
=== Cathedral organist (1990–2003) ===
In 1990, Paul Halley resigned as organist of New York City's Cathedral of St. John the Divine to pursue his solo career. Papadakos, who had been Halley's assistant, succeeded him as Cathedral Organist, becoming the first woman to be appointed organist at the largest Gothic-style cathedral in the world.

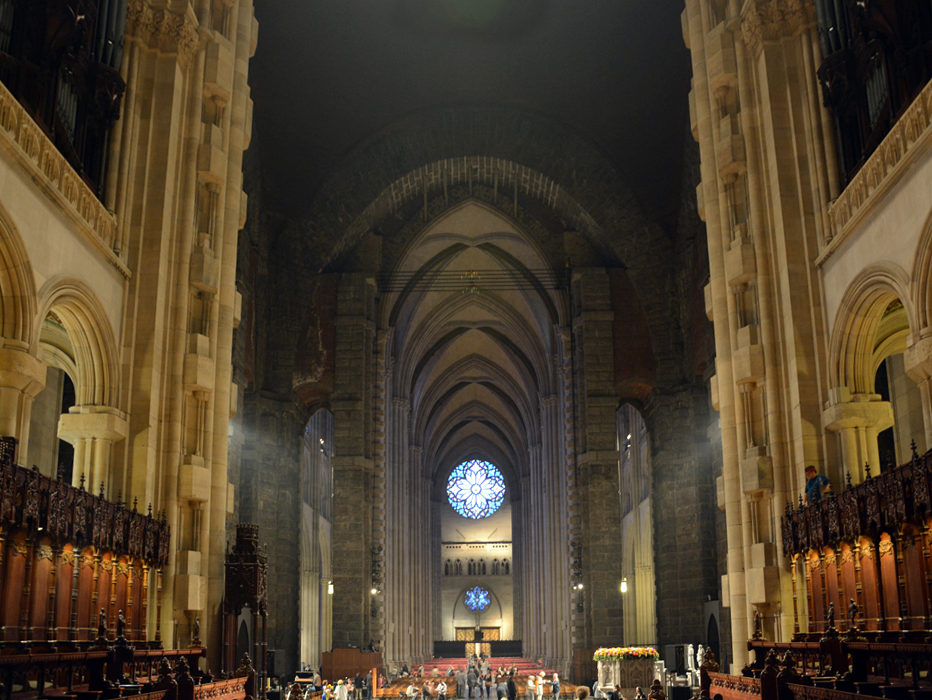
The vast expanse of the Cathedral of St. John the Divine – organ pipes visible above both sides of Choir

As organist at the Episcopalian edifice, Papadakos eschewed a staid, conservative style of music-making in favor of a creative, improvisational approach. Her playing, said The New York Times, imparts "jazz, African rhythms and real heart to centuries-old hymns". She also had to cope with the acoustic challenges of playing in such an immense space, with an eight-second reverberation time, as she demonstrated to a Smithsonian magazine reporter in 1997. When she returned to Reno, Nevada, for a performance in 1995, a Reno Gazette-Journal critic called her a "sensational organist" and "among the toasts of Manhattan".

Papadakos also accompanied the Paul Winter Consort at the cathedral's Easter and Christmas services. She later performed with the ensemble on three of their recordings, including the Grammy Award-winning album Silver Solstice, released in 2005.

In the wake of the September 11, 2001, terrorist attack in Manhattan, Papadakos performed in "An Evening of Peace" gathering at nearby Riverside Church, joining other activists including Vietnamese Buddhist monk Thích Nhất Hạnh, Judy Collins, and Paul Winter. The concert's theme was criticized afterwards by Kay S. Hymowitz and Harry Stein, writing in The Wall Street Journal. The columnists decried what they called "multiculturalism, the enemy within," saying it was at variance with the majority of American opinion favoring a sustained military response.

On the morning of December 18, 2001, a five-alarm fire began in the cathedral's gift shop, located in the north transept. Although the Great Organ's oak casework and its thousands of pipes were not consumed by the conflagration, the organ console and pipes were blanketed in ash and soot, rendering the instrument unplayable. Undaunted, Papadakos carried on as organist for the throngs attending the church's popular Christmas services, playing a digital 3-manual organ, provided by the Allen Organ Company, so Cathedral Christmas services could proceed. She continued as Cathedral organist until 2003.

=== Playwright ===
After visiting the ruins of Pompeii in Italy, Papadakos began writing a stage play about life in the ancient Roman city that ended in 79 AD with the cataclysmic eruption of Mt. Vesuvius. The resulting Pompeii: The Musical premiered in November 2005, in Wilmington, North Carolina. After opening night at the Thalian Center for the Performing Arts, successor to historic Thalian Hall, the performances were sold out for its two-week run, breaking 150-year-old box office records as more than six thousand attended, forcing the theatre to open its rarely used third tier for overflow seating. Pompeii, later re-titled BACCHUS, also won Encore Magazine's "Best Theatre Production of 2006" Award.

=== Silent film accompanist ===
Papadakos makes frequent appearances providing improvised organ music to accompany silent film screenings, a genre she began to play at the Cathedral when asked to fill in as a last-minute substitute for theater organist Lee Erwin. In the early 2000s, Papadakos started her annual Halloween Horror Tour, which brings silent film's classics, such as Dr. Jekyll and Mr. Hyde and Phantom of the Opera to life on the world's pipe organs. Her silent film appearances have included such classics as a rendition of the Hunchback of Notre Dame at a New Year's Eve 2011 celebration at Grace Cathedral, San Francisco, and Nosferatu at Kansas City's Kauffman Center for the Performing Arts organ in 2014.

Explaining her fondness for silent movie accompaniment, Papadakos told an interviewer:

When accompanying a silent film, you're having to generate fresh new musical ideas non-stop to keep it interesting for the audience on the journey of the story. Because it's such a test of endurance, improvisational ability, and quick adaptation to any kind of organ.

=== Author ===
Papadakos published a novel about climate change and its effect on Earth's seasons, entitled The Kingdom of Winter, in 2017. Using fictional characters, such as the wicked "Fire Witch", to portray global warming, the book seeks to present these issues in an understandable fantasy appealing to a broad audience. Well received by the climate science community and STEM teachers, it was turned into a Science and Literature curriculum for middle school students, The Kingdom of Winter, A Curriculum Guide by science educator Joshua Hunter and was endorsed by the International Honor Society in Education.

== Personal life ==
Papadakos is married to landscape designer Tracy McCullen. The New York Times reported that their wedding, held at the Cathedral on May 20, 2000, had Renaissance musicians and costumed ushers. In 2003, Papadakos left New York and the cathedral for the couple's home near Wrightsville Beach, North Carolina.

== Discography ==
Papadakos has recorded several CDs of solo works for organ as well as various ensembles. Her recordings include:

- Solstice Live! (1993), with Paul Winter Consort at the Cathedral
- Gubaidulina: In Croce for Violoncello and Organ (1995)
- Great Organs of New York (1996; OCLC 41187391)
- Dorothy Over the Rainbow (1996), organ improvisations
- I Do! Me, Too! (1997), interfaith wedding music
- Shades of Green (1999), organ improvisations with guest artists
- Christmas Traveler (1999), international holiday music with guest artists
- Journey with the Sun (2000), with Paul Winter Consort
- Café St. John – Organ Improvisations (2001)
- Silver Solstice (2005), with Paul Winter Consort
