= Dmitri Pokrovsky Ensemble =

Russian singing ensemble (founded 1973)

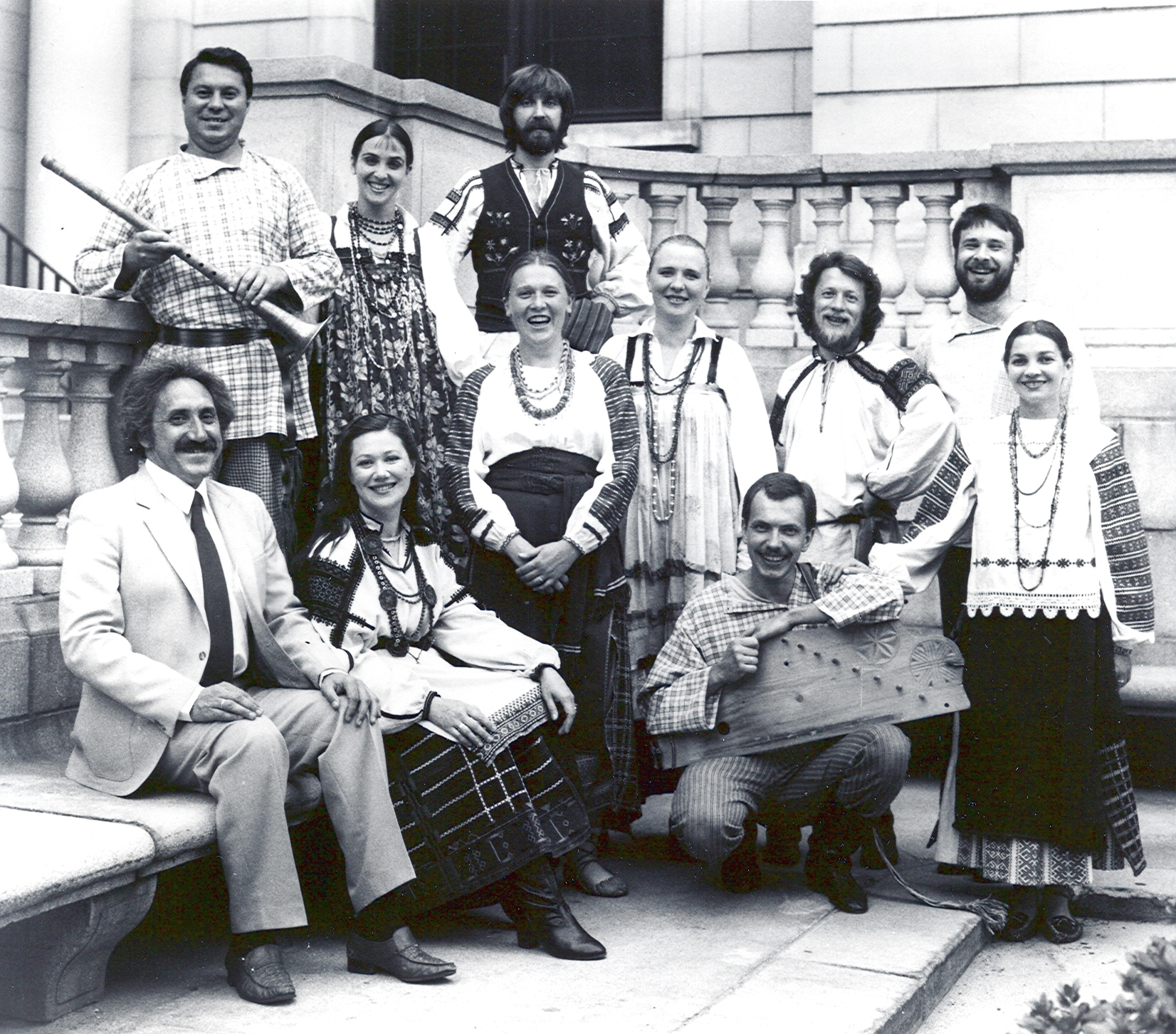
Dmitri Pokrovsky and His Ensemble. Boston US, 1988

The Dmitri Pokrovsky Ensemble (Russian: Ансамбль Дмитрия Покровского, romanized: Ansambl Dmitriya Pokrovskogo) was founded by Dmitri Pokrovsky (1944–1996) together with his wife and lifelong partner, Tamara Smyslova, in Moscow in 1973 as an experimental singing group under folk Commission of the URSS Сomposers Union.The appearance of this team completely changed in modern society the understanding and view of folklore. For the first time in this Ensemble came together scientific approach to the study of folklore and brilliant stage presentation of it. Professional musicians belonging to the city culture had to master a large number very dissimilar styles of Russian village music. The Pokrovsky Ensemble became the first professional group which began to study the Russian folk music from authentic village musicians in numerous folklore expeditions. Participants in the Pokrovsky Ensemble recorded, learned and then performed in very different traditions, styles and manners of folk singing, playing and dancing, trying to penetrate to the rules of its existence, understand the laws of its development. Dmitri Pokrovsky was one of the first musicians who tried to bridge the gap between old and new music. The credo of The Pokrovsky Ensemble is that Russian traditional folk music is a living treasure of Russian culture and is the basis for all classical and contemporary Russian music. The Pokrovsky Ensemble became the starting point in the search for new ways to stage implementation of folk music and marked the beginning of a Russian wave in world music.

The Ensemble participated in a Paul Winter Consort tour, promoting their joint album, Earthbeat, and many varied international festivals (including the Tokyo Summer Festival, Berliner Festwochen, etc.). The Ensemble has worked with numerous famous musicians and composers (Michael Tilson Thomas, Thomas Ades, Vladimir Martynov, Iraida Yusupova, Anton Batagov, Alexey Aygi, Vladimir Nikolaev, Alexey Shelygin, Tatiana Grindenko, Labèque sisters, Felix Korobov, Vladimir Dashkevich, Teodor Currentzis, Ludovic Morlot, M. Shmotova, Daniel Kawka etc.) It has performed at the American White House, Tanglewood, Carnegie Hall, Sydney Opera, Vienna, Tokyo, Los-Angeles, San Francisco and Berlin Philharmonic Halls, at Benaroya Hall Seattle etc. Innovative interpretation of Stravinsky's masterpiece "Les Noces "in 1994 brought Ensemble undeniable success and international recognition. The Pokrovsky Ensemble has toured throughout the former USSR and Russia, the United States, Germany, Austria, England, Switzerland, Canada, Australia, Netherlands, Israel, Finland, Japan, Italy, Belgium etc. Ensemble recordings include "Faces of Russia" (Trikont label, US)"Wild Field", a survey of Russian folk music released by Peter Gabriel's Real World label, "Earthbeat", an artistic collaboration with the Paul Winter Consort (Living Music, US ), Igor Stravinsky's "Les Noces"(Electra-Nonesuch, US), "Night in Galicia" (V.Martynov) ( CCn'C Records, Germany), "Mother Russia" (Fivepro.Rec, Russia), "Voices of Frozen Land" of Alexander Raskatov (NBELIVE, Netherlands) etc.

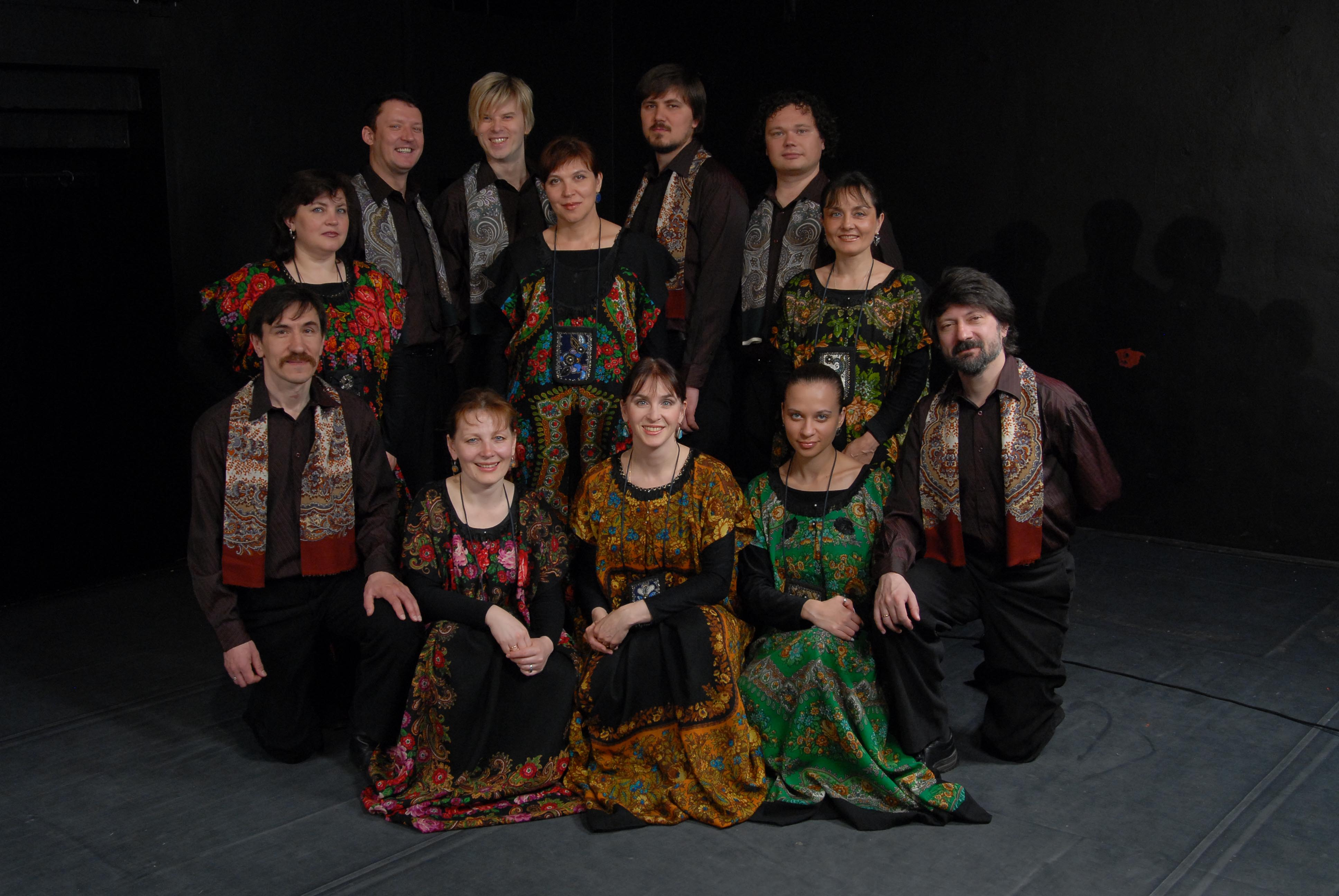
Dmitri Pokrovsky Ensemble, 2009, Moscow

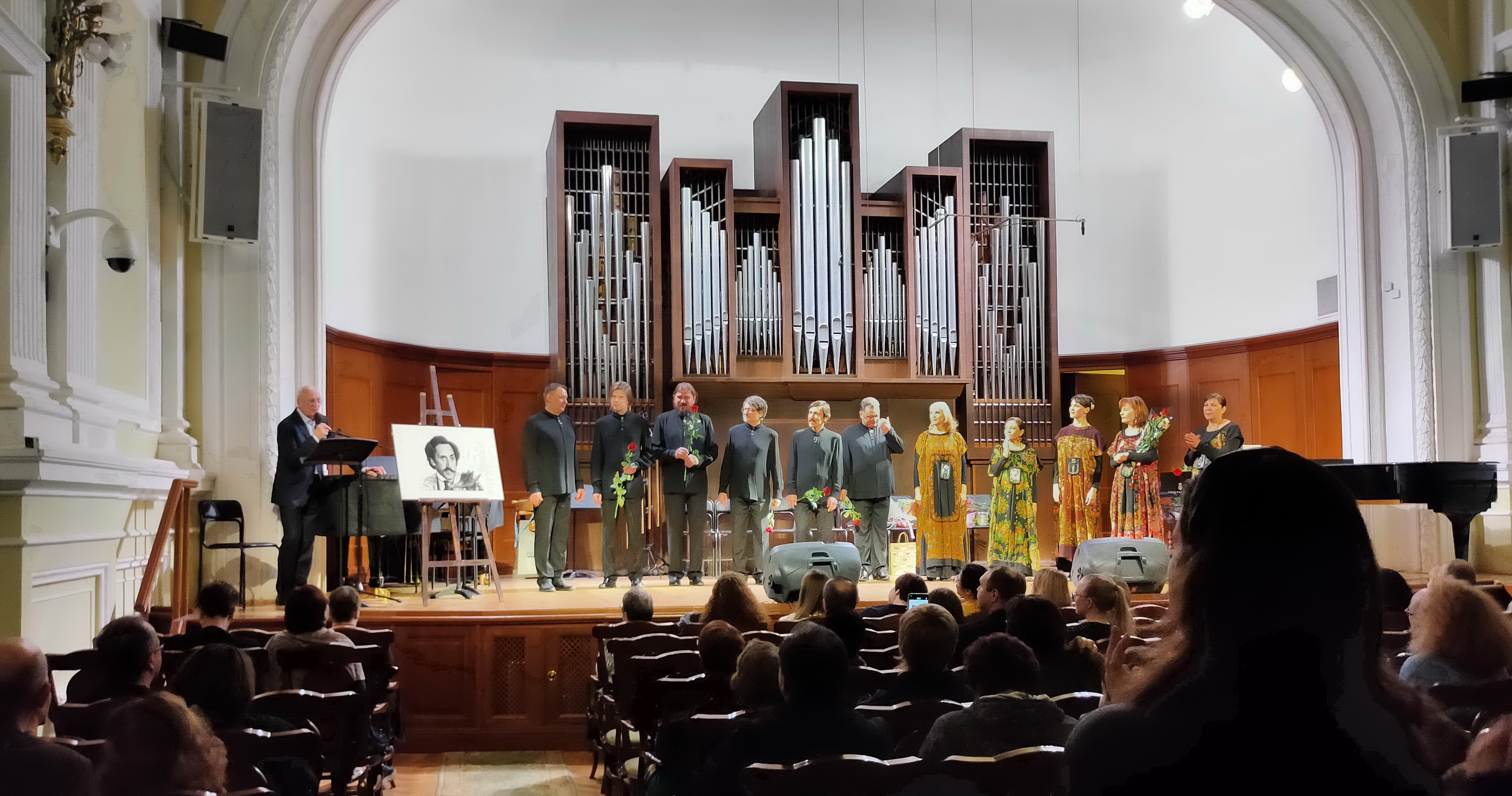
Dmitry Pokrovsky Ensemble 50th anniversary performance "From Folklore to Avant-garde" 15.02.2023 at the Moscow Conservatory

Since Dmitri Pokrovsky's death in 1996 the ensemble has changed its face dramatically. Maria Nefedova and Olga Yukecheva are now its music director and stage director respectively. The Ensemble goes on tours, performs new programs of folk, sacred and modern music include "Faces of Russia", "The Man Lives Like The Grass Grows" – Russian spiritual music, "Russian Wedding", "Russian Christmas", "From Romance to Limerick", "Russian Length Song", "Vivat, Russia!" – songs and music of Peter The Great time, "Russian Folk Theatre", program "Romancein Letters" in honor of the Victory in Patriotic War of 1812 (Russian: "Романс в письмах", Moscow International House of Music, 2013), Russian Tales (Russian: "Парасказки", Moscow International House of Music, 2013), The Tale of Igor's Campaign (Russian: "Слово о полку Игореве", Moscow International House of Music, 2013), "Stimmung" (Karlheinz Stockhausen), and Falún (Béla Bartók) among others. In 2018, the Ensemble won the Yuri Lubimov Public Award. In 2023 the Dmitry Pokrovsky Ensemble celebrated its 50th anniversary with a series of concerts. The anniversary performance "From Folklore to Avant-garde" took place on February 15 at the Moscow Conservatory. In 2023 the Ensemble presented the premiere of a musical fantasy on the theme of Fyodor Sologub's fairy tale "Night Dances"./. In 2025 the Ensemble's artists took part in the ethno-opera by I.Matvienko "Prince Vladimir".

== Discography ==
- 1978 — Russian Folk Polyphony (Russian: Русское народное многоголосие). Мелодия USSR
- 1983 — Кругозор (журнал, СССР) USSR.
- 1988 — Камбурова, Елена Антоновна (Russian: «...Да осенит тишина»). Мелодия USSR
- 1987 — Earthbeat. Living Music, US
- 1988 — Paul Winter Wolf Eyes (Russian: Волчьи глаза). Living Music, US
- 1989\1991 — Faces of Russia (Russian: Лица России). Trikont Label, US
- 1990 — Holy Evening (Russian: Святой вечер). Bally Bally Rec US
- 1991 — Earth (Voices of a Planet). (Paul Winter Consort & Friends). Living Music, US
- 1991 — The Wild Field (Russian: Дикое поле). Realworld, US
- 1992 — Us Peter Gabriel (track 1) Realworld, US
- 1994 — Les noces (Russian: Свадебка), Igor Stravinsky. Electra Nonesuch, US
- 1994 — Solstice Live (Paul Winter Consort & Friends) Living Music, US
- 1999 — Night in Galicia (Russian: В. Мартынов, "Ночь в Галиции") Erdenklang musikverlag, CCn'C, Germany
- 2000 — Anton Batagov Best before 02.2000 Long Arms Rec (Russian: Длинные руки), Russia
- 2001(2014 reissue) — Mother Russia. Fivepro Records, Russia
- 2001 — Alexander Raskatov Voices of Frozen Land (Russian: А. Раскатов. Голоса замёрзшей земли) NBE LIVE, Netherlands
- 2005 — Anton Batagov From to beginning up to the end (Russian: С Начала и до Конца). Long Arms Rec, Russia
- 2005 — Silver Solstice (Paul Winter Consort & Friends) Earth Music Production, LLC, US
- 2008 — Nor close to town nor far (Russian: Неблизко от города недалёко...). Russia
- 2008-2009 — Russian Chorus Music:Pokrovsky Ensemble (The worlds roots music library). King Record Co.Ltd. Japan.
- 2010 (recording)-2014 (edition) — Kursky Songs (Russian: "Курские песни" Георгия Свиридова и старинные песни Курской губернии). Russia
- 2010 (recording)-2014 (edition) — Vivat Russia! (Russian: Виват Россия!Песни петровских времен). Russia
- 2016 — Human Lives as Grass Grows 2 CD (Russian: Человек живет – как трава растет. Духовная музыка). Russia
- 2016 — Alexey Shelygin The Tale of Igor's Campaign (Russian: Слово о полку Игореве). Russia
- 2016 — Iraida Yusupova Russian Album, to the twentieth anniversary of cooperation with Pokrovsky Ensemble (Russian: Русский альбом Ираиды Юсуповой, к двадцатилетию сотрудничества с Ансамблем Дмитрия Покровского). Russia
- 2020 — Remember You in Songs (2 CD, Songs of the World war 1) (Russian: В песнях вспомним о вас). Russia
- 2020 — The Flame of Battle and Love (2 CD, Songs of the Patriotic war of 1812) (Russian: И битвы пламень и любви). Russia
