= Paul Sullivan (composer) =

Paul Sullivan (born July 31, 1955) is an American Grammy Award winning pianist and composer whose music blends jazz and classical styles. He is a member of the Paul Winter Consort.

== Early life, education and early career ==
Sullivan was born and grew up in Boston, Massachusetts. He attended St. Paul's Choir School from its founding in 1963 until 1969. He graduated from Phillips Exeter Academy in 1973 and Yale University in 1977. Sullivan began playing jazz in New Haven, and moved to New York City in 1978 where he performed at Bradley's and other major jazz clubs. He had a variety of freelance jobs including playing for and conducting Broadway shows.

== Starting a record company ==
In 1988 Sullivan moved to Brooklin, Maine to write music. He and his wife, Jillson Knowles, founded the record company River Music.

Sullivan is co-creator of the performance piece A Terrible Beauty, which is based on The Law of Dreams by Peter Behrens. The piece was performed in Maine and off-Broadway in New York City in 2010.

His jazz ballad "Whisper" was a finalist in the 2009 International Songwriting Competition. The song was recorded by Theresa Thomason, with whom he regularly performs, and appears on his album Break Away with his jazz ensemble PS Jazz.

In the 1990s his record label published books on tape, which included White on White, a selection of E.B. White essays read by Joel White.

Sullivan's first major choral work, River, premiered in 2010 by the Bagaduce Chorale of Blue Hill, Maine. He has composed for the Pilobolus Dance Theater.

== Writing ==
Sullivan is also known for his writing. In the spring of 1994 he attended the International Cello Festival in Manchester England with Eugene Friesen. Sullivan's story about this event called "The Cellist of Sarajevo" was published in Hope Magazine, Reader's Digest, The Book of Hope, Life Touched With Wonder: Windows of Hope and numerous blogs.

== Awards ==
Sullivan received a Grammy Award as a member of the Paul Winter Consort for the 2006 album Silver Solstice. He received two NAIRD Indie Awards. In 1992 he won in the category of Seasonal Music for Christmas in Maine, and in 1997 he won in the category of Spoken Word for White on White.

== Discography ==
- 1987: Sketches of Maine
- 1988: A Visit to the Rockies
- 1990: Folk Art
- 1991: Nights in the Gardens of Maine
- 1992: Christmas in Maine
- 1993: A Paul Sullivan Collection
- 1993: Wild Fox - book on tape
- 1995: Half Truths and Whole Lies - book on tape
- 1996: Circle 'Round the Seasons
- 1996: White on White - book on tape
- 1996: 50s Slow Dance
- 1997: More 50s Slow Dances
- 1998: 60s Sweet and Bittersweet
- 1998: Young at Heart
- 1999: Slow Sweet Swing
- 2002: Songs Without Words
- 2003: Yuletide
- 2005: Silver Solstice - Grammy Award winner
- 2007: Christmas in Maine - guest appearance
- 2007: My Irish Soul
- 2008: Break Away
- 2010: Amazing Music of Maine - guest appearance
- 2010: Painters, Poets and Players - guest appearance
- 2011: Christmas Pure and Simple - with Rosie Upton
- 2011: Paul & Theresa: Favorite Duos, Vol. 1 - with Theresa Thomason
