= Celtic Solstice =

Studio album by Paul Winter
- Released: February 9, 1999
- Genre: Celtic, new-age
- Length: 57:33
- Label: Living Music

Professional ratings
Review scores
Source	Rating
Allmusic	4.5/5 stars

Celtic Solstice is an album by Paul Winter, released in 1999 through the record label Living Music. In 2000, the album earned him a Grammy Award for Best New Age Album.

== Track listing ==
1. "Triumph" (Halley, Spillane, Winter) – 7:06
2. "Golden Apples of the Sun" (W. B. Yeats, Travis Edmonson) – 6:25
3. "Hollow Hills" (Spillane) – 1:55
4. "O'Farrell's Welcome to Limerick" (traditional) – 4:36
5. "Dawnwalker" (Halley, Spillane) – 6:43
6. "My Fair and Faithful Love/Blarney Pilgram" (Maclean, traditional) – 5:23
7. "Sweet Comeraghs" (Faoli·in) – 3:55
8. "After the Fleadh/Running Through the Woods With Keetu" (Fahy, Madden) – 6:45
9. "The Minister's Adieu" (Thomas) – 2:09
10. "Farewell to Govan" (Cunningham) – 2:58
11. "Golden Apples of the Sun (Reprise)" – 7:06
12. "Dawnwalker (Reprise)" (Halley, Spillane) – 2:32

== Personnel ==
- Paul Winter – soprano saxophone
- Joanie Madden – flute and whistle
- Davy Spillane – uilleann pipes
- Jerry O'Sullivan – uilleann pipes
- Paul Halley – pipe organ and piano
- Eileen Ivers – fiddle
- Carol Thompson – Celtic harp and Welsh triple harp
- Zan McLoed – guitar
- Bakithi Kumalo – bass
- Austin McGrath – bodhrán
- Jamey Haddad – percussion
- Karan Casey – vocals

== See also ==
- Celtic music in the United States
- Folk music of Ireland
