= The Song of Wandering Aengus =

1897 poem by W. B. Yeats

"The Song of Wandering Aengus" is a poem by Irish poet W. B. Yeats. It was first printed in 1897 in British magazine The Sketch under the title "A Mad Song." It was then published under its standard name in Yeats' 1899 anthology The Wind Among the Reeds. It is especially remembered for its two final lines: "The silver apples of the moon,/ The golden apples of the sun."

The poem is told from the point of view of an old man who, at some point in his past, had a fantastical experience in which a silver trout he had caught and laid on the floor turned into a "glimmering girl" who called him by his name, then vanished; he became infatuated with her, and remains devoted to finding her again.

In an 1899 letter to fellow poet Dora Sigerson, Yeats called "The Song of Wandering Aengus" "the kind of poem I like best myself—a ballad that gradually lifts ... from circumstantial to purely lyrical writing."

== Meaning and inspiration ==
Yeats later said that "the poem was suggested to me by a Greek folk song; but the folk belief of Greece is very like that of Ireland, and I certainly thought, when I wrote it, of Ireland, and of the spirits that are in Ireland." At least one scholar has pointed to the Greek folk song "The Fruit of the Apple Tree" as the likely source of Yeats' inspiration. That song was included in a volume of Greek poetry translated by Lucy Garnett, of which Yeats had written a review in 1896.

It has been claimed that the poem's story is based on the Irish god Aengus, and specifically the story of the "Dream of Aengus", which had first appeared in the 8th century, in which Aengus falls in love with a woman whom he sees only in his dreams.

The poem has also been compared to the aisling genre of Irish poetry, in which a magical woman appears who represents the country of Ireland.

== Cultural references ==
The phrases "the silver apples of the moon" and "the golden apples of the sun" have both inspired the names of various bands (including the Silver Apples), albums (including Silver Apples of the Moon by Morton Subotnick), books (including The Golden Apples of the Sun by Ray Bradbury and The Golden Apples by Eudora Welty) and films.

In the 2002 episode "Rogue Planet" of the TV series Star Trek: Enterprise, a member of a shape-shifting, telepathic alien species takes the form of a young woman to communicate with Captain Jonathan Archer, based on Archer's own childhood memories of hearing the poem.

The poem is also referenced in the 1992 novel The Bridges of Madison County and its 1995 film adaptation, as well as in The Leftovers episode "No Room at the Inn" (2015).

== Musical adaptations ==
The most famous musical setting of the poem was by Travis Edmonson of the folk duo Bud & Travis. Edmonson titled the song "Golden Apples of the Sun", and it was released on the 1960 Bud & Travis album Naturally: Folk Songs for the Present. Their version has been covered, sometimes as "Golden Apples of the Sun" and sometimes as "The Song of Wandering Aengus", by artists including Judy Collins (on the album Golden Apples of the Sun, 1962), Terry Callier (on The New Folk Sound of Terry Callier, 1965), Dave Van Ronk (on No Dirty Names, 1966), Christy Moore (on Ride On, 1984), Karan Casey (on Songlines, 1997), Paul Winter (on Celtic Solstice, 1999), 10,000 Maniacs (on Twice Told Tales, 2015) and Tiny Ruins (on Hurtling Through, 2015).

Additionally, the poem was set to music by Donovan (on HMS Donovan, 1971), and its Italian cover was recorded by Angelo Branduardi (on Branduardi canta Yeats, 1986). Other adaptations include those by The Waterboys (on An Appointment with Mr Yeats, 2011), and Johnny Flynn (on Sillion, 2017).

The song was also used on the last track of the album The Dream We Carry (2024) by Revolutionary Army of the Infant Jesus. The track contains the poem read by Tom O'Bedlam.
