= Spanish Angel =

Spanish Angel may refer to:

- Spanish Angel, a ring name used by Angel Medina (wrestler)
- Spanish Angel (album), a 1993 album by Paul Winter Consort
