= Earthbeat =

Earthbeat may refer to:

- Earthbeat (The Future Sound of London album), 1992
- Earthbeat (Paul Winter album), 1987
