= Yousif Sheronick =

American percussionist, arranger and composer

Yousif Sheronick (born 1967, Cedar Rapids, IA) is a percussionist, arranger, and composer, who works in classical, world, jazz and rock genres.

== Biography ==
The child of Lebanese immigrants, Sheronick graduated from Thomas Jefferson High School in Cedar Rapids in 1985, earned an undergraduate music degree at the University of Iowa, where his principal teacher was Thomas L. Davis, and then a master's degree at Yale University in 1991; his principal teacher at Yale was de:Gordon Gottlieb. He moved to New York where he worked with Glen Velez, whom he considers a mentor and in whose ensemble Handance he has been a long-term member.

Since 1996 he has been a member of the Ethos Percussion Group. He has toured internationally with Foday Musa Suso and Philip Glass in a production of Glass's The Screens, and has also performed with Yo-Yo Ma, Branford Marsalis, Sonny Fortune, Cindy Blackman-Santana, Paul Winter and, most recently, duoJalal with violist and wife Kathryn Lockwood of the Lark Quartet.

He has published compositions and instructional videos, and has recorded with Ethos, Jalal, the Lark Quartet, and in a solo CD.
