= Songlines (Karan Casey album) =

Studio album by Karan Casey
- Released: 1997
- Recorded: 1997
- Genre: Irish traditional Celtic; Indie
- Length: 42:00
- Label: Shanachie
- Producer: Seamus Egan

Songlines is the debut album by Irish traditional singer Karan Casey.

== Track listing ==
1. Roger the Miller
2. She Is Like the Swallow
3. Ballad of Accounting
4. Shamrock Shore
5. Martinmas Time
6. Buachaillin Ban
7. Creggan White Hare
8. Song of Wandering Aengus (W. B. Yeats, Travis Edmonson)
9. One, I Love
10. World Turned Upside Down (The Digger's Song)
11. Labouring Man's Daughter
