= Common Ground (Paul Winter album) =

Studio album by Paul Winter
- Released: 1978
- Genre: Jazz
- Length: 43:26
- Label: A&M
- Producer: David Green, Oscar Castro Neves, Paul Winter

Paul Winter chronology
Common Ground (1978)	Callings (1980)

Common Ground is an album released by Paul Winter in 1978 for A&M Records Inc. Songs on the album include elements of different musical styles coupled with the sounds of whales, wolves and eagles. A live wolf was used in some concerts for the 1978 tour supporting the album such at New Haven's Woolsey Hall.

== Track listing ==
1. "Ancient Voices (Nhemamusasa)"
2. "Eagle"
3. "Icarus"
4. "The Promise of a Fisherman (Iemanja)"
5. "Ocean Dream"
6. "Trio"
7. "Common Ground (Velho Sermão)"
8. "Lay Down Your Burden" (sung by Susan Osborn)
9. "Wolf Eyes"
10. "Duet"
11. "Midnight (Minuit)"
12. "Trilogy"
