= Iraida Yusupova =

Turkmen composer (born 1962)

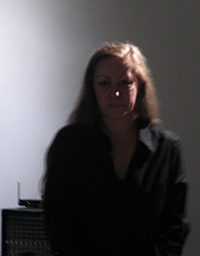
Iraida Yusupova, 2008

Iraida Yusupova (born February 20, 1962) is a Turkmenistani composer of half Russian half Tatar ethnicity who lives in Moscow, Russia.

Iraida Yusupova was born in Ashgabat, Turkmen SSR, and graduated from Moscow Conservatory with a degree in composition in 1987. She has written and composed 3 operas, 2 symphonies, 6 cantatas, 3 instrumental concerts, and a great deal of chamber music, electro-acoustic music, and music for cinema and theater spanning over the late eighties to the present day. Her various styles include minimalism, serialism, and several progressive new age styles. Her music has been performed in Germany, Austria, France, Italy, Sweden, Belgium, United States, Switzerland, Turkey and Hungary.

== Festival participation ==
Mrs. Yusupova has been a continual participant in numerous musical festivals such as Alternative, Moscow Autumn, Moscow forum, and has participated in the music festivals Bach - 2000, White Night’s Stars, Gent-Moscow-Gent, Klang och Rubel, Delphi’s Games, Austrian Cultural Forum, David Oistrakh’s Festival, and the Wean Hean festival.

== Works ==
- Sonata for oboe and piano (1987)
- Concerto for harp with orchestra "Arpa-amplificata" (1987)
- Octet in memory of Igor Stravinsky (1989)
- "Incantation of Elements" for symphony orchestra and tape (1989)
- "Dreams' Music", version for cello-solo (1990)
- "Dreams' Music", version for violin-solo (1990)
- "In Front of the Mirror", saloon's triptych (1990). Based on texts by Vera Pavlova.
- "Emily's Revelations", cantata for mezzo-soprano and symphony orchestra (1990). Based on a text by Emily Dickinson.
- Brass quintet (1990)
- "Sound's Traveling" for percussion and soprano -saxophone (1990)
- "Etudes by Steiniz" for two wind instruments and organ (1991)
- "Ginekeum", electronic composition (1991)
- "Sailing Off" for saxophones' quartet (1992)
- "Willows' Flowering III, chamber cantata (1992)
- "Moses' Tomb", electronic composition (1992)
- "Eine Grosse Nachtmusik", chamber symphony (1993)
- Concert for oboe and chamber orchestra (1993)
- "Winds' Rose" for chamber orchestra and piano in memory of Nikolay Sydelnikov (1993)
- "Babiloon's mystery", symphony (1994)
- "Two Small Canons on English Poets' Texts", chamber cantata (1994)
- "Astrolatreya", divertissement for ensemble of soloists in two versions (1994)
- "Arlecinata", divertissement for ensemble of soloists (1994)
- "The Waiting", small concert for oboe-solo and tape (1994)
- "The Birth of Venus" for brass quintet and one or more grand pianos (1994)
- "Sonata Without First Movement" for piano (1994)
- "Canon-Elegy" for piano (1994). Dedicated to Ivan Sokolov.
- "Gone Years' Reminiscences" for one or more pianos (1994)
- "Nikola Veshny", composition for domra, flute and piano (1994). In memory of Nikolay Sydelnikov.
- "Composition in Memory of Igor Severyarnin" for domra-solo (1994). Co-authored by Sergey Nevrayev.
- "Postlude-Dedication, or Variation on a Basque Folk Theme", composition for domra, two pianos and computer (1994)
- "The Birth of Venus" for symphony orchestra and tape (1995). Dedicated to Anastasia Braudo Jr.
- "Opera-Kryptophonic", opera (1995). Co-authored by Sergey Nevrayev and Ivan Sokolov.
- "Ex Voto" for ensemble of soloists (1995). Dedicated to Alexander Dolgin.
- "Willows' Flowering IV, or Almost Etruscan Text" (1995)Several versions.
- "The Critique of Pure Reason", for ensemble of soloists or chamber orchestra (1995). Dedicated to Alexander Babulevich.
- "Thou Art My Soul" for descant, cello and piano (1996). Based on a text from a canon by Saint Andrew of Crete.
- "The Well in Haroldsbach", fantasy and choral for harpsichord (1996)
- Etude for flute solo (1996)
- "Sailing Off" for saxophones' quartet and tape (1996)
- "Sailing Off" for saxophones' quartet and two tapes (1996)
- "Sailing Off" for saxophones' quartet and soprano (1996)
- "Sailing Off" for saxophones' quartet, tape and soprano (1996)
- "The Last Sound's Traveling" for cello and percussion (1996)
- "Alla Mente" for piano (1996)
- "Strange Shores", suite for harp-solo (1997)
- "Virgins' Singing on the Syon-Mountain", composition for Dmitry Pokrovsky Ensemble for violin, two cellos, keyboard goosly and tape (1997)Updated version of computer mixing in 2000.
- "Opera-Marina" (1995-1998)Its separate parts exist as independent works titled "The Birth of Venus", "Sailing Off" and "Waiting".
- "The Birth of Venus" for brass quintet, one or more grand pianos and tape (1998)
- "Ex voto II" for ensemble of soloists (1998)
- "Ex voto III" for Dmitry Pokrovsky Ensemble (1998). Based on a text by Gennady Aygy.
- "No More the Sea, or New Sound's Traveling" (1998). Two versions for tape and several versions for Dmitry Pokrovsky Ensemble and tape.
- "Retro-Suite", multimedia project for Dmitry Pokrovsky Ensemble (1998)
- "Cadenza and Coda for cello with orchestra", composition for enveloping cello with symphony orchestra and tape (1998)
- "Faust Fragments", mystery (1999)
- "Pushkin-Triptych" for Dmitry Pokrovsky Ensemble (1999)
- "Sequences", composition for piano and cello (1999)
- "Mefisto-Garden. The Seasons", multimedia project of four parts (1995-2000). Several versions of each part.
- "Children's cantata" for children's choir, piano and tape (2000). Based on a text by Gennady Aygy.
- "The Dull Songs of the Earth", chamber cantata (2000). Based on a text by Mikhail Lermontov.
- "South", composition from multimedia project by Tatiana Mikheyeva, Iraida Yusupova, Sergey Zagniy and Dmitry Cheglakov "Several Different Directions" (2000)
- "Christmas Mystery For Silhouette Theater" (2000). Script by Inna Kolosova.
- "Prayer" for male choir, cello and double-base (2000). Based on texts by Grand Duchess Olga of Russia.
- "Three Meditations on Baptist Script" from "Passions 2000" (2000). Based on texts by Leonid Bely, Vera Pavlova, Vyacheslav Kurizin. With Dmitry Cheglakov's parting.
- "In the Country of the Blind", performance-installation (2000)
- "Unnamed", composition for soprano and cello with chamber orchestra and tape (2000). Updated version for soprano and cello with chamber orchestra in 2003.
- "The Birds", multimedia project (1999-2001). Several versions.
- Fragments of collective opera "Tsar Demyan" (2001). Co-authored by Leonid Desyatnikov, Vladimir Nikolayev, Vyacheslav Gayvoronsky, creative group "Composer".
- "In the Country of the Blind II", composition for chamber orchestra and computer (2001)
- "In the Country of the Blind III", composition for piano and computer (2001)
- "PolyCordia", composition for Irish harp, cello, piano and tape (2001). Dedicated to Pyotr Kondrashin.
- "Dies Irae" for counter-tenor, basso-profound and ensemble of soloists (2001)
- "Music By Someone Else", composition for ensemble of soloists (2001). In several versions.
- "Shepherds and Angels", mystery-loobock (2002)Widened version - Cyber-musical. Based on texts by Vera Pavlova. Updated version for Dmitry Pokrovsky Ensemble in 2003.
- "Eine Kleine Morgenmusik", composition in my father's memory for piano solo (2002)
- "Cherubic" for chorus a capella (2002)Instrumental version also 2002. Electroacoustic version also 2002.
- "More", electro-acoustic composition (2002)
- “Pastorale”, fantasy on Adolf Venzel, themes for cello and piano (2003)
- “Prayer”, version for full choir and piano (2003)
- “NOSFERATU-symphony” for chamber ensemble and video-projection (2003). Live sound track for F. W. Murnau's film Nosferatu (1924).
- “On my way to Damascus” for chamber ensemble (2003)
- “Kitezh–11” for organ and tape (2003)
- “Kitezh–14” for violin, ovaloid and tape (2003)
- “The Tin Little Soldier”, composition for Bosze Saloon Orchestra (2003)
- “Dies irae – 2”, composition for Dmitry Pokrovsky Ensemble and tape (2003)
- “Aelita”, opera-karaoke - multimedia project (2003). Based on author’s remix of Yakov Protazanov's film Aelita (1924) and photodigidroms by Alexander Dolgin. Libretto by Vera Pavlova. Created specially for the opening of Alexander Dolgin’s exhibition.
- "Shepherds and Angels", updated version for Dmitry Pokrovsky Ensemble (2003)
- "Unnamed", updated version for soprano and cello with chamber orchestra (2003)
- “Ave Maria” by Adolf Venzel in different chamber arrangements (2003)
- “Why do I love you so much?” (Adolf Venzel) for full or female choir and piano with (or without) string quintet (2003)Fragment from the imaginary musical “Her First ball”.
- “A recollection of interrupted song” in memory of Luigi Nono, electro-acoustic performance (2003)
- “Kitezh–19” for Theremin-voice (or 2 Theremin-voices) and tape (2004)
- “Kitezh–22” for tape (2004)
- "Prayer", version for male choir and chamber orchestra (2004). Based on texts by Great Princess Olga Romanova.
- "Cherubic" for male choir and cello (2004)
- “Einstein and Margarita”, opera in four acts with preface and epilogue (2004). Libretto By Vera Pavlova and Iraida Yusupova in collaboration with Steven Seymour.
- “Un bergantin”, composition for mixed choir with contrabass and piano (2005). Based on a text of José de Espronceda.
- Version of "Prayer" for male choir and organ (2005). Based on texts by Great Princess Olga Romanova.
- “Ballada” – composition for poet, singer, harp and recorders with tape (2005). Based on a text of Dmitry Prigov.
- “Winds’ Rose – 2", sound-installation for string orchestra and piano (2005)
- “Sax-n-roll”, electroacoustic composition (2005)
- “Mermaids’ dance", electroacoustic composition (2005)
- “Composition with organ”, electroacoustic composition (2005)
- “Gothic cantata” for mixed choir, oboe, cello, organ and harp (2006). Based on a text of Dmitry Prigov.
- "Gone Century's Reminiscences", six choruses on canonical and non-canonical texts for mixed choir (and tape/tapes) (2006)
- “Real and impossible”, media-opera (2006)
- “Welcome to Paradise”, media-ballet (2006). Based on Dante Alighieri’s La Divina Commedia.
- "Willows' Flowering V”, chamber cantata for soprano, piano and tape (2006), based on texts by Vera Pavlova.

== Recordings ==
Her composition Kitezh–19 appears on the album "Touch! Don't Touch!" a collection of contemporary music for theremin; however, few recordings have been made of her works and little is actually known about them.
