= Theresa Thomason =

American gospel music singer

- Genres: Christian
- Occupations: Singer, producer
- Years active: mid-1990s–present
- Labels: Sacred Sounds Music

Theresa Thomason is an American Gospel music singer.

== Musical career ==
Theresa Thomason reached the airwaves with Fresh Enuff, a popular club single, and delivered a winning performance at the Apollo Theater in New York City. She toured Europe for over ten years, performing in more than 150 cities. She remains a featured artist with the Paul Winter Consort at the annual Solstice, Missa Gaia, and Earth Mass celebrations at St. John the Divine, the world-renowned cathedral in New York City. Many of these performances were televised on PBS and NBC. Thomason has also performed live at the United Nations for the Dalai Lama, to sold-out crowds at the American Mural Project (LIVE @AMP), and elsewhere.

In 1999, Thomason collaborated with composer Paul Halley on the Pelagos recording of "Sound Over All Waters". They continue to perform this piece together in various formats across Europe, New Zealand, New York, Canada, and Connecticut.

Thomason appeared onstage with the American progressive metal band Dream Theater during the Metropolis 2000 world tour, having previously contributed to their Metropolis Pt. 2: Scenes from a Memory album. In addition to reprising her vocal parts from the album, Thomason sang on "John and Theresa Solo Spot", improvising over a John Petrucci guitar solo, and performed on "The Spirit Carries On". The performances were filmed and released on DVD and CD under the title Metropolis 2000: Scenes From New York.

Thomason's newest CD release, Ten Hymns, is her first solo recording. Released in 2004 for a specialized project through Sacred Sounds Music, it is regarded as acoustic gospel. She was also the featured soloist on the jazz project Breakaway by Paul Sullivan of River Music.

Thomason continued to perform with Dream Theater, delivering Clare Torry's famous vocal improvisation on "The Great Gig in the Sky" when the band covered Pink Floyd's The Dark Side of the Moon at the Heineken Music Hall in Amsterdam, the Netherlands, on October 11, 2005, and at the Hammersmith Apollo in London on October 25, 2005. The London show was recorded and subsequently released on both DVD and CD through Dream Theater's YtseJam Records.

Thomason has toured for over thirteen years in the most hallowed theaters of Europe and performed at the Vatican in 2005. Her career has spanned over two decades of performances and recordings with the Grammy Award-winning Paul Winter Consort, Pete Seeger, Dream Theater, renowned conductor John Rutter, actor and activist Ruby Dee, jazz group FRENS, and many others. Thomason continues to expand her range, style, and creativity and has her own acclaimed musical production called "The Sisterhood".

Theresa Thomason has performed in "Hot Feet", the Broadway musical conceived, choreographed, and directed by Maurice Hines, featuring music from Earth, Wind & Fire. She is set to return to Europe with her production of "The Sisters" in the winter/spring of 2009. Recently, Thomason performed two sold-out concerts at the Zenith in Strasbourg, France, and at Les Dominicains De Haute Alsace, marking a first for the Protestant Union in France.
