= Icarus (Paul Winter Consort album) =

Studio album by Paul Winter Consort
- Released: 1 May 1972
- Studio: Sea Weed Studios, Marblehead, MA; Electric Lady Studios, New York City; The Record Plant, New York City; Upsurge Studios, New York City; mixed at AIR Studios, London
- Genre: Chamber jazz, contemporary classical
- Label: Epic
- Producer: George Martin

Paul Winter Consort chronology
Road (1970)	Icarus (1972)	Earthdance (1977)

Icarus is the fourth album by American musical group Paul Winter Consort. It was recorded in 1971 for the Epic Records label and released in 1972. It was re-released by Epic in 1978 and by Living Music in 1984. The album was produced by George Martin.

== Critical reception ==
Professional ratings
Review scores
Source	Rating
Christgau's Record Guide	B+

Reviewing for Creem in 1973, Robert Christgau called Icarus a "kind of a classical/jazz mix but with none of the stiffness that suggests—inquisitive, contemplative, eclectic, peaceful. And eloquent, much more eloquent than my description, which does more for the music than the lyrics that obstruct a couple of cuts." Michael Tearson from Audio later said the music can be called "chamber jazz". In a retrospective review, AllMusic's William Ruhlmann gave Icarus three-and-a-half out of five stars and said "Winter's finest album marks a transitional point in his career from jazz to his own brand of contemporary instrumental. But one can simply revel in the lovely melodies, the contemplative sounds, and the tasteful production of George Martin, especially on the justly famous title track by Ralph Towner."

== Track listing ==
1. "Icarus" (Ralph Towner) - 3:02
2. "Ode to a Fillmore Dressing Room" (David Darling) - 5:32
3. "The Silence of a Candle" (Towner) - 3:22
4. "Sunwheel" (Towner) - 4:52
5. "Juniper Bear" (Collin Walcott) - 3:10
6. "Whole Earth Chant" (Walcott, Paul Winter) - 7:42
7. "All the Mornings Bring" (Paul McCandless) - 3:48
8. "Chehalis and Other Voices" (Towner) - 5:26
9. "Minuit" (J.S. Bach adaptation, Paul Winter) - 3:06

== Personnel ==
- Paul Winter – soprano saxophone, vocals
- Ralph Towner – classical guitar, 12–string guitar, steel–string guitar, piano, bush organ, regal organ, vocals
- Collin Walcott – drums, kettledrums, congas, surdo, tabla, mridangam, bass marimba, sitar
- Paul McCandless – oboe, English horn, contrabass sarrusophone, vocals
- David Darling – cello, vocals
- Herb Bushler – bass guitar

== Other Musicians ==
- Billy Cobham – drums on "Sunwheel" and "Whole Earth Chant"
- Milt Holland – Ghanaian percussion on "Whole Earth Chant"
- Larry Atamanuik – drums on "Icarus"
- Barry Altschul – random percussion
- Andrew Tracey – dobro on "Minuit"
- Janet Johnson, Paul McCandless, Bob Milstein, Paul Stookey – chorus on "Minuit"
