= Enzo Rao =

Italian musician

Enzo Rao (born 13 January 1957 in Palermo) is an Italian musician who plays a number of instruments, including bass guitar, oud, saz, jaw harp and violin, in a variety of folk and popular styles. He has performed with artists like Rakali, Glen Velez and Claudio Lo Cascio. In 1988 he founded the project Shamal which combines music from across the Mediterranean region. Rao has won the first prize in the National Composer Contest held by Radio RAI for his song "In viaggio!". Rao has also worked in composition for film scores.
