= Silver Solstice =

Live album by Paul Winter Consort and Friends
- Released: December 6, 2005
- Genre: New-age
- Label: Living Music

Paul Winter Consort and Friends chronology
Spanish Angel (1993)	Silver Solstice (2005)	Crestone (2007)

Silver Solstice is a live album by Paul Winter Consort and friends, including organist Dorothy Papadakos, released in 2005 through the record label Living Music. In 2006, the album earned the group a Grammy Award for Best New Age Album.

== Track listing ==
Disc 1

1. "Opening Calls" - 4:03
2. "Tomorrow Is My Dancing Day" (Traditional) - 3:02
3. "Sun Singer" (Halley, Winter) - 4:58
4. "Wound Over All Waters" (Halley, Whittier) - 4:32
5. "Kurski Funk" (Castro-Neves, Halley, Traditional, Winter) - 4:19
6. "Dawnwalker" (Spillane) - 6:46
7. "Before It's Too Late" (Tuncboyaciyan) - 5:21
8. "Harvest Faire" (Winter) - 4:43
9. "Sara" (Berry, Traditional) - 5:33
10. "Seoladh" (Traditional) - 5:15
11. "Cathedral Forest" (Halley) - 5:45
12. "Belly of the Whale" (Friesen, Humpback Whale, Sullivan) - 5:29
13. "Solstice Tree" (Cahn, Traditional, Uirapur, Winter) - 3:28
14. "Storm" - 1:12
15. "Bells of Solstice" (Traditional) - 1:33
16. "Return of the Sun" (Halley) - 1:26
17. "Solstice Chant" (Halley) - 2:14

Disc 2

1. "Caravan at Dawn" (Hart, Rudess, Tuncboyaciyan, Winter) - 6:23
2. "The Lake" (Halley) - 4:33
3. "Luiza" (Jobim) - 2:41
4. "Canyon Chaconne" (Halley, Winter) - 6:27
5. "First Ride" (Friesen, Halley) - 4:34
6. "Icarus" (Towner) - 3:14
7. "The Rain Is Over and Gone" (Halley) - 5:48
8. "The Cello and the Pipes" (Friesen, Spillane) - 3:55
9. "The Rising Moon" (Sullivan) - 5:05
10. "Down in Belgorod" (Castro-Neves, Friesen, Halley, Winter) - 3:39
11. "Oror Bubrik" (Tuncboyaciyan) - 6:17
12. "Silent Night" (Traditional) - 3:00
13. "Song for the World" (Halley, Traditional) - 3:18
14. "Wolf Eyes" (Darling, Timber Wolf, Winter) - 8:12
15. "Minuit/Auld Lang Syne" (Fodeba, Guth, Osborn, Traditional) - 5:43
