= Whales Alive =

Studio album by Paul Winter, Paul Halley
- Released: September 15, 1987
- Genre: New age
- Length: 48:01
- Label: Living Music
- Producer: Roger Payne, Paul Winter

Paul Winter chronology
Wintersong (1986)	Whales Alive (1987)	Earthbeat (1987)

Paul Halley chronology
New Friend (1986)	Whales Alive (1987)	Angel on a Stone Wall (1991)

Whales Alive is a 1987 album of improvisational duets and sometimes trios between Paul Winter, Paul Halley, and recordings of humpback whales. Winter and Halley also collaborate with Leonard Nimoy, who reads poems and prose from various writers, including D. H. Lawrence and Roger Payne. The audio recordings made of the whales for this recording were used in the Star Trek IV: The Voyage Home (Nov. 1986) movie (for which Nimoy directed and reprised his character Spock), featuring the whales nicknamed "George and Gracie".

== Track listing ==
1. "Whales Weep Not! Lullaby From The Great Mother Whale For The Baby Seal Pups"
2. "Dawnwatch"
3. "George and Gracie"
4. "Turning"
5. "Concerto For Whale And Organ"
6. "Humphrey's Blues"
7. "Queequeg and I - The Water Is Wide"
8. "Ocean Dream"
9. "The Voyage Home"

== Personnel ==
- Paul Winter- soprano sax
- Paul Halley- organ
- Leonard Nimoy- readings
