= Alexander Dolgin =

Cypriot economist

- Born: January 17, 1961 (age 65); Kyiv
- Education: National University of Science and Technology MISiS
- Scientific career
- Fields: Physics, economics

Alexander Borisovich Dolgin (born January 17, 1961; Kyiv) is a Russian entrepreneur, metallurgist, and professor. He was manager of the Imhonet recommendation service, which closed in 2017.

== Education ==
Dolgin graduated from the Moscow State Institute of Steel and Alloys with a degree in metal physics in 1983. He is a Candidate of Technical Sciences and an author of more than 300 scientific articles. He studied the properties of metals.

== Career ==
Dolgin founded and led the metallurgical holding Soyuznikhrom from 1992 until 2006. This venture included the Vladimir plant of precision alloys, the Factory of Metal Hoses, and NPO Magneton. He founded the scientific research fund Pragmatics of Culture in 2001. He became a professor at the National Research University Higher School of Economics in 2003. Dolgin founded the development company Urban Group and the Internet recommendation service Imhonet in 2007. He was the first investor in the online book trading service Litres. Alexander published journals Logos (philosophy) and Critical Mass (culturology) in 2001.

Dolgin became a citizen of Cyprus in 2016.

Dolgin owns the companies DCA (Digital Centric Alliance), internet counter Openstat, and DSL.

Dolgin's research topics include the economy of symbolic exchange, the quality of subjective personal time, degrading selection in information markets, inter-externalities (intrapersonal externalities), autoreputation, crowdsourcing expertise (user-certified content), advertising on trust, specification of rights to freedom of speech.

== Scientific activity ==
Since 2001, Dolgin has been involved in the economics of culture, acting as an ideologist of voluntary post-factum payments (donations), seeking their institutionalization.

From 2003 to 2014, Dolgin was a professor and head of the Department of Economics of Culture at the Higher School of Economics, Moscow. Taught the course “Economics of Symbolic Exchange”.

In 2004, Dolgin invented and developed a recommendation system based on collaborative filtering, which became the basis of a popular recommendation service for books, music, movies, travel, games, etc.

In 2006, Dolgin conducted large-scale social experiments with donations in theaters and cinemas (experiments with post-factum payment "Cinema" and "Teatron") with the task of studying people's readiness to donate.

In 2010, Dolgin held a Reader's Prize, during which the winners were determined by popular vote in money. This was a continuation of the series of social experiments “Cinema” and “Theatron”.

Currently he runs the digital society laboratory and is preparing for publication the book “The Future of Money,” in which he puts forward the idea of a public institution of status and reputation based on donations.

Author's terms and concepts: economy of symbolic exchange, quality of subjective personal time, worsening selection in information markets, inter-externalities (intrapersonal externalities), auto-reputation, crowdsourcing expertise (user-certificated content), advertising on trust, specification of rights to freedom of speech.

== Publications ==
Alexander has published three books and over one hundred articles. Two books have been translated into English.

- Dolgin, Alexander (2008-10-06). The Economics of Symbolic Exchange. Springer Science & Business Media. ISBN 978-3-540-79882-8.
- Dolgin, Alexander (2011-09-20). Manifesto of the New Economy: Institutions and Business Models of the Digital Society. Springer. ISBN 978-3-642-21277-2.
- Pragmatics of culture, Moscow: Foundation for Scientific Research "Pragmatics of Culture", 2002
- Dolgin, Alexander (2009). "Adverse Selection in the Culture Industries". The Economics of Symbolic Exchange. Berlin, Heidelberg: Springer Berlin Heidelberg. pp. 69–144. doi:10.1007/978-3-540-79883-5_2. ISBN 978-3-540-79882-8.
- "Is a market possible without copyright?" Moscow: PIK Center, 2007
- "How can we become negotiable or a practical guide to collective action: the beginnings of the economic theory of clubs", Moscow: United Humanitarian Publishing House, 2013.
