= Layne Redmond =

American drummer

- Born: August 19, 1952; Florida, United States
- Died: October 28, 2013 (aged 61) North Carolina, United States
- Occupations: Drummer, writer, teacher
- Instrument: Frame drum
- Website: www.layneredmond.com

Layne Redmond (August 19, 1952 – October 28, 2013) was an American drummer, frame drum expert, writer, teacher, historian, and mythologist.

Drum maker Remo created a frame drum designed by Redmond as their first Signature Series product.

The February 2000 issue of Drum! listed Redmond as one of the 53 Heavyweight Drummers Who Made A Difference in the 1990s, where she is ranked among such musicians as Tony Williams, Roy Haynes, Zakir Hussain, Elvin Jones and Mickey Hart. She is the only woman on this list, and she is the only drummer on the list whose work focuses on the spiritual and healing dimensions of drumming and rhythm. Redmond's path focuses on the hand-held frame drum, the world's oldest known drum. For fifteen years, she researched the history of this drum in religious and healing rites in the ancient Mediterranean world culminating in her 1997 book, When the Drummers Were Women. The book details a lost history of a time when women were the primary percussionists in the ancient world and also explains why they are not today.

== Recordings ==
Redmond's recordings include The Wave of Bliss, Invoking the Muse, Trance Union, Since the Beginning and she has two instructional videos: Rhythmic Wisdom and A Sense of Time. Her meditation albums include: Chakra Breathing Meditation, Chanting the Chakras, Heart Chakra Meditations. She also authored a chakra meditation guide titled Chakra Meditation. She recorded under the Sounds True label.

== Death ==
In the summer of 2013, Redmond entered a hospice. Redmond died October 28, 2013, aged 61.

== Works ==
- Redmond, Layne (1997). When the Drummers Were Women: a Spiritual History of Rhythm. Three Rivers Press. ISBN 978-0-609-80128-4.
