= Dmitri Pokrovsky =

Russian musician (1944–1996)

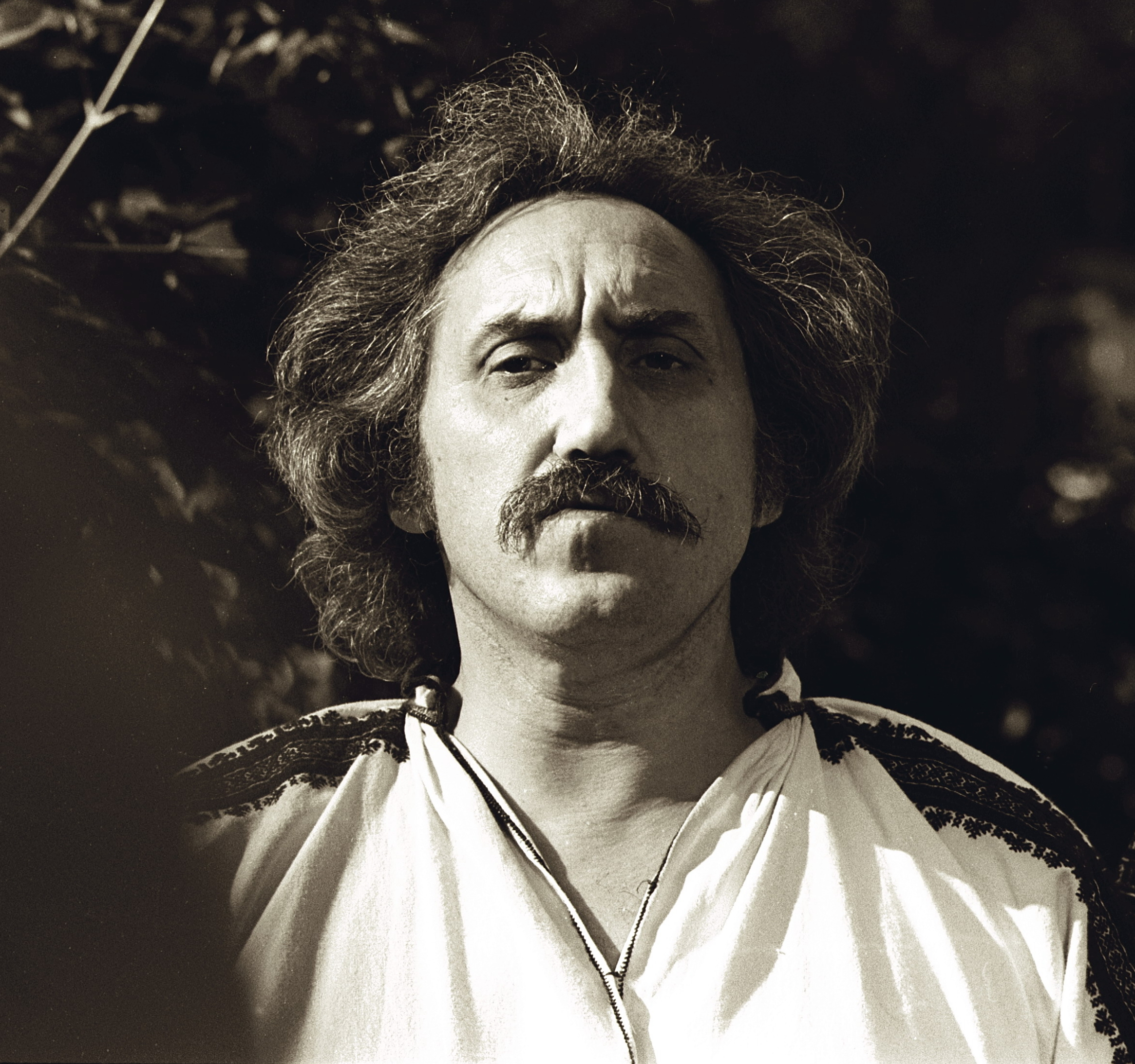
Dmitri Pokrovsky

Dmitri Viktorovich Pokrovsky (Russian: Дмитрий Викторович Покровский, 3 May 1944 – 29 June 1996) was a Russian folk music researcher and musician, best known for his efforts to rediscover authentic, and often near extinct rural musical traditions, from various regions of Russia, and re-enacting them with the Dmitri Pokrovsky Ensemble.
