= Russ Landau =

American composer of film and television scores and themes

- Landau in 2005

Background information
- Genres: Television; film score; new‑age; world music
- Occupations: Composer; musician
- Instruments: Bass guitar; guitar
- Formerly of: Paul Winter Consort
- Awards: Primetime Emmy Award (2008)

Russ Landau is an American composer and musician best known for his work in television, including the theme music for the reality series Survivor. His career includes a Primetime Emmy Award, multiple Emmy nominations, over 40 ASCAP Film & Television Music Awards, and a Grammy nomination from his time with the Paul Winter Consort.

== Early life and education ==
Landau earned a bachelor's degree in music from the University of Bridgeport and was awarded an honorary doctorate by the university in 2010.

== Career ==
Landau began his musical career as bassist and contributing composer with the Paul Winter Consort, working on world-fusion and environmental music that led to a Grammy nomination. In television, he received his first Primetime Emmy nomination in 1996 for the title theme of seaQuest DSV and another in 2001 for the Survivor series theme "Ancient Voices".

Landau's work on Survivor became iconic; he composed for over 580 episodes from 2000–2022, and his theme and underscore music became integral to the show's atmosphere.

In 2008, he won the Primetime Emmy Award for Outstanding Main Title Theme Music for Pirate Master. His notable credits also include composing music for Fear Factor, Average Joe, Combat Missions, Eco‑Challenge Borneo, The Net, and other reality and competition shows.

He explored field recording and indigenous sound on assignments like Survivor: China, traveling in Mainland China to source traditional music for use in the score.

== Select discography ==
=== Television soundtracks ===
- Survivor theme titled "Ancient Voices" and season underscore across more than 25 seasons (Vanuatu, Palau, Guatemala, China, Micronesia, Gabon, Tocantins, Samoa, Heroes vs. Villains, Redemption Island, Philippines, Caramoan, etc.)
  - Landau also produced an alternative theme for Survivor, titled “Awakenings”. This theme is used by many international editions of the series.
- Pirate Master
- Fear Factor
- Average Joe (Vol. 1 & 2)
- The Net (TV series)
- Eco‑Challenge Borneo
- Combat Missions
- Three Wishes
- ...plus various solo music compilations

=== Selected collaborations ===
- With Paul Winter Consort: Solstice Live!, Earthbeat, Concert for the Earth, The Man Who Planted Trees (Grammy‑nominated), Wintersong, Angel on a Stone Wall, Pianosong

== Awards and recognition ==
Landau's career is marked by multiple top industry honors:

- Primetime Emmy Award – *Outstanding Main Title Theme Music*, Pirate Master (2008)
- Primetime Emmy nominations – seaQuest DSV (1996), Survivor theme (2001)
- Grammy nomination – as part of Paul Winter Consort
- Over 40 ASCAP Film & Television Music Awards
- Honorary Doctorate, University of Bridgeport (2010)

== Cultural impact ==
Landau's Survivor themes have evolved into a cult phenomenon. The fan community recreates the music online—often calling it the emotional core of the show's experience, likening it to revered instrumental compositions from classical or video game genres.

Landau noted: "Music helps tell the story, music helps indicate what the people on the island are feeling."

== Personal life ==
Landau is a licensed pilot living in Topanga, California.
