= Spanish Angel (album) =

Live album by Paul Winter Consort
- Released: 1993
- Genre: New-age
- Label: Living Music

Professional ratings
Review scores
Source	Rating
Allmusic	3/5 stars

Spanish Angel is a live album by Paul Winter Consort, released in 1993 through the record label Living Music. In 1994, the album earned the group a Grammy Award for Best New Age Album.

== Track listing ==
1. "Fare Well" (Halley) – 7:02
2. "Spanish Angel" (Friesen) – 6:48
3. "Suite from the Man Who Planted Trees: Ballad of the Forest/The Planter" (Halley) – 5:36
4. "Oak Theme/Todo Mundo" (Halley) – 6:27
5. "Winter's Dream" (Halley) – 4:53
6. "River Run" (Castro-Neves, Friesen, Halley, Velez, Winter) – 5:59
7. "Almería Duet" (Friesen, Halley) – 8:25
8. "Montana" (Halley) – 4:19
9. "Music for a Sunday Night in Salamanca" (Friesen, Halley, Larson, Velez, Wadopian, Winter) – 8:49
10. "Appalachian Morning" (Halley) – 4:54
11. "Dancing Particles" (Halley, Velez, Winter) – 5:01
12. "Blues for Cádiz" (Friesen, Halley, Larson, Velez) – 1:50

== Personnel ==
- Paul Winter — soprano saxophone
- Rhonda Larson — flute
- Paul Halley — piano
- Eugene Friesen — cello
- Eliot Wadopian — bass
- Glen Velez — percussion
