= Glen Velez =

- Born: Dallas, Texas, U.S.
- Genres: Jazz; classical; Latin, world fusion
- Occupation: Musician
- Instruments: Frame drum; percussion
- Years active: 1973–present
- Labels: CMP
- Website: glenvelez.com

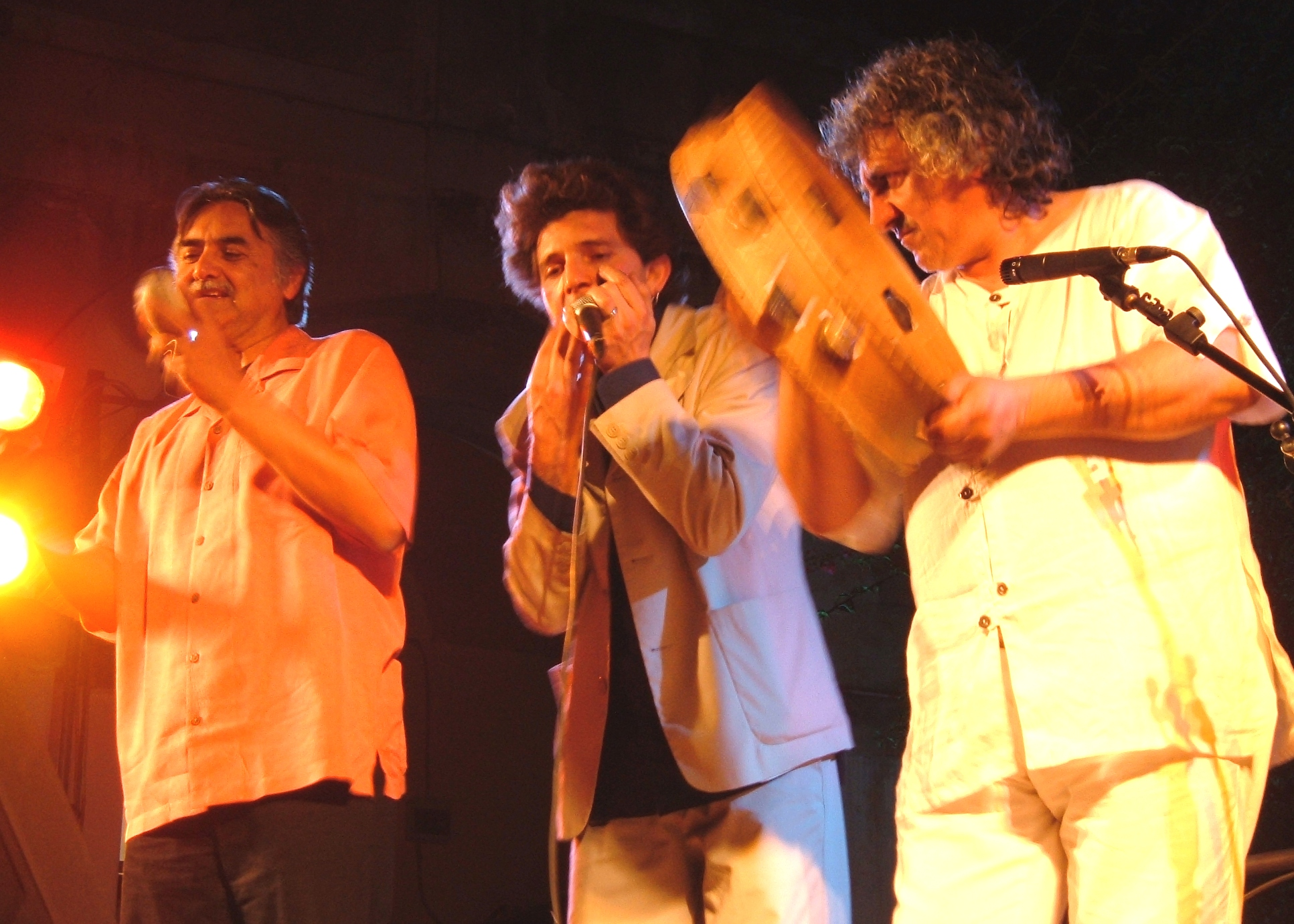
Glen Velez, Luca Recupero, and Alfio Antico at the Marranzano World Festival of Catania, Sicily, 2007

Glen Velez (born 1949) is a four-time Grammy winning American percussionist, vocalist, and composer, specializing in frame drums from around the world. He is largely responsible for the increasing popularity of frame drums in the United States and around the world. Velez is married to Loire.

== Biography ==
Of Mexican American ancestry, Velez was born in Dallas and grew up in Texas but moved to New York City in 1967. He began by playing jazz on the drums but soon gravitated to hand drums from around the world (frame drums in particular), seeking out teachers from many different musical traditions. Among the many instruments Velez favors are the Irish bodhrán, the Brazilian pandeiro, the Arabic riq, the North African bendir, and the Azerbaijani ghaval. Although these instruments are similar in construction, they have their own playing techniques. Velez has studied each instrument traditionally, but he has also developed his own cross-cultural musical vocabulary, mixing and adapting techniques from various cultures and developing new ones (such as playing the bodhrán with brushes). He has been influential in the growing international interest in frame drums, and many younger players now use his techniques. He teaches percussion and frame drums at Mannes College of Music and The Juilliard School.

He also plays other percussion instruments such as the Venezuelan maracas and steel drum, and is skilled at overtone singing and Konnakol.

Velez's compositions are frequently composed for cross-cultural ensembles in which he himself also performs; he is particularly fond of polyrhythm—superimposing different meters simultaneously.

Velez was a longtime member of the Paul Winter Consort and Steve Reich and Musicians. He has also worked with Layne Redmond, Howard Levy, Steve Gorn, Rabih Abou-Khalil, Pat Metheny, Lyle Mays, Marc Cohn, Suzanne Vega, Glen Moore, Malcolm Dalglish, and Jonas Hellborg .

Velez's students include Layne Redmond and Yousif Sheronick.

== Discography ==
=== As leader ===
- 1984 Handdance: Frame Drum Music (Nomad)
- 1985 Internal Combustion (CMP)
- 1985 Radio Iceland (Music of the World)
- 1987 Seven Heaven (CMP)
- 1989 Assyrian Rose (CMP)
- 1990 Ramana (Music of the World)
- 1992 Nafas (ECM)
- 1993 Songs of Kabir (Interworld)
- 1994 Border States (Interworld)
- 1994 Doctrine of Signatures (CMP)
- 1994 Ettna (Nomad)
- 1994 Pan Eros (CMP)
- 1994 Temurá (Nuba)
- 1996 Rhythmcolor Exotica (Ellipsis Arts)
- 1998 Rhythms of the Chakras (Sounds True)
- 2000 Breathing Rhythms (Sounds True)
- 2000 Kinship (Koch)
- 2005 Elephant Hotel
- 2005 Rhythms of Awakening
- 2008 Rhythms Of The Chakras Volume 2
- 2009 Glen Velez Solo
- 2019 Sweet Season ERC 078

=== As sideman ===
With Steve Reich

- 1978 Steve Reich: Music for 18 Musicians
- 1980 Steve Reich: Octet; Music for a Large Ensemble; Violin Phase
- 1985 Steve Reich: The Desert Music Steve Reich/Michael Tilson Thomas
- 1986 Steve Reich: Sextet; Six Marimbas
- 1998 Music for 18 Musicians
- 2002 Steve Reich: Variations, Six Pianos Etc.
- 2003 Steve Reich: Drumming

With Paul Winter

- 1983 Sun Singer
- 1985 Canyon Consort
- 1985 Canyon
- 1985 Concert for the Earth
- 1987 Earthbeat
- 1990 Earth: Voices of a Planet
- 1992 Anthems
- 1994 Prayer for the Wild Things
- 1995 Man Who Planted Trees
- 1993 Solstice Live!
- 1993 Spanish Angel (Recorded Live in Spain)
- 2005 Silver Solstice
- 2007 Crestone

With Malcolm Dalglish

- 1991 Dalglish: Hymnody of Earth
- 1997 Pleasure
- 2003 Carpe Diem! A Ceremony of Song

With Peter Kater

- 1991 Homage
- 1999 Birds of Prey
- 2013 Heart of the Universe

With Paul Sullivan

- 1987 Sketches of Maine
- 1988 A Visit to the Rockies
- 1992 Christmas in Maine

With Marc Cohn

- 1991 Marc Cohn
- 1993 The Rainy Season

With David Lanz

- 1998 Songs from an English Garden
- 2005 Spirit Romance

With Patty Larkin

- 1993 Angels Running
- 1995 Strangers World

With Rabih Abou-Khalil

- 1988 Nafas (ECM)
- 1994 Between Dusk and Dawn
- 1994 Bukra
- 1994 Roots & Sprouts

With Orquesta de las Nubes, Miguel Herrero and Layne Redmond

- 1985 Música Esporádica

With others

- 1987 New York Counterpoint, Richard Stoltzman
- 1988 Basic Tendencies, Mike Richmond
- 1988 Memos from Paradise, Eddie Daniels
- 1988 Street Dreams, Lyle Mays
- 1989 Arms Around You, Eugene Friesen
- 1990 Days of Open Hand, Suzanne Vega
- 1990 Strange Omen, Michael Cain
- 1991 Angel on a Stone Wall, Paul Halley
- 1994 Ettna, Enzo Rao
- 1995 Ars Moriende, Jonas Hellborg
- 1994 Rhymes With Orange, Mario Grigorov
- 1994 Trio Globo, Trio Globo
- 1995 Carnival of Souls, Trio Globo
- 1995 On the Cliffs of the Heart, David Rothenberg
- 1995 Power Lines, Ned Rothenberg
- 1995 Istanpitta, Vol. 1: A Medieval Dance Band, New York Ensemble for Early Music
- 1996 Istanpitta, Vol. 2: Medieval Dances, New York Ensemble for Early Music
- 1996 Celtic Soul, Nóirín Ní Riain
- 1996 Song of the Irish Whistle, Joanie Madden
- 1996 Closer to Far Away, Douglas Spotted Eagle
- 1996 Layers of Time, Reinhard Flatischler
- 1996 Little Magic in a Noisy World, Nguyên Lê
- 1997 Clara Ponty, Clara Ponty
- 1997 End of the Summer, Dar Williams
- 1997 Imaginary Day, Pat Metheny
- 1997 One in the Pocket, Badal Roy
- 1998 Sea of Dreams, Davy Spillane
- 1998 Shy Angels, Sussan Deyhim
- 2000 Madman of God, Sussan Deyhim
- 2000 Tarantata: Dance of the Ancient Spider, Alessandra Belloni
- 2002 Gypsy Killer, Sanda Weigl
- 2007 Celtic Grace, Aureole Trio
- 2014 Españoletas, Harmonious Blacksmith
- 2015 Amaryllis, Nina Stern

== Video ==
- Canyon Consort, Paul Winter (A&M/Windham Hill Video, 1985)
- Ancient Altars, New Forms, Marion Scott & Rene Olivas Gubernick (New York Public Library Dance Collection, 1986)
- World Drums, Niv Fichman (director) (National Film Board of Canada, 1986)
- C.O.C.A., Manuel Alum Dance Company soundtrack compilation (New York Public Library Dance Collection, 1988)
- Drumbeats Glen Velez (REMO, 1989)
- The Fantastic World of Frame Drums, Glen Velez (Interworld, 1990)
- Mountain Gorilla (IMAX film, 1992), Various Artists
- Noah and the Ark: The Classic Story of Noah's Ark, Paul Winter (Rabbit Ears Productions, 1992)
- Hymnody of Earth (revised), Malcolm Dalglish (KET, 1993)
- Back to Nature – Live in Zagreb, Paul Winter (Croatian TV, 1994)
- The Snowbird Cherokees Richard Panter, (producer) soundtrack compilation (South Carolina, 1995)
- Handance Method 1, Glen Velez (Interworld/Warner Bros., 1996)
- Handance Method 2, Glen Velez (Interworld/Warner Bros., 1996)
- The Selchie and the Fisherman, Malcolm Dalglish (Live Multimedia, 1997)
- Modern Drummer Festival Weekend, Various Artists (Warner Bros., 1998)
- Wendigo, Larry Fessenden (director) soundtrack (Magnolia Pictures, 2003)

== Published scores ==
- "Composed Improvisation for One-sided Drum with or without Jangles," for Glen Velez, composed by John Cage, New York Public Library Music Division Research Collection, c. early 1980s.
- "Hymnody of Earth: A Celebration of Songs for Choir, Hammer Dulcimer, and Percussion" (Revised) composed and arranged by Malcolm Dalglish, poetry by Wendell Berry, percussion parts by Glen Velez. Published in Ft. Lauderdale by Plymouth Music Co., MDP-900, 1995.

== Articles/interviews/books ==
- Berendt, Joachim E. and Gunther Huesmann. The Jazz Book: From Ragtime to Fusion to Beyond. Brooklyn: Lawrence Hill Books, 1992, 6th edition, 358.
- Blank-Edelman, David N. "Glen Velez: A Unified Approach to the Frame Drum." RhythmMusic Magazine 3, no. 8 (1994): 38-43.
- ________. "Glen Velez: From South India to Azerbaijan, Velez Finds a Unified Approach to the Frame Drum." Percussion Source 1, no. 1 (1995): 10-12.
- Brooks, Iris. "Global Beat: World Drum Festival." Ear: Magazine of New Music 2, no. 3 (November 1986): 8.
- ________. "The World Drum Festival." Modern Percussionist 3, no. 1 (December/February 1986/1987): 14-17, 37, 39.
- ________. "Meet the Composer: Glen Velez." Ear: Magazine of New Music 12, no. 6 (1987): 16-19.
- ________. "Around the World: Glen Velez." Modern Drummer 11, no. 9 (September 1988): 76-79.
- ________. "Glen Velez: Hands Dancing." Jazziz 8 (August 1995): 60, 61, 63, 65, 67.
- ________. "Colors & Scents: Glen Velez Draws Inspiration From the World Around Him." Drum! 6, no. 1 (1997): 75-78.
- ________. "Glen Velez: Embodies the Essence of Rhythm." Drum! 10, no. 2 (March/April 2001): 67-68, 70, 72, 74, 76, 132.
- Browning, Robert (editor). "Kavkazi," in Maqam: Music of the Islamic World and its Influences. New York: Alternative Museum, 1984, 40.
- Dalglish, Malcolm with Glen Velez. Hymnody of Earth: A Ceremony of Songs for Choir, Hammer Dulcimer and Percussion [revised]. Ft. Lauderdale: Plymouth Music, 1995.
- Dorsey, Ed. "Ethnic Percussion: An Interview with Glen Velez." Percussive Notes 25, no. 4 (Spring 1987): 56-60.
- Dorsey, Ed, Iris Brooks and Antonio Gentile. "Glen Velez." Percussioni 7, no. 60 (January 1996): 12-16.
- Graham, Richard. "Glen Velez's Tambourines." Modern Percussionist 2, no. 1 (December/February 1985/1986): 48-50.
- Johnson, Tom. "Music: The Real Tambourine Man." The Village Voice 26 (11 March 1981): 70.
- ________. The Voice of New Music: New York City, 1972-1982: A Collection of Articles Originally Published in The Village Voice. Eindholen: Apollohuis, 1989, 469-472.
- Kwan-uk, Hyun (photographer). "Expo '93: The Culture of Science, The Science of Culture."
- Koreana: Korean Art and Culture (Summer 1993): 40-41 (appears in photo only – International Drum Festival 1993).
- Li Castro, Emiliano and Fabrizio Dadò. "I tamburi a cornice di Glen Velez." Percussioni 2, no. 6 (February 1991): 36-39.
- Lieberman, Julie Lyonn. Planet Musician: The World Music Sourcebook for Musicians. Milwaukee: Hal Leonard, 1998, 6, 68.
- Liss, Dan. "Music: Framing a New Sound." Aquarius 4, no. 12 (1997): 14.
- ________. "New Perspectives in Rhythms: An Interview with Glen Velez." New Age Voice 4, no. 7 (August 1998): 16, 18.
- Moscov, Josh. "Glen Velez: Exploring Where East Meets West." Drum! 1, no. 6 (July/August 1992): 25-27.
- Robinson, N. Scott. "Glen Velez: World Music Total." Batera & Percussão 3, no. 28 (December 1999): 30-32.
- ________. "Glen Velez: A World of Sound in His Hands." Modern Drummer 24, no. 4 (April 2000): 72-76, 78-80, 82, 84, 86.
- ________. The New Percussionist in Jazz: Organological and Technical Expansion. Masters Thesis, Kent State University, 2002.
- ________. "Frame Drums and Tambourines," in Continuum Encyclopedia of Popular Music of the World, Volume Two: Performance and Production. Edited by John Shepherd, David Horn, Dave Laing, Paul Oliver, and Peter Wicke. New York: Continuum, 2003, 362-372.
- ________. “Performing the Past, Present and Beyond: Glen Velez and Researching Frame Drum History.” Percussive Notes 51, no. 4 (July 2013): 30-34.
- Schaefer, John. New Sounds: A Listener's Guide to World Music. New York: Harper & Row, 1987, 130, 132.
- Sofia, Sal. "The World Drum Festival." Percussioner International 2, no. 1 (1987): 66-72.
- Solca, Alex. "Highlights of Modern Drummer's 1998 Festival Weekend." Modern Drummer 22, no. 10 (1998): 110-111.
- Tolleson, Robin. "Riffs: Glen Velez." DownBeat 58 (November 1991): 14.
- Velez, Glen. "The Tambourine in Ancient Western Asia." Ear Magazine East 5, no. 5 (April/May 1980): 3.
- ________. "A Monograph on the Frame Drum, Ancestor of our Modern Tambourine." Ear Magazine East 7, no. 3/4 (April/October 1982): 8-9.
- ________. Handance Duets for Frame Drums. New York: Framedrum Music, 2001.
- ________. Handance Method with Cueing and Performance Guide: An Introduction to Frame Drumming. New York: Framedrum Music, 2002.
- ________. Bodhran Instruction Manual. New York: Frame Drum Music, 2004.
- ________. Shakers Instruction Manual. New York: Frame Drum Music, 2004.
- ________. Tar Instruction Manual. New York: Frame Drum Music, 2004.
- Wentz, Brooke. "An Interview With Glen Velez." Op Magazine V (1984): 42-43.
