= Paul Winter =

American saxophonist, composer, and bandleader (b. 1939)

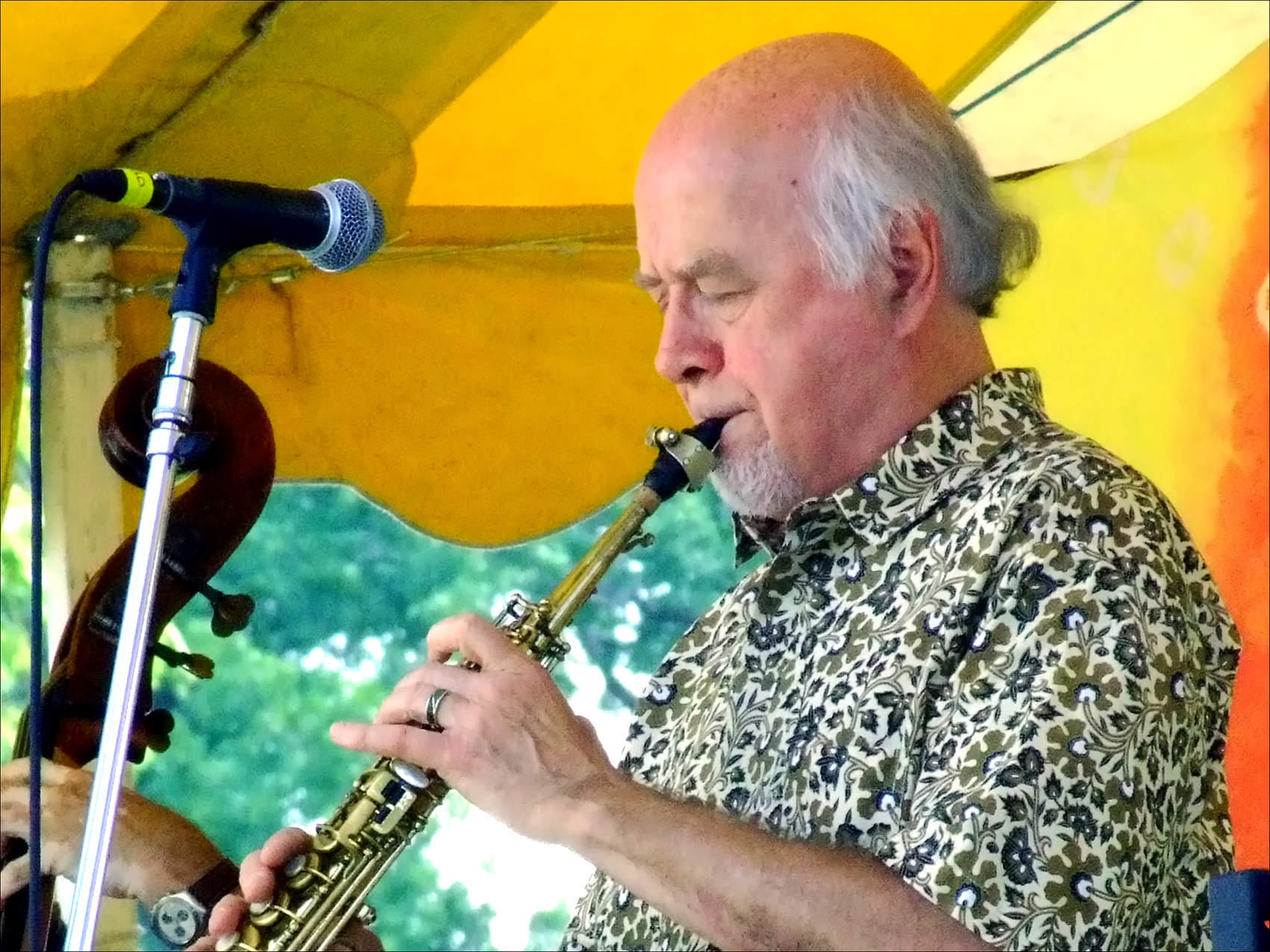
- Clearwater Festival, 2007

Background information
- Born: August 31, 1939 (age 86); Altoona, Pennsylvania, U.S.
- Genres: Jazz, new-age, world music
- Occupation: Musician
- Instrument: Saxophone
- Years active: 1961–present
- Labels: Columbia, A&M, Epic, Living Music
- Website: www.paulwinter.com

Paul Winter (born August 31, 1939) is an American saxophonist, composer, and bandleader. He is considered to be a pioneer of world music, which interweaves the voices of the wild with instrumental voices from classical, jazz, and world music. The music is often improvised and recorded in nature to reflect the qualities brought into play by the environment.

== Early life ==
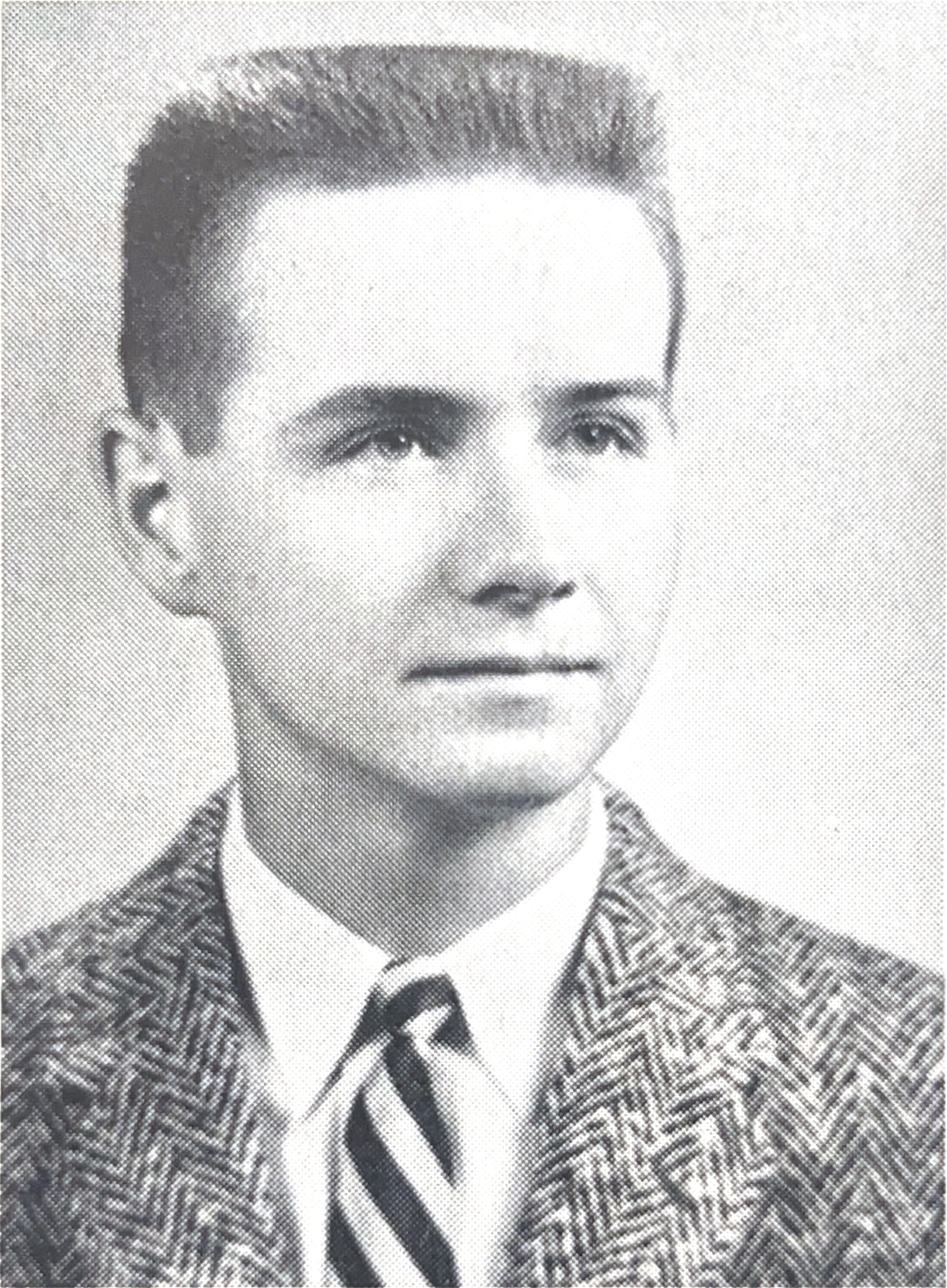
Winter in the 1957 Altoona Area High School yearbook

Winter was born in Altoona, Pennsylvania, United States. He studied piano and clarinet, then fell in love with saxophone in the fourth grade. He started the Little German Band with his schoolmates when he was twelve, then a Dixieland band, and a nine-piece dance band known as The Silver Liners. He became enthralled by big bands and bebop bands of the 1950s. After graduating from Altoona Area High School in 1957, he spent the summer on a tour of state fairs in the Midwest with the conductor and members of the Ringling Brothers Circus Band.

== Paul Winter Sextet ==
At Northwestern University, he majored in English and visited jazz clubs in Chicago. In 1961, his sextet won the Intercollegiate Jazz Festival and was signed by Columbia Records. He was accepted by the University of Virginia Law School, but postponed that plan when during the next year the sextet went on a goodwill tour of Latin America, as cultural ambassadors for the United States State Department, playing 160 concerts in 23 countries. First Lady Jacqueline Kennedy invited the band to perform at the White House. The performance in the East Room on November 19, 1962, was the first jazz concert in the White House. In the mid-1960s, Winter lived for a year in Brazil. It became a second home for him and he recorded several albums there. Rio was released in 1965 with liner notes by Vinicius de Moraes.

== Paul Winter Consort ==
In 1967 he started the Paul Winter Consort, influenced by Heitor Villa-Lobos and other Brazilian music, to give ensemble playing and soloing equal importance, analogous to a democracy where every voice would count. He borrowed the name from English Elizabethan theater of the 16th and 17th centuries, when bands combined woodwinds, strings, and percussion, the same families of instruments he wanted to combine in his contemporary consort. With this group, he became one of the earliest creators of world music.

Recordings of humpback whales in 1968 influenced his music, and his desire to become an environment activist. In 1977, his album Common Ground was his first to incorporate sounds of whales, eagles, and wolves into his music. The Paul Winter Consort recorded during the 1960s and 1970s. Four albums for A&M were produced by Phil Ramone and Paul Stookey. Astronauts of Apollo 15 took the Consort's album Road to the moon with them and named two craters after the songs "Ghost Beads" and "Icarus". George Martin produced the album Icarus and considered it one of the best he produced. The band Oregon was formed by band members who worked on this album: Ralph Towner, Paul McCandless, and Collin Walcott, and Glen Moore, who had played on the "Road" album but left the Consort before "Icarus" was recorded.

In the early 1980s, Winter began traveling to the Soviet Union. In 1984, he ventured as far as Lake Baikal in Siberia, and found it so beautiful that he returned to try to protect it. In 1984, he became friends with Yevgeny Yevtushenko. Winter took part in the U.S.–Soviet Space Bridge to encourage collaboration between Russians and Americans. On a tour of the Soviet Union in 1986, the Consort performed with the Dmitri Pokrovsky Ensemble at Moscow University. During the next year the two bands recorded the album EarthBeat in Moscow and New York. It was the first album of music created together by Americans and Russians.

In 1980, Winter founded Living Music Records as a forum for his musical and ecological vision. The name alludes to his desire to make timeless music in natural acoustic spaces like stone churches, canyons, and barns.

== Artist-in-residence ==
Winter is a member of the Lindisfarne Association, founded by William Irwin Thompson, of scientists, artists, scholars, and contemplatives devoted to the study and realization of a planetary culture. Through this organization, Winter met the Very Reverend James Parks Morton, Dean of New York City's Cathedral of St. John the Divine. In 1980, Dean Morton invited him to become artist-in-residence there, to build bridges between spirituality and the environment with his music. St. John the Divine Cathedral is the largest gothic cathedral in the world and known as "the green cathedral." In the 1980s and 1990s, it became the center of a vital community of thinkers and seekers working on issues of ecology and environment and world peace. Cosmologist Father Thomas Berry influenced Winter and affirmed his intent to awaken in people a sense of community.

Since 1980, Winter and the Paul Winter Consort have presented over 100 events at the cathedral, including "Tao of Bach" with Al Huang, Carnival for the Rainforest, and with tightrope walker Philippe Petit. Every year on the feast day of Saint Francis of Assisi a choir of hundreds of voices, gospel singer Theresa Thomason, and the Forces of Nature Dance Theatre join the Consort in a liturgical performance of Winter's ecological and ecumenical Missa Gaia (Earth Mass). The major movements of the mass are based on the voices of whale, harp seal, and wolf.

== Earth music ==
In 1968, when he attended a lecture on whale songs by Roger Payne at Rockefeller University in New York City, Payne and Scott McVay discovered that humpbacks produce sounds in intricate patterns that fit the definition of "songs." These change over time and represent a cultural tradition passed orally from one whale to the next. Winter was thrilled by the soulful beauty of these humpback whale voices, in much the same way as when he had first heard jazz saxophonists like Charlie Parker. Listening to the whale songs on repeat, he was amazed by their musical intelligence, and shocked to learn that these creatures were rapidly being hunted to extinction. They opened the door to the whole symphony of nature and changed the direction of Winter's musical life.

Another milestone was hearing Roger Payne's 1970 album Songs of the Humpback Whale, which popularized the whale songs.

During the 1970s, Winter became involved in the movement to bring awareness of whales and their extraordinary music to the world. In late 1976, Governor Jerry Brown declared Whale Day" in California. He convened a three-day whale conference in Sacramento, bringing together biologists such as John Lilly; filmmakers; environmentalists; poets, including Gary Snyder; musicians such as Joni Mitchell and the Paul Winter Consort; and fans of the whales. During the early 1970s, as whale consciousness emerged in the culture, Japan began to come under widespread criticism for its continued whaling operations. From the Sacramento whale conference came the idea that, rather than boycott Japan, efforts should be made to communicate with Japanese environmentalists and share with them the growing body of information about whales and why they should be protected. During the following April, this resulted in a large contingent of biologists and musicians (including the Paul Winter Consort, Mimi Fariña, Jackson Browne, and the fusion band, Stuff, featuring Steve Gadd), along with Governor Brown, traveling to Tokyo for a week of performances. Called "Japan Celebrates the Whale and Dolphin," it was reportedly the first environmental event ever held in Japan.

Winter traveled to Japan several times with the "Save the Whales" campaign; played benefits for Greenpeace and other organizations; and led music-making and whale-watching workshops on Cape Cod and in Baja California. In 1975, Winter sailed aboard the Greenpeace V anti-whaling expedition for three days of playing saxophone to wild gray whales off the coast of Vancouver Island (Tofino). He was accompanied in this effort by Melville Gregory and Will Jackson, musicians attempting to "communicate" with the whales using various instruments and a Serge synthesizer. Photos of Winter and the whales [by Rex Weyler] appeared on wire services and in media around the world, helping the ultimate success of the mission against Soviet whalers.

In 1978, Winter released Common Ground, an album that combined his music and animal sounds (wolves, eagles, and whales). In 1980, a chance encounter with a wild sea lion pup off Baja California affected Winter deeply, and inspired him to explore the realm of pinnipeds and the role of sound in their lives, in the same way he had immersed himself in learning about whales and wolves. He spent three years observing, listening to, and occasionally playing his saxophone to sea mammals. His research expeditions took him to Newfoundland, British Columbia, Scotland's Inner Hebrides, the California coastal islands, San Salvador in the Bahamas, and twice again to Magdalena Island in Baja California. The resulting album, Callings, helped initiate a successful campaign to have Congress designate March 1 each year as "The Day of the Seal."

A further collaboration with Dr. Roger Payne resulted in the album Whales Alive!, with actor Leonard Nimoy, It realized a long-standing dream shared by Payne and Winter to create an entire album of music based on melodies by whales. The album intersperses readings of prose and poetry about whales with music improvised in response to recordings of the whale voices, extending the whale melodies in a way similar to how the whales themselves gradually change and grow their long, complex songs.

In 1990, Winter convinced Roger Payne to come to Japan to various whaling cities, including Shoji and Ogasawara to tour a joint program showing how whale watching could be a viable business alternative to whale-killing.

== Winter and wolves ==
In late 1968, Winter saw wolves for the first time in the Redding, Connecticut, middle school, at a program given by John Harris. Harris was touring the country to raise awareness about wolves and trying to counter the prejudice that was responsible for the extermination of these creatures from the wild. Looking into the eyes of the wolf as it sat in the back of Harris' van after the program, Winter was inspired to write his piece "Wolf Eyes." It presented the lyrical voice of the wolf, and a different, gentle, image of a creature so long misunderstood and vilified by humans.

In 1973, at a wildlife conference in St. Louis, Winter met wolf biologist Fred Harrington, who invited him to Minnesota, where Winter heard wolves in the wild for the first time. In the mid-1970s, at a wolf preserve in the mountains of California, a captive wolf named Ida howled a duet with Winter's soprano sax, and her voice was featured on the Common Ground album, Winter's first musical statement about the entire family of life, and the first album to feature voices of endangered species – symbolically representing with whale, wolf, and eagle the realms of sea, land, and air.

After the Redding program, Winter visited John Harris many times, and Harris and the wolves sometimes stayed on Winter's farm. During the 1978 Common Ground tour, Winter invited Harris to introduce his wolf on stage, including on September 8, 1978, at a benefit for the Audubon Society at Carnegie Hall, after which the wolf was featured on the front page of The New York Times.

== Adventures in SoundPlay ==
In 1968, Winter began introducing improvisations into the Consort's concerts as a way for the group (cello, alto flute, English horn and sax) to play freely. The band would perform one "free piece" with all the lights turned out in every concert. This shared adventure into the unknown was often a high point with audiences. After the Consort was asked to do a residency of "master classes" at the Hartt School of Music in 1971, Winter began developing a process for unlocking the unique music inside each person, by creating safe, fun contexts for free interplay. He calls his workshops "Adventures in SoundPlay" No "wrong notes", no worship of virtuosity, the dissolving of fears – all these things served to open new paths. Winter has conducted about 300 of these sessions at music schools, universities, and at centers such as Esalen, Kripalu, Rowe, and Omega.

== Awards ==
Winter has received a Global 500 Award from the United Nations, the Joseph Wood Krutch Medal from the United States Humane Society, the Peace Abbey's Courage of Conscience Award, the Spirit of the City Award presented at New York's Cathedral of St John the Divine, and an honorary Doctorate of Music from the University of Hartford. He also received the James Parks Morton Interfaith Award. Paul Winter received 6 Grammy Awards and 13 Grammy nominations between 1986 and 2010. Spanish Angel earned Winter his first Grammy Award in 1993 for Best New Age Album. His other Grammy wins were for the albums Prayer for the Wild Things (2005), Celtic Solstice (1999), Silver Solstice (2005), Crestone (2007), and Miho: Journey to the Mountain (2010).

== Discography ==
=== Solo ===
Title	Year	Label
Jazz Meets the Bossa Nova	1962	Columbia
The Sound of Ipanema	1964	Columbia
Rio	1965	Columbia
Common Ground	1978	A&M
Callings	1980	Living Music
Missa Gaia/Earth Mass	1982	Living Music
Sun Singer	1983	Living Music
Canyon	1985	Living Music
Wintersong	1986	Living Music
Whales Alive	1987	Living Music
Earthbeat	1987	Living Music
Earth: Voices of a Planet	1990	Living Music
Solstice Live!	1993	Living Music
Prayer for the Wild Things	1994	Living Music
Canyon Lullaby	1997	Living Music
Brazilian Days	1998	Living Music
Celtic Solstice	1999	Living Music
Journey with the Sun	2000	Living Music

=== Paul Winter Consort ===
Title	Year	Label
The Winter Consort	1968	A&M
Something in the Wind	1969	A&M
Road	1970	A&M
Icarus	1972	Epic
Earthdance	1977	A&M
Concert for the Earth	1985	Living Music
Wolf Eyes (compilation)	1989	Living Music
The Man Who Planted Trees	1990	Living Music
Turtle Island	1991	Living Music
Spanish Angel	1993	Living Music
Anthems (compilation)	1998	Living Music
Silver Solstice	2005	Living Music
Crestone	2007	Living Music
Miho: Journey to the Mountain	2010	Living Music
Earth Music	2011	Living Music

=== Paul Winter Sextet ===
Title	Year	Label
The Paul Winter Sextet	1961	Columbia
Jazz Meets the Bossa Nova	1962	Columbia
Jazz Premiere: Washington	1963	Columbia
New Jazz on Campus	1963	Columbia
Jazz Meets the Folk Song	1963	Columbia
Jazz Casual: Paul Winter/Bola Sete and Vince Guaraldi	2001	Koch Jazz
