= Eugene Friesen =

American cellist and composer (born 1952)

Eugene Friesen (born 1952) is an American cellist and composer.

== Early life ==
Friesen was born in 1952 to Russian Mennonite parents. He is a graduate of the Yale School of Music.

== Career ==
Friesen has been a member of the Paul Winter Consort since 1978, and performs with Howard Levy and Glen Velez as Trio Globo. He received a Grammy Award as a member of the Paul Winter Consort for the 1994 album Spanish Angel and again in 2006 for the Consort's Silver Solstice in 2007 for Crestone, and in 2011 for Miho: Journey to the Mountain. Friesen has won four Grammy Awards to date.

In 2012, Friesen's book, Improvisation for Classical Musicians was published by Berklee Press/Hal Leonard.

He teaches at the Berklee College of Music in Boston, Massachusetts and lives in Vermont. Among his prominent students are Rushad Eggleston, Mads Tolling, Lindsay Mac, and Nathan Leath. Friesen also runs a nonprofit production company, Sonoterra Productions, producing concerts, recordings and workshops.

== Discography ==
=== As leader ===
- New Friend with Paul Halley (Living Music, 1986)
- Arms Around You (Living Music, 1989)
- The Bremen Town Musicians (1993)
- Sono Miho (2004)

=== As sideman ===
With Scott Cossu

- Islands (Windham Hill, 1984)
- Reunion (Windham Hill, 1986)
- Switchback (Windham Hill, 1989)

With Aine Minogue

- Celtic Meditation Music (Sounds True, 2004)
- Celtic Lamentations (Sounds True, 2005)
- Celtic Pilgrimage (Sounds True, 2007)
- In the Name of Stillness (Little Miller 2017)

With Paul Winter

- Callings (Living Music, 1980)
- Missa GaiaEarth Mass (Living Music, 1982)
- Canyon (Living Music, 1985)
- Concert for the Earth (Living Music, 1985)
- Wintersong (Living Music, 1986)
- Whales Alive (Living Music, 1986)
- Earthbeat (Living Music, 1987)
- Wolf Eyes (Living Music, 1988)
- Earth: Voices of a Planet (Living Music, 1990)
- El Hombre Que Plantaba Arboles (Lyricon, 1993)
- Solstice Live! (Living Music, 1993)
- Spanish Angel (Living Music, 1993)
- Prayer for the Wild Things (Living Music, 1994)
- En Directo en Espana (Ediciones Resistencia 1996)
- Journey with the Sun (Living Music, 2000)
- Silver Solstice (Living Music, 2005)
- Crestone (Living Music, 2007)
- Miho: Journey to the Mountain (Living Music, 2010)

With others

- William Ackerman, Conferring with the Moon (Windham Hill, 1986)
- William Ackerman, Meditations (Lifescapes/Compass, 2008)
- Terry Bozzio, Prime Cuts from Terry Bozzio's Magna Carta Sessions (Magna Carta, 2005)
- Betty Buckley, With One Look (Sterling, 1994)
- Oscar Castro-Neves, Oscar! (Living Music, 1987)
- Lui Collins, Moondancer Molly (Gamblin Music, 1993)
- Anthony Davis, Hemispheres (Gramavision, 1983)
- Dream Theater, Train of Thought (Elektra, 2003)
- Flow, Flow (LMB Music, 2017)
- Charles Gross, Punchline (A&M, 1988)
- Paul Halley, Angel on a Stone Wall (Living Music, 1991)
- Phil Markowitz, Taxi Ride (Passage, 1998)
- Emi Meyer, Monochrome (Origin, 2017)
- Susan Osborn, Signature (Lifeline, 1983)
- Jeff Oster, True (Retso, 2007)
- Alice Parker, Heavenly Hurt: Poems by Emily Dickinson (Gothic 2017)
- Noirin Ni Riain, Celtic Soul (Living Music, 1996)
- Jordan Rudess, Feeding the Wheel (Magna Carta, 2001)
- Laura Sullivan, Love's River (Sentient Spirit, 2013)
- Toots Thielemans, The Brasil Project, Vol. 2 (Private Music, 1993)
- Arto Tuncboyaciyan, Every Day Is a New Life (Living Music, 2000)
- Glen Velez, Breathing Rhythms (Sounds True, 2000)
