= Paul Winter Consort =

American musical group

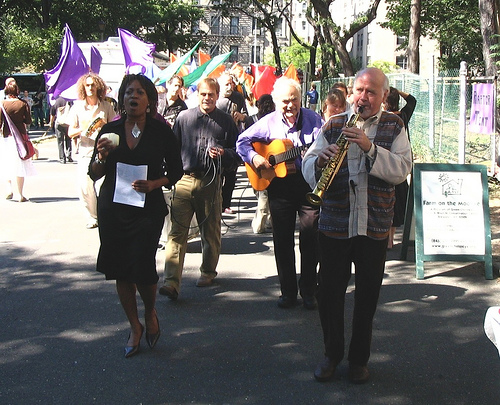
- The Paul Winter Consort outside the Cathedral of Saint John the Divine, Manhattan, after Earth Mass 2005

Background information
- Genres: New-age, chamber jazz, folk jazz, ethno jazz, world fusion
- Years active: 1967–present
- Labels: A&M, Epic, Living Music
- Members: Paul Winter; Eugene Friesen; Peter Slavov; Henrique Eisenman; Bertram Lehmann; Teresa Thomason
- Past members: John Beal; Ruth Ben-Zvi; Glen Velez; Gene Bertoncini; Richard Bock; Muruga Booker; Herb Bushler; Oscar Castro-Neves; David Darling; Guilherme Franco; Paul Halley; Karl Herreshoff; Gordon Johnson; Russ Landau; Jeff Holmes; Jamey Haddad; Paul McCandless; Cafe Da Silva; Satoshi Takeishi; Eliot Wadopian; Rhonda Larson; Glen Moore; Ted Moore; Gene Murrow; Susan Osborn; Dorothy Papadakos; Nancy Rumbel; Jim Saporito; Jim Scott; Virgil Scott; Paul Sullivan; Ralph Towner; Collin Walcott
- Website: www.livingmusic.com

The Paul Winter Consort is an American musical group. It has received four Grammy Awards, in 1994, 2006, 2008 and 2011.

== Discography ==
Title	Year	Label
The Winter Consort	1968	A&M
Something In The Wind	1969	A&M
Road	1970	A&M
Icarus	1972	Epic
Earthdance	1977	A&M
Concert for the Earth	1985	Living Music
Wolf Eyes:A Retrospective (compilation)	1989	Living Music
The Man Who Planted Trees	1990	Living Music
Turtle Island	1991	Living Music
Noah and the Ark	1992	Rabbit Ears Productions
Spanish Angel	1993	Living Music
Anthems:10 Years of Living Music (compilation)	1998	Living Music
Silver Solstice	2005	Living Music
Crestone	2007	Living Music
Miho: Journey to the Mountain	2010	Living Music
Earth Music	2011	Living Music

== Films ==
- Canyon Consort (1985)
