= Paul Halley =

English keyboardist, vocalist and composer

- Genres: Choral, new-age, gospel
- Occupation: Musician
- Instruments: Piano, organ, vocals, harpsichord, keyboards

Paul Halley (born 1952 in Romford, England) is a Grammy Award-winning composer, choral conductor, and organist. He is perhaps best known as being a member of and composer for the Paul Winter Consort. Halley is currently the Director of Music of The Cathedral Church of All Saints in Halifax.

== Biography ==
Paul Halley was born in Romford, England in 1952. His father was a musician, and when he emigrated with his family to Canada, he sang in the choir of St. Matthew's Church, Ottawa. Having been made an associate of The Royal Conservatory of Music in Toronto when he was 16, he went on to study music at Trinity College, Cambridge, where he was an organ scholar.

Following graduation, Halley became the organist and choir master of the Cathedral of St John the Divine in New York City. After leaving the Cathedral in 1989, Halley founded Joyful Noise, Inc., a non-profit organization, designed to teach children proper vocal technique, music theory, and musicianship. The two groups involved with the organization, Chorus Angelicus and Gaudeamus, are both still active.

From July 2007 to December 2021 Halley served as Director of Music at both the University of King's College and All Saints Cathedral in Halifax, Nova Scotia.

He is currently the director of music at the Cathedral Church of All Saints, Halifax.

== Discography ==
=== As a leader ===
- Nightwatch (1982)
- Pianosong (1986)
- New Friend (1986) with Eugene Friesen
- Whales Alive (1987) with Paul Winter and Leonard Nimoy
- Angel on a Stone Wall (1991)
- Voices of Light (1994)
- Christmas Angelicus (1995)
- Sound Over All Waters (1998) with Theresa Thomason
- Triptych (2000)
- Let Us Keep The Feast (2014)
- In the Wide Awe and Wisdom (2017)

=== As a guest ===
- Stranger to Stranger (2016)
