= Alya Michelson =

Russian-born philanthropist, songwriter and singer

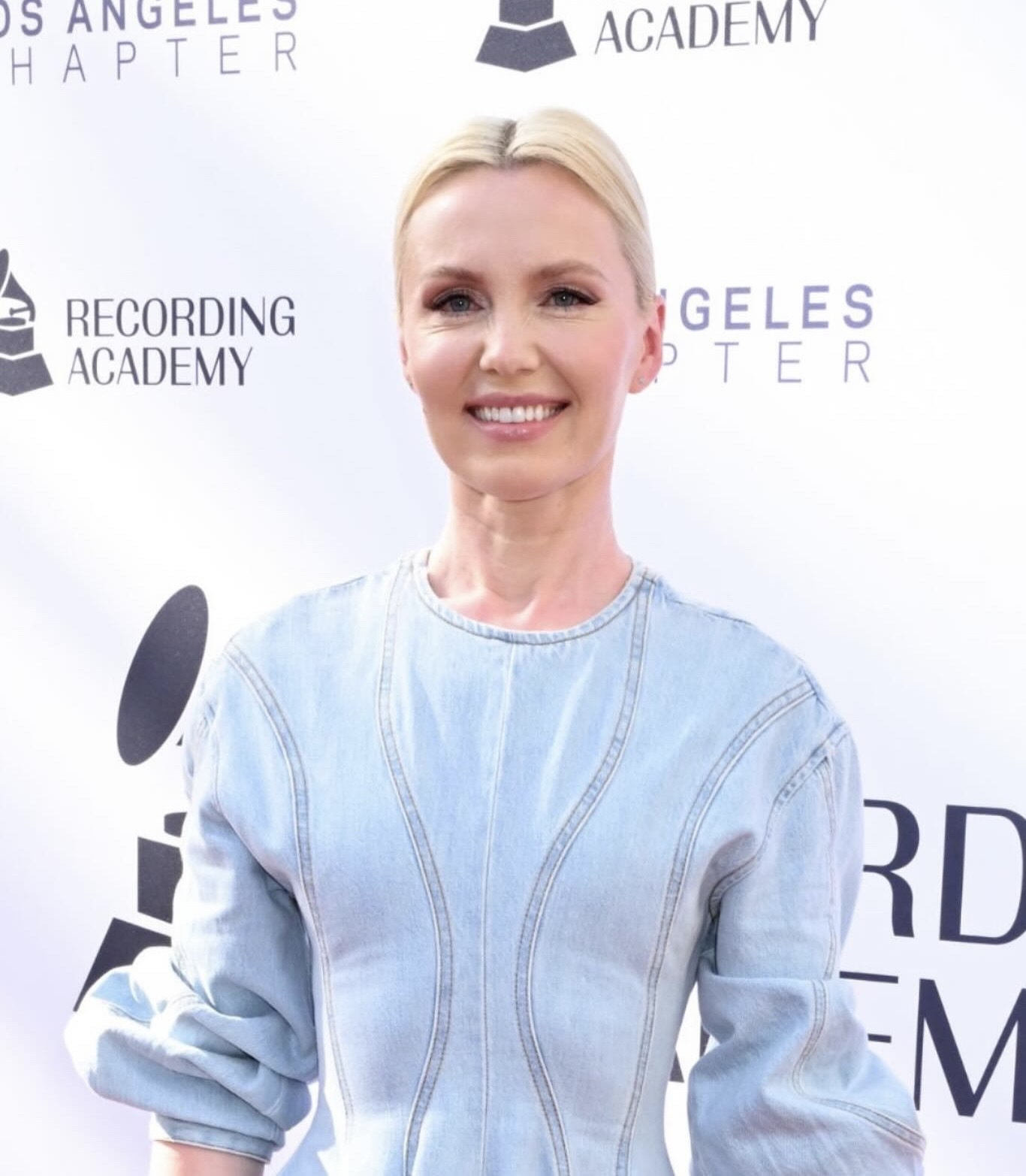
- Born: Alevtina Schepetina; Oryol, Russia
- Other name: ALYA
- Education: Lomonosov Moscow State University; Moscow State Institute of International Relations
- Occupations: Philanthropist, artist, singer, songwriter
- Organization: Michelson Philanthropies
- Board member of: California Film Commission; Found Animals Foundation; Michelson Medical Research Foundation; Michelson 20MM Foundation
- Spouse: Gary Michelson
- Website: https://www.alyamichelson.com/

Alya Michelson, also known as Alya (stylized as ALYA), is a Russian-born philanthropist, songwriter, and singer. A vocalist on the Grammy Award-winning album Mystic Mirror by White Sun, she was formerly a special correspondent for Russia's international news agency, RIA Novosti, and a news anchor for Vesti-FM and Mayak. She is the co-chair of Michelson Philanthropies and a member of the California Film Commission's board of directors. She released her debut album, Ten Years of Solitude, in February 2019.

== Early life and education ==
Michelson (b. Alevtina Schepetina) was born in Oryol, Russia in 1983. While in high school, she worked at Russkoe Radio and as a freelance journalist for local publications. In addition to attending a traditional high school, she studied vocal technique at Oryol Musical School.

Michelson attended Moscow State University, where she received a degree in journalism. She earned a master's degree in economics from Moscow State Institute of International Relations.

== Career ==
=== Journalism and public relations ===
While in Russia, Michelson covered breaking news as well as business, politics, and the military as a special news correspondent for RIA Novosti. Fluent in Japanese, she was initially based in Moscow, and later reported from Tokyo. As a journalist, she reported on stories such as the Kursk submarine disaster and the Beslan school siege. She also contributed to the independent newspaper, Kommersant, and served as a news anchor for the national news stations Vesti-FM and Mayak.

Michelson enrolled at Moscow State Institute of International Relations in 2006. She graduated with a Master's Degree in Economics in 2008, and subsequently served as the press secretary for the vice chairman of a State legislative body in the ruling assembly of Russia, leaving in 2012 to pursue music.

=== Music ===
In 2018, while living in Los Angeles, Michelson independently released her first single, "Animals". She also directed the music video for the song, which won a Los Angeles Cinema Festival of Hollywood Award and the Best Music Video award at the California Women's Film Festival. She followed "Animals" with “Half of the Sun" and "Puppet Strings"; "Puppet Strings" hit the Top 10 on the Euro Indie Music Chart and the Independent Airplay Chart.

Produced and mixed by David J. Holman, Michelson released her debut album, Ten Years of Solitude, in February 2019. In April, it was nominated for four Independent Music Awards, including Best Electronic Album. Michelson released the single "American Beauty" in October 2019 and directed its accompanying music video. Produced by Bill Schnee, a Dave Aude remix of the track charted on the Billboard dance club charts, peaking at #15 in February 2020. In September 2021, she released the single "Pleasure is Mine", which was also produced by Schnee. It was the most added song on the November 23, 2021 Billboard Pop Airplay/Mainstream Top 100 chart.

In 2022, Michelson provided vocals for White Sun's Grammy-award winning album Mystic Mirror. In 2023, she released the single “Crazy” and the EP Crazy Remixes. The EP was #1 on the iTunes dance charts for several weeks. Her December 2023 holiday EP featured "Silent Night", a duet with Eric Clapton. It charted in the UK and Germany. Her song "Hope" was released in 2024. A second version of the song, "Hope: The Sequel" (featuring Erica Campbell and D Smoke), debuted on the Billboard digital gospel chart in May 2025.

== Philanthropy ==
Michelson is the co-chair of Michelson Philanthropies. She serves on the board of directors for the Michelson Found Animals Foundation, Michelson Medical Research Foundation, Michelson Center for Public Policy, and The Michelson 20MM Foundation. She and her husband signed the Giving Pledge in 2016, committing to donate the majority of their wealth to philanthropic causes, and in 2017 donated $50 million to found the USC Michelson Center for Convergent Bioscience at the University of Southern California.

In 2022, Michelson received the Inner City Law Center's Humanitarian Award. She received the Humanitarian Award from the Society for Brain Mapping and Therapeutics in 2024. In August 2024, on behalf of the Michelson Medical Research Foundation, Michelson and her husband gave the California Institute for Immunology and Immunotherapy $100 million to establish two research facilities. They also gave $20 million to the institute to provide research grants for young students.

Michelson has helped to find housing for refugees left homeless by the Russo-Ukrainian War.
