= White Sun =

White Sun or sun may refer to:

- White Sun (band), an American band
  - White Sun (album), a 2015 album by White Sun
  - White Sun II, a 2016 album by White Sun
  - White Sun III, a 2018 album by White Sun
- White Sun (film), a 2016 Nepali film
- A star with a suitable spectral type

== See also ==
- White Sun of the Desert, a 1969 Soviet film
- Blue Sky with a White Sun, an emblem of the Republic of China
