= Peter Kater =

German-American pianist and composer (born 1958)

- Born: May 28, 1958 (age 67); Germany
- Genres: New Age, electronic, ambient
- Occupation: Musician
- Instruments: Piano, keyboards
- Years active: 1983–present
- Labels: Point of Light, Silver Wave, Real Music, Gaia/Polygram
- Website: www.peterkater.com

Peter Kater (born May 28, 1958) is a German-born American pianist, composer and Grammy Award winner.

When he was four, he moved with his family from Germany to New Jersey. He studied classical piano at an early age. In 1977 when he was eighteen, Peter moved to Boulder, Colorado, where he spent thirteen years before moving to Virginia and later Los Angeles, building his own studio, and starting his own record label. His debut album, Spirit (Silver Wave, 1983), and those that followed reached the Top 20 New Age music chart at Billboard magazine. These included several collaborations with R. Carlos Nakai. He has also collaborated with Snatam Kaur, Michael DeMaria, Tina Guo, Nawang Khechog and Dominic Miller. His first Grammy Award nomination was for the album Red Moon (Silver Wave, 2003) for Best New Age Album. 13 more nominations followed with his first win coming in 2018 for the album Dancing on Water (Point of Light, 2017). Kater has sold millions of records, scored the music of over 100 television and film productions including 11 On & Off-Broadway dramatic plays and is a proud recipient of the Environment Leadership Award from the United Nations.

Dancing On Water debuted at number three on the Billboard New Age Albums Chart, 2017. Inner Passion (Hearts of Space, 2016), his collaboration with cellist Tina Guo, debuted at number four on the Billboard New Age Albums Chart.

== Awards and honors ==
- Grammy Award Winner for Best New Age Album for "Wings" (2020) and "Dancing On Water" (2018). Grammy Award nominations for Best New Age Album – Red Moon (2004), Piano (2005), Fire (2007), Faces of the Sun (2008), Ambrosia (2009), In a Dream (2010), Wind Rock Sea & Flame (2012), Light Body (2013), Illumination (2014), Ritual (with R. Carlos Nakai) (2015), Love (2016), Inner Passion (with Tina Guo) (2017)
- NAIRD Best New Age Album Indie Award, Migration (1992)

== Discography ==
- 1983 Spirit (Point of Light)
- 1984 Coming Home (Point of Light)
- 1985 Two Hearts (Point of Light)
- 1986 Thanksgiving (Two Hearts)
- 1986 Anthem (Nebula)
- 1987 For Christmas (Silver Wave)
- 1987 The Fool & The Hummingbird (Silver Wave)
- 1988 Gateway (Gramavision)/(Point of Light)
- 1989 Moments, Dreams & Visions (Silver Wave)
- 1990 Natives (Silver Wave)
- 1991 Homage (Silver Wave)
- 1991 The Season (Silver Wave)
- 1991 Rooftops (Silver Wave)
- 1992 Migration (Silver Wave)
- 1993 How the West Was Lost (Silver Wave)
- 1994 Pursuit of Happiness (Silver Wave)
- 1994 Honorable Sky (Silver Wave)
- 1995 How the West Was Lost, Vol. 2 (Silver Wave)
- 1996 Soul Nature (Silver Wave)
- 1996 Improvisations in Concert (Silver Wave)
- 1997 Essence (Earth Sea)
- 1998 Compassion (Source UK) / (Earth Sea)
- 1998 The Dance of Innocents (Compendia/Intersound)
- 1999 Birds of Prey (Intersound)
- 1999 The Winds of Devotion (Earth Sea)
- 1999 Eco-Challenge: Music from Discovery Channel (Earth Sea)
- 2001 Heart's Desire (Source UK)
- 2001 Through Windows & Walls (Silver Wave)
- 2002 Inner Works: Piano & Strings (Source UK)
- 2003 Red Moon Silver World / (Silver Wave)
- 2003 Xmas Ecstasy (Silver Wave)
- 2003 Piano (Point of Light)
- 2005 Elements Series: Earth (Real Music)
- 2005 Elements Series: Water (Real Music)
- 2005 Elements Series: Fire (Real Music)
- 2005 Elements Series: Air (Real Music)
- 2006 10 Questions for the Dalai Lama [Original Score] (Silver Wave)
- 2007 Point of Light (Wellness)
- 2007 Faces of the Sun (Silver Wave)
- 2009 Healing Series, Vol. 4: Walk in Beauty (Point of Light)
- 2009 In a Dream (Point of Light)
- 2009 Healing Series, Vol. 5: Cloud Hands (Point of Light)
- 2009 Healing Series, Vol. 3: Ambrosia (Point of Light)
- 2009 Healing Series, Vol. 2: Compassion (Point of Light)
- 2009 Healing Series, Vol. 1: Essence (Point of Light)
- 2009 Piano Christmas (Point of Light)
- 2010 Call of Love (Point of Light)
- 2011 Wind, Rock, Sea & Flame (Point of Light)
- 2012 Light Body (CD Baby) /(Mysterium)
- 2013 Heart of the Universe (Spirit Voyage)
- 2013 Illumination: A Healing Journey (Mysterium)
- 2014 Civil War: The Untold Story [Original TV Soundtrack] (Point of Light)
- 2014 Ritual (Mysterium)
- 2015 Etheria (Real Music)
- 2015 Heart of Silence: Piano and Flute Meditations (Sounds True)
- 2015 Love (Mysterium)
- 2016 Inner Passion with Tina Guo (Hearts of Space Records)
- 2017 Dancing on Water (Point of Light)
- 2018 She (Real Music)
- 2020 Wings
- 2022 Soul Story
- 2022 Native America
- 2025 Untethered Heart (Point of Light)

== Filmography ==
Year	Film	Involvement
1989	Beyond the Edge (documentary)	Song Performer: Spirit
1991	Scenes from a Mall (feature film)	Song Performer: Deck the Halls
1994	Natural Born Killers (feature film)	Songwriter and Performer: Earth
2006	10 Questions for the Dalai Lama (documentary)	Original music score, singing, music recording, piano, synthesizers
2007	Where the Indian Lies (short)	Composition
2009	Gray Eagles (video short)	Composition, music engineering
2010	The Legend of Secret Pass	Music

== See also ==
- List of ambient music artists
