= Grammy Award for Best New Age, Ambient or Chant Album =

Honor presented to recording artists for quality New Age music albums

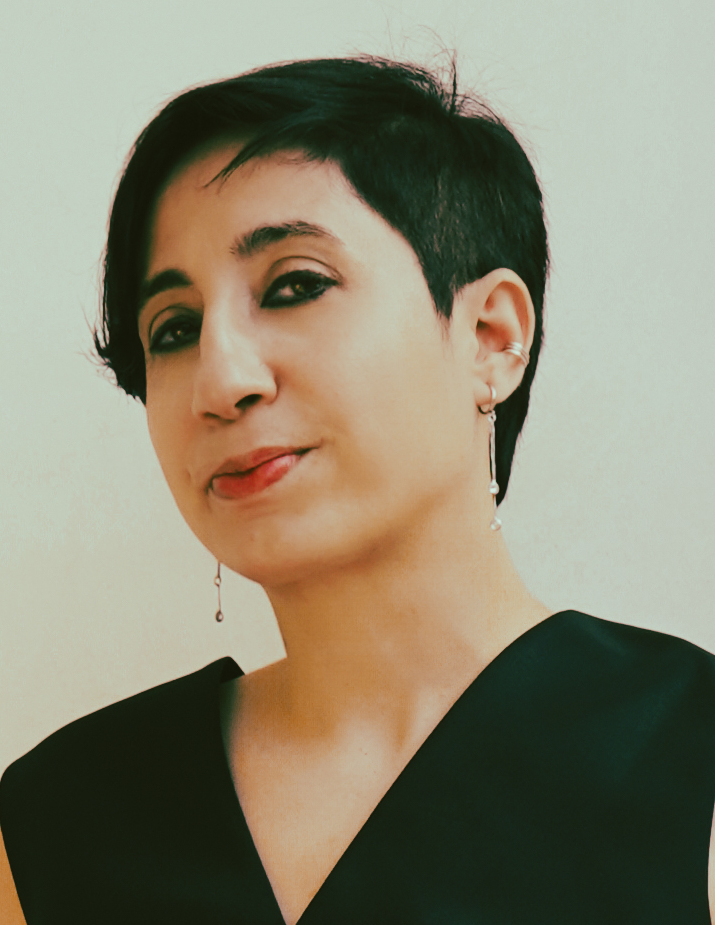
- Nomadica by Carla Patullo (pictured) featuring The Scorchio Quartet & Tonality is the most recent recipient
- Awarded for: Quality albums in the new-age music genre
- Presented by: National Academy of Recording Arts and Sciences
- Formerly called: Grammy Award for Best New Age Album (1992–2022); others
- First award: 1987
- Currently held by: Carla Patullo featuring The Scorchio Quartet and Tonality – Nomadica (2026)
- Website: grammy.com

The Grammy Award for Best New Age, Ambient or Chant Album is presented to recording artists for quality albums in the new-age music genre at the Grammy Awards, a ceremony that was established in 1958 and originally called the Gramophone Awards. Honors in several categories are presented at the ceremony annually by the National Academy of Recording Arts and Sciences of the United States to "honor artistic achievement, technical proficiency, and overall excellence in the recording industry, without regard to album sales or chart position".

Originally called the Grammy Award for Best New Age Recording, the honor was first presented to Swiss musician Andreas Vollenweider at the 29th Grammy Awards in 1987 for his album Down to the Moon. Two compilation albums featuring Windham Hill Records artists were nominated that same year. The record label was founded by William Ackerman, later an award nominee and 2005 winner for the album Returning. From 1988 to 1991 the category was known as Best New Age Performance. From 1992 to 2023, the award was presented as Best New Age Album. Beginning in 2001, award recipients included the producers, engineers, and/or mixers associated with the nominated work in addition to the recording artists. From 2023, the category has been known as Best New Age, Ambient or Chant Album.

While "new-age" music can be difficult to define, journalist Steven Rea described the genre as "music that is acoustic, electronic, jazzy, folky and incorporates classical and pop elements, Eastern and Latin influences, exotic instrumentation, and environmental sound effects." According to the category description guide for the 52nd Grammy Awards, the award is presented for instrumental or vocal new-age albums "containing at least 51% playing time of newly recorded material", with seasonal recordings not being eligible. The addition of the award category reflected a "coming of age" of the music genre, though some musicians classified as new age dislike the term "new age" and some of its negative connotations.

== Multiple wins ==
As of 2015, Paul Winter holds the record for the most wins in this category, having won six times (four times as the leader of the group Paul Winter Consort). Winter is the only musician to win the award consecutively; he received an award in 1994 for Spanish Angel as a member of his ensemble and another in 1995 for Prayer for the Wild Things as a solo artist. Irish musician Enya has received four awards. Kitarō holds the record for the most nominations, with sixteen (with only one win, in 2001). All five volumes of Kitarō's Sacred Journey of Ku-Kai series were nominated for Best New Age Album.

Pianist Peter Kater held the record for most nominations without a win, with 12, until he finally won his first Grammy (for Dancing on Water) in 2018. He also holds the record for the most consecutive nominations, with 11, having been nominated every year between 2007 and 2018.

Native American flutist R. Carlos Nakai is the only artist to be nominated for more than one work within the same year; for the 42nd Grammy Awards he was nominated alongside Paul Horn for Inside Monument Valley and for his own album, Inner Voices.

== Recipients ==
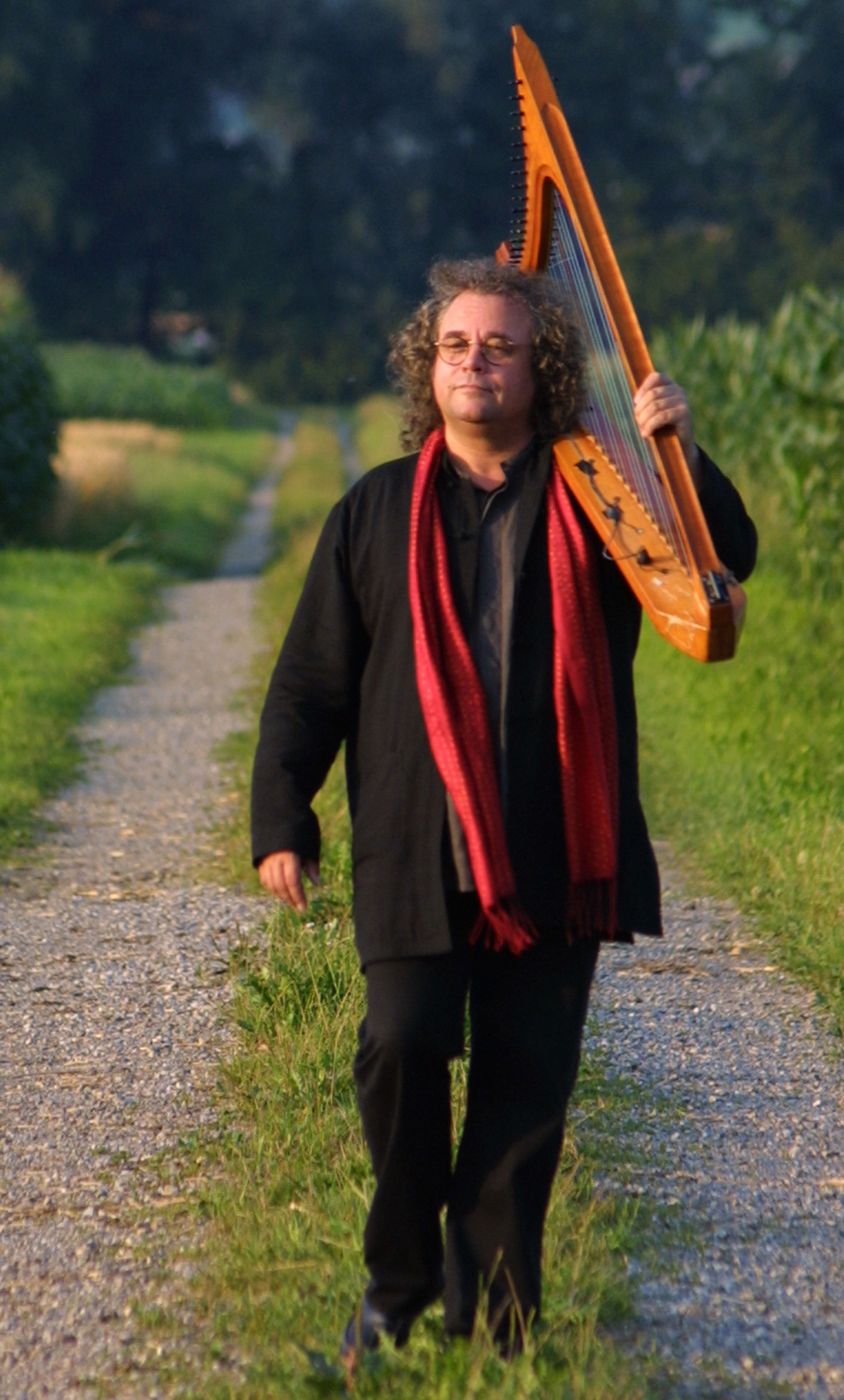
1987 award winner Andreas Vollenweider

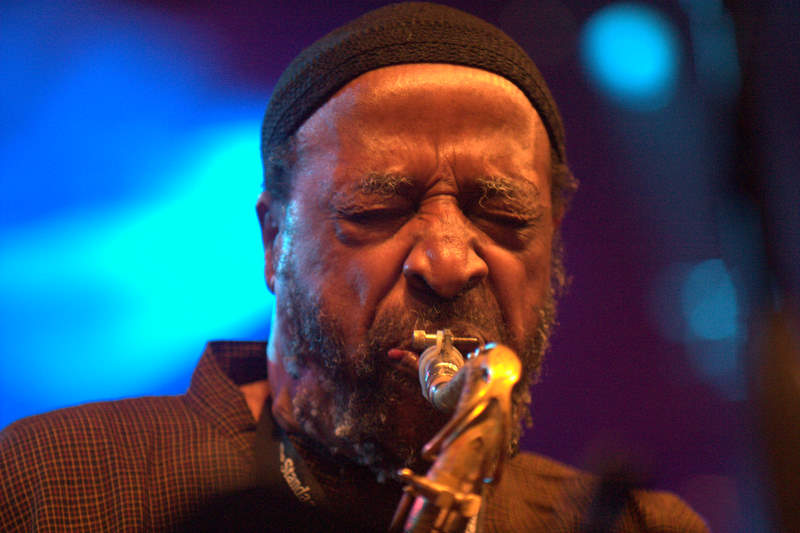
1988 award recipient Yusef Lateef in 2007

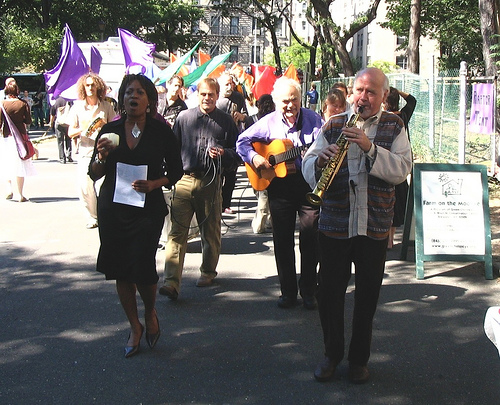
Members of the four-time award-winning band Paul Winter Consort performing in 2005

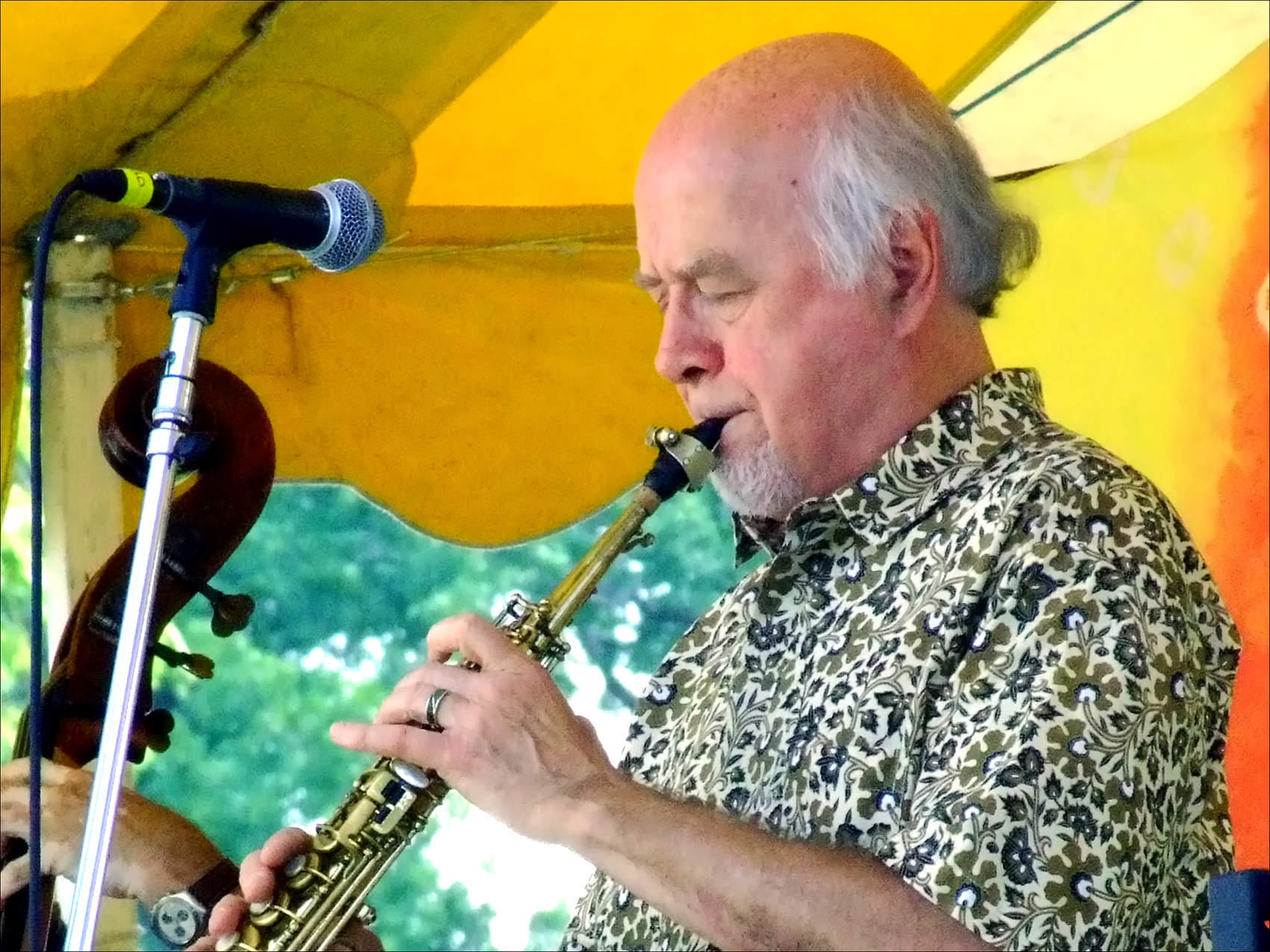
Paul Winter of the Paul Winter Consort, a two-time award winner as a solo artist, performing at the Clearwater Festival in 2007

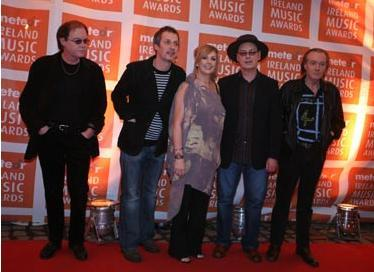
Members of the 1999 award-winning band Clannad at the 2007 Meteor Awards

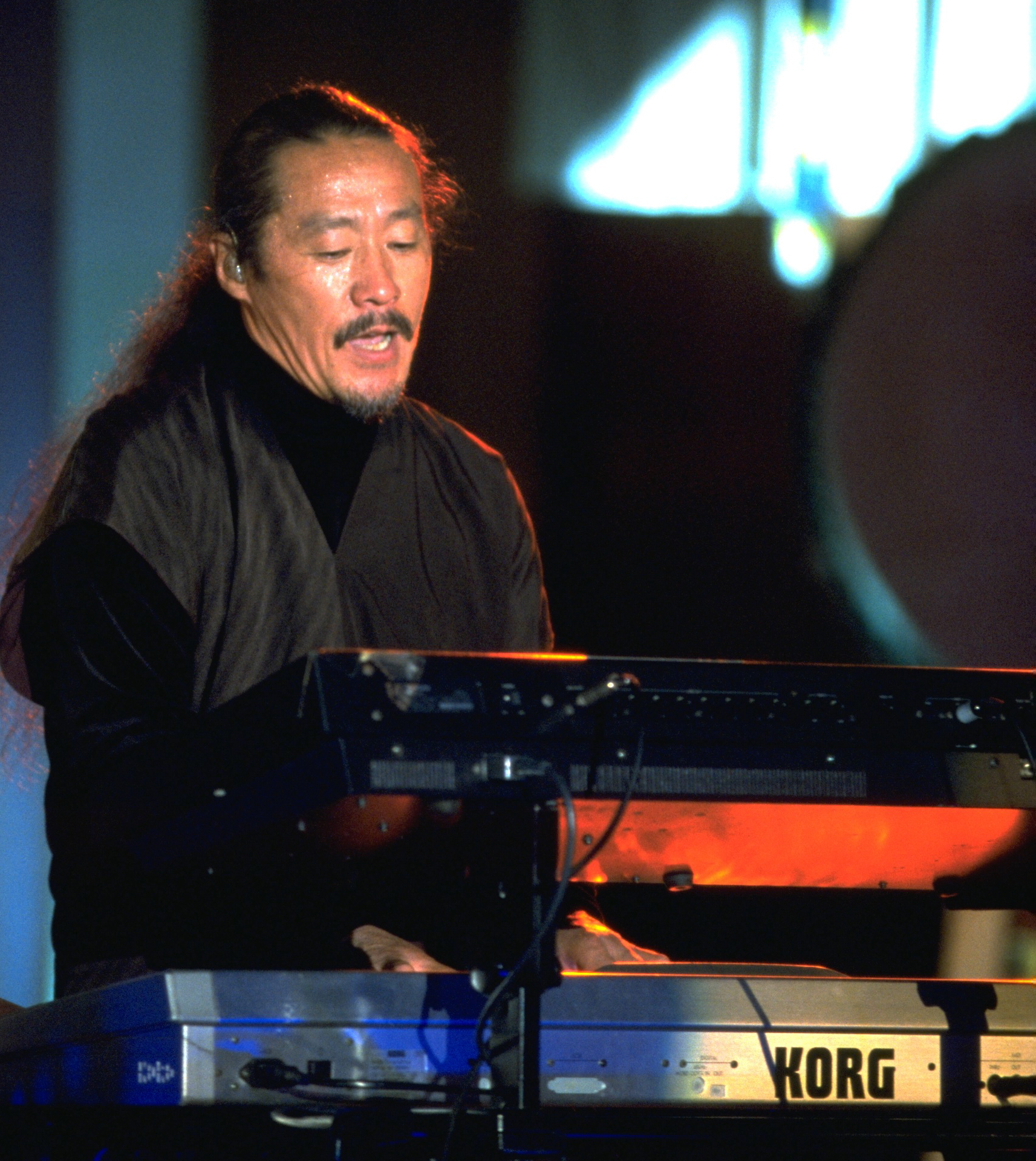
2001 award winner and frequent nominee Kitarō

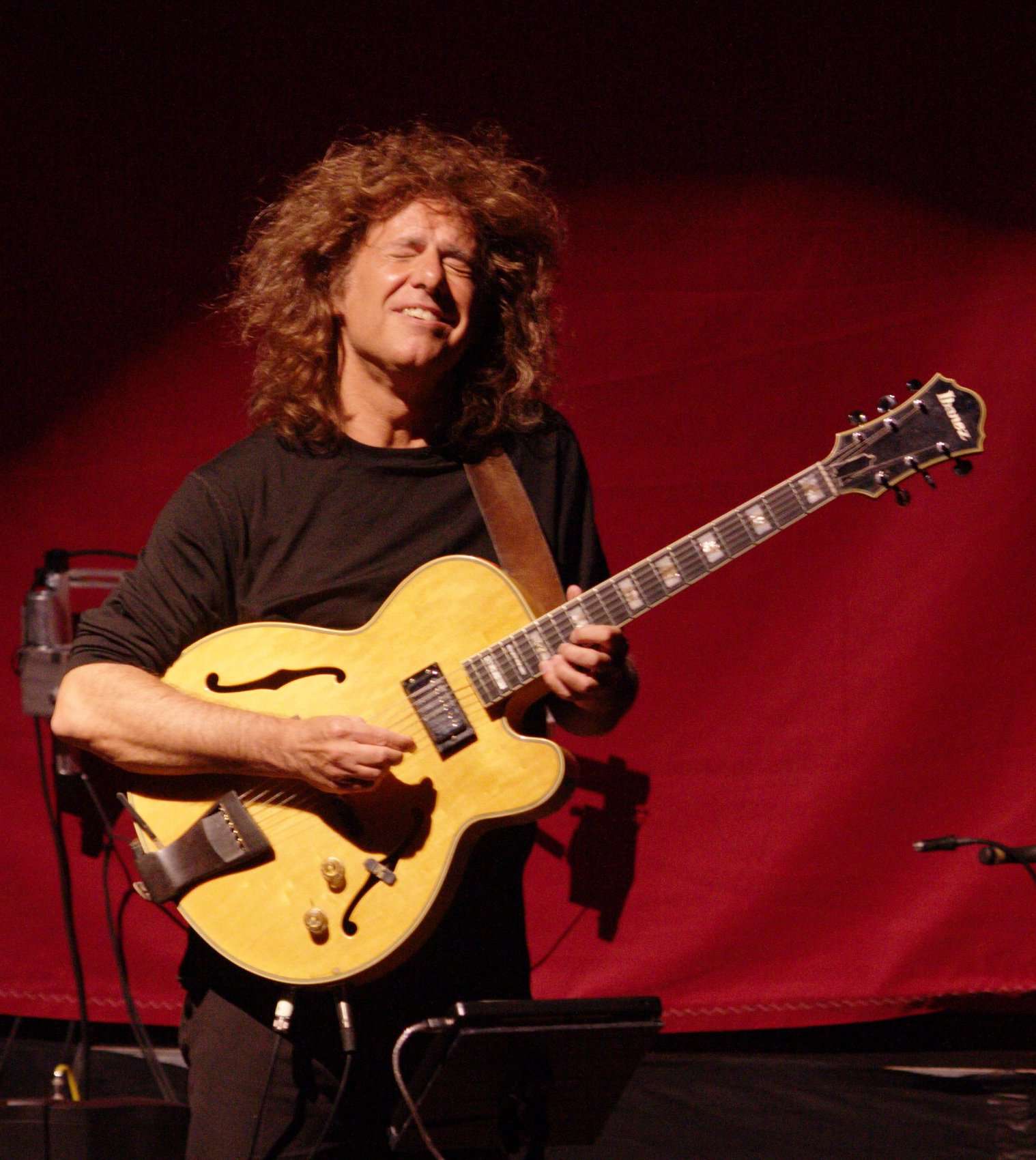
2004 award recipient Pat Metheny performing in 2008

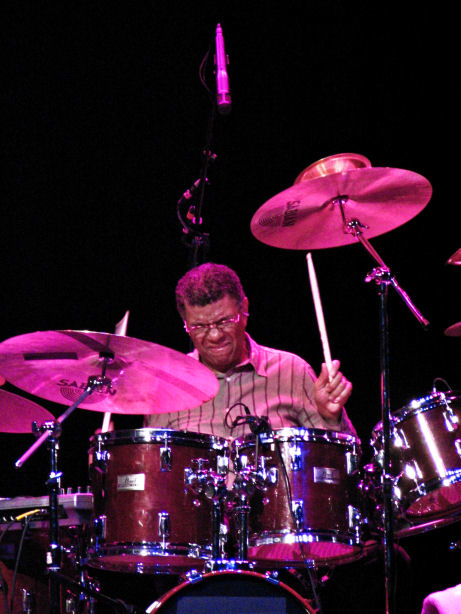
2009 award recipient Jack DeJohnette performing in 2006

=== 1980s ===
Year	Work	Artist
1987
1987	Down to the Moon	Andreas Vollenweider
1987	Canyon	Paul Winter
1987	Rendez-Vous	Jean Michel Jarre
1987	Windham Hill Records Sampler '86	Various Artists
1987	A Winter's Solstice	Various Artists
1988
1988	Yusef Lateef's Little Symphony	Yusef Lateef
1988	Between Two Worlds	Patrick O'Hearn
1988	"The Field"	Kitarō
1988	"Reconciliations"	Liz Story
1988	"Sweet Intentions"	Montreaux
1988	Traveler	Paul Horn
1989
1989	Folksongs for a Nuclear Village	Shadowfax
1989	Castalia	Mark Isham
1989	"Down in Belgorod"	Paul Winter
1989	Local Color	Steve Khan and Rob Mounsey
1989	Neverland	Suzanne Ciani

=== 1990s ===
Year	Work	Artist
1990
1990	Passion: Music for The Last Temptation of Christ	Peter Gabriel
1990	Dancing with the Lion	Andreas Vollenweider
1990	"Icarus"	Paul Winter
1990	"Orinoco Flow (Sail Away)"	Enya
1990	Tibet	Mark Isham
1991
1991	Mark Isham	Mark Isham
1991	Balkan	Mysterious Voices of Bulgaria
1991	"Caravan of Dreams"	Acoustic Alchemy
1991	Earth: Voices of a Planet	Paul Winter
1991	Taproot	Michael Hedges
1991	Yellowstone: The Music of Nature	Mannheim Steamroller
1992
1992	Fresh Aire 7	Chip Davis (Mannheim Steamroller)
1992	Borrasca	Ottmar Liebert
1992	Canyon Dreams	Tangerine Dream
1992	Hotel Luna	Suzanne Ciani
1992	In the Wake of the Wind	David Arkenstone
1993
1993	Shepherd Moons	Enya
1993	Dare to Dream	Yanni
1993	Dream	Kitarō
1993	Esperanto	Shadowfax
1993	Rockoon	Tangerine Dream
1994
1994	Spanish Angel	Paul Winter Consort
1994	220 Volt Live	Tangerine Dream
1994	Banba	Clannad
1994	The Hours Between Night + Day	Ottmar Liebert and Luna Negra
1994	In My Time	Yanni
1995
1995	Prayer for the Wild Things	Paul Winter
1995	Acoustic Planet	Craig Chaquico
1995	The Garden	Michael Nesmith
1995	Mandala	Kitarō
1995	Turn of the Tides	Tangerine Dream
1996
1996	Forest	George Winston
1996	Dream Suite	Suzanne Ciani
1996	An Enchanted Evening	Kitarō
1996	Trust	Patrick O'Hearn
1996	Tyranny of Beauty	Tangerine Dream
1997
1997	The Memory of Trees	Enya
1997	Arcanum	Acoustic Alchemy
1997	Lore	Clannad
1997	Opium	Ottmar Liebert and Luna Negra
1997	Pianissimo II	Suzanne Ciani
1998
1998	Oracle	Michael Hedges
1998	Canyon Lullaby	Paul Winter
1998	Le Roi Est Mort, Vive Le Roi!	Enigma
1998	Oceanic	Vangelis
1998	Voyager	Mike Oldfield
1999
1999	Landmarks	Clannad
1999	Gaia Onbashira	Kitarō
1999	Grand Passion	John Tesh
1999	Sound of Wind Driven Rain	William Ackerman
1999	The Water Garden	Alex De Grassi

=== 2000s ===
Year	Work	Artist
2000
2000	Celtic Solstice	Paul Winter and Friends
2000	Citizen of the World	David Arkenstone
2000	Inner Voices	R. Carlos Nakai
2000	Inside Monument Valley	Paul Horn and R. Carlos Nakai
2000	Plains	George Winston
2000	Turning	Suzanne Ciani
2001
2001	Thinking of You	Kitarō
2001	East of the Moon	David Lanz
2001	Highland Cathedral	Phil Coulter
2001	In a Distant Place	R. Carlos Nakai, William Eaton, Will Clipman and Nawang Khechog
2001	Whisper to the Wild Water	Maire Brennan
2002
2002	A Day Without Rain	Enya
2002	Ancient	Kitarō
2002	Cello Blue	David Darling
2002	Live from Montana	Philip Aaberg
2002	Sacred Spirit II: More Chants and Dances of the Native Americans	Sacred Spirit
2003
2003	Acoustic Garden	Eric Tingstad and Nancy Rumbel
2003	An Ancient Journey	Kitarō
2003	Fourth World	R. Carlos Nakai
2003	Hearing Voices	William Ackerman
2003	Mondo Rama	Jai Uttal and the Pagan Love Orchestra
2004
2004	One Quiet Night	Pat Metheny
2004	Inner Journeys: Myths & Legends	Cusco
2004	Red Moon	Peter Kater
2004	Sacred Journey of Ku-Kai	Kitarō
2004	Solace	Michael Hoppé
2005
2005	Returning	William Ackerman
2005	American River	Jonathan Elias
2005	Atlantis: A Symphonic Journey	David Arkenstone
2005	Piano	Peter Kater
2005	Two Horizons	Moya Brennan
2006
2006	Silver Solstice	Paul Winter Consort
2006	Montana: A Love Story	George Winston
2006	Music in the Key of Om	Jack DeJohnette
2006	People of Peace	R. Carlos Nakai Quartet
2006	Sacred Journey of Ku-Kai, Volume 2	Kitarō
2007
2007	Amarantine	Enya
2007	Beyond Words	Gentle Thunder with Will Clipman and AmoChip Dabney
2007	Elements Series: Fire	Peter Kater
2007	The Magical Journeys of Andreas Vollenweider	Andreas Vollenweider
2007	A Posteriori	Enigma
2008
2008	Crestone	Paul Winter Consort
2008	Faces of the Sun	Peter Kater
2008	One Guitar	Ottmar Liebert
2008	Sacred Journey of Ku-Kai, Volume 3	Kitarō
2008	Southwest	Eric Tingstad
2009
2009	Peace Time	Jack DeJohnette
2009	Ambrosia	Peter Kater
2009	Meditations	William Ackerman
2009	Pathfinder	Will Clipman
2009	The Scent of Light	Ottmar Liebert and Luna Negra

=== 2010s ===
Year	Work	Artist
2010
2010	Prayer for Compassion	David Darling
2010	Faith	Jim Brickman
2010	Impressions of the West Lake	Kitarō
2010	In a Dream	Peter Kater, Dominic Miller, Kenny Loggins and Jaques Morelenbaum
2010	Laserium for the Soul	Henta
2011
2011	Miho: Journey to the Mountain	Paul Winter Consort
2011	Dancing Into Silence	R. Carlos Nakai, William Eaton and Will Clipman
2011	Instrumental Oasis, Vol. 4	Zamora
2011	Ocean	Michael Brant DeMaria
2011	Sacred Journey of Ku-Kai, Volume 4	Kitarō
2012
2012	What's It All About	Pat Metheny
2012	Gaia	Michael Brant DeMaria
2012	Instrumental Oasis, Vol. 6	Zamora
2012	Northern Seas	Al Conti
2012	Wind, Rock, Sea & Flame	Peter Kater
2013
2013	Echoes of Love	Omar Akram
2013	Bindu	Michael Brant DeMaria
2013	Deep Alpha	Steven Halpern
2013	Light Body	Peter Kater
2013	Live Ananda	Krishna Das
2013	Troubadours of the Rhine	Loreena McKennitt
2014
2014	Love's River	Laura Sullivan
2014	Awakening the Fire	R. Carlos Nakai and Will Clipman
2014	Final Call	Kitarō
2014	Illumination	Peter Kater
2014	Lux	Brian Eno
2015
2015	Winds of Samsara	Ricky Kej and Wouter Kellerman
2015	Bhakti	Paul Avgerinos
2015	In Love and Longing	Silvia Nakkach and David Darling
2015	Ritual	Peter Kater and R. Carlos Nakai
2015	Symphony Live in Istanbul	Kitarō
2016
2016	Grace	Paul Avgerinos
2016	Asia Beauty	Ron Korb
2016	Bhakti Without Borders	Madi Das
2016	Love	Peter Kater
2016	Voyager	Catherine Duc
2017
2017	White Sun II	White Sun
2017	Dark Sky Island	Enya
2017	Inner Passion	Peter Kater and Tina Guo
2017	Orogen	John Burke
2017	Rosetta	Vangelis
2018
2018	Dancing on Water	Peter Kater
2018	Reflection	Brian Eno
2018	Sacred Journey of Ku-Kai, Volume 5	Kitarō
2018	SongVersation: Medicine	India.Arie
2018	Spiral Revelation	Steve Roach
2019
2019	Opium Moon	Opium Moon
2019	Beloved	Snatam Kaur
2019	Hiraeth	Lisa Gerrard and David Kuckhermann
2019	Moku Maluhia – Peaceful Island	Jim Kimo West
2019	Molecules of Motion	Steve Roach

=== 2020s ===
Year	Work	Artist
2020
2020	Wings	Peter Kater
2020	Deva	Deva Premal
2020	Fairy Dreams	David Arkenstone
2020	Homage to Kindness	David Darling
2020	Verve	Sebastian Plano
2021
2021	More Guitar Stories	Jim "Kimo" West
2021	Form//Less	Superposition
2021	Meditations	Cory Wong and Jon Batiste
2021	Periphery	Priya Darshini
2021	Songs from the Bardo	Laurie Anderson, Tenzin Choegyal and Jesse Paris Smith
2022
2022	Divine Tides	Stewart Copeland and Ricky Kej
2022	Brothers	Will Ackerman, Jeff Oster and Tom Eaton
2022	Night + Day	Opium Moon
2022	Pangaea	Wouter Kellerman and David Arkenstone
2022	Pieces of Forever	Laura Sullivan
2023
2023	Mystic Mirror	White Sun
2023	Joy	Paul Avgerinos
2023	Mantra Americana	Madi Das and Dave Stringer with Bhakti Without Borders
2023	The Passenger	Cheryl B. Engelhardt
2023	Positano Songs	Will Ackerman
2024
2024	So She Howls	Carla Patullo featuring Tonality and The Scorchio Quartet
2024	Aquamarine	Kirsten Agresta-Copely
2024	Moments of Beauty	Omar Akram
2024	Ocean Dreaming Ocean	David Darling and Hans Christian
2024	Some Kind of Peace (Piano Reworks)	Ólafur Arnalds
2025
2025	Triveni	Wouter Kellerman, Eru Matsumoto and Chandrika Tandon
2025	Break of Dawn	Ricky Kej
2025	Chapter II: How Dark It Is Before Dawn	Anoushka Shankar
2025	Opus	Ryuichi Sakamoto
2025	Warriors of Light	Radhika Vekaria
2026
2026	Nomadica	Carla Patullo featuring The Scorchio Quartet and Tonality
2026	According to the Moon	Cheryl B. Engelhardt, GEM and Dallas String Quartet
2026	The Colors in My Mind	Chris Redding
2026	Into the Forest	Jahnavi Harrison
2026	Kuruvinda	Kirsten Agresta-Copely
2027	Night Music	Vicente Avella
2027	Balance	Paul Avgerinos
2027	Liminal	Brian Eno & Beatie Wolfe
2027	Unspoken Psalms	Chris Redding
2027	Tantrika	White Sun

^{^[I]} Each year is linked to the article about the Grammy Awards held that year.

== Artists with multiple wins ==
6 wins

- Paul Winter

4 wins

- Enya

2 wins

- Peter Kater
- Ricky Kej
- Wouter Kellerman
- Pat Metheny
- Carla Patullo
- The Scorchio Quartet
- Tonality
- White Sun

== Artists with multiple nominations ==
16 nominations

- Kitarō

14 nominations

- Peter Kater

11 nominations

- Paul Winter

8 nominations

- R. Carlos Nakai

6 nominations

- Enya

5 nominations

- David Arkenstone
- Suzanne Ciani
- Will Clipman
- David Darling
- Ottmar Liebert
- Tangerine Dream

4 nominations

- William Ackerman

3 nominations

- Paul Avgerinos
- Clannad
- Michael Brant DeMaria
- Mark Isham
- Ricky Kej
- Andreas Vollenweider
- George Winston

2 nominations

- Acoustic Alchemy
- Kirsten Agresta-Copely
- Omar Akram
- Madi Das
- Jack DeJohnette
- William Eaton
- Cheryl B. Engelhardt
- Enigma
- Brian Eno
- Michael Hedges
- Paul Horn
- Wouter Kellerman
- Ottmar Liebert
- Mannheim Steamroller
- Pat Metheny
- Patrick O'Hearn
- Opium Moon
- Carla Patullo
- Steve Roach
- Shadowfax
- Laura Sullivan
- Eric Tingstad
- Vangelis
- White Sun
- Yanni
- Zamora

== See also ==
- List of new-age music artists
- List of New Age topics
