= Karukas =

Karukas may refer to:

- Plural of karuka, a tree cultivated for its edible nuts
- Gregg Karukas (born 1956), US musician
