= Dallas String Quartet =

American classical crossover musical group

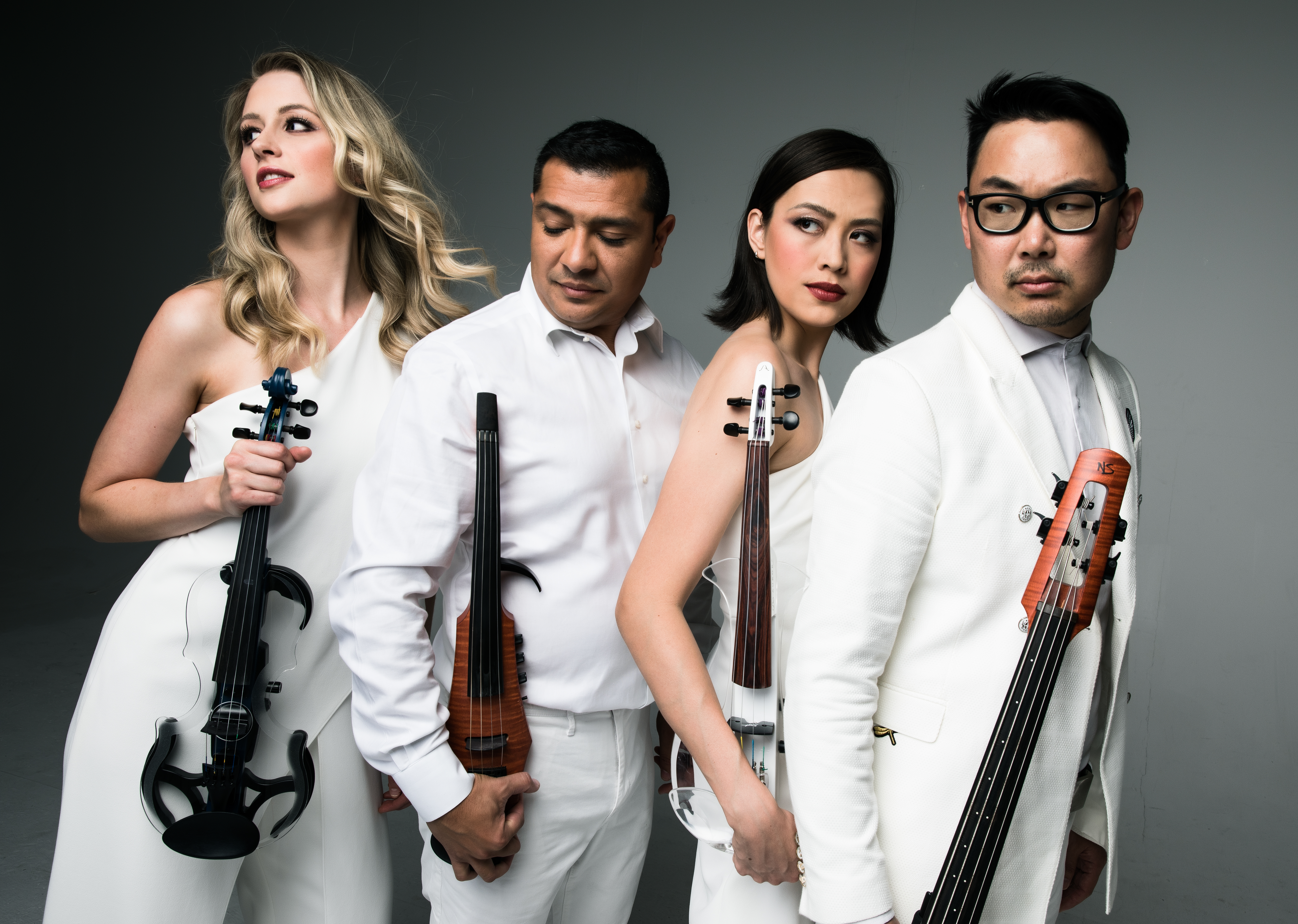

Background information
- Origin: Dallas, Texas
- Genres: Classical crossover; Classical; Pop
- Years active: 2007–present
- Members: Ion Zanca (viola); Melissa Priller (violin); Valory Hight (violin); Young Heo (bass); Efren Guzman, Jr. (drums and percussion); Joel White (guitar)
- Past members: Tatiana Glava (violin); Anastasiia Mazurok (violin); Eleanor Dunbar (violin); Anthony Plant (guitar)
- Website: www.dallasstringquartet.com
- Other name: DSQ

YouTube information
- Channel: Dallas String Quartet
- Genre: Music
- Views: 8.2 million
- Last updated: 24 February 2023

Dallas String Quartet (also known as DSQ and DSQ Electric) is an American classical crossover ensemble founded by violist and music producer Ion Zanca. Their album Love Always debuted at #2 on Billboard's Classical Crossover Albums and Classical Albums charts in October 2022. The musical group has performed private concerts for former presidents Barack Obama and George W. Bush, as well as performing at NFL and NBA games. They have shared the stage with Josh Groban, Kenny G, Chicago, Air Supply, and the Trans-Siberian Orchestra, among others.

As of January 2023, the group has more than 645 million streams on Pandora, 8.3 million views on YouTube, and 6.8 million listeners on Spotify. DSQ is a featured artist on the Grammy-nominated album The Passenger by Cheryl B. Engelhardt.

They got their first nomination for a Grammy Awards for their album According To The Moon in the Best New Age, Ambient, or Chant Album category.

== History ==
Dallas String Quartet was founded by violist Ion Zanca in 2007. While earning his master's degree at Southern Methodist University in Dallas, Texas, Zanca started a traditional string quartet with musicians he had met on campus. The ensemble began playing private events and building a fanbase of classical music audiences. The core group is composed of Zanca, violinists Melissa Priller and Valory Hight, and bassist Young Heo.

The group began recording covers of rock and pop songs, with The Verve's "Bitter Sweet Symphony" being their first release. Following the single's success, they released their first full-length album, Electric, in 2010. The album has currently had over 15 million streams.

In 2011, the quartet added drummer Efren Guzman and guitarist Joel White, becoming a sextet, but retained the name Dallas String Quartet, also known as DSQ. Often referred to as "Bach meets Bon Jovi", the group became known for their string renditions of popular rock and pop songs such as Lady Gaga's "Rain on Me", Guns N' Roses' "Sweet Child o' Mine", Katy Perry's "Firework", and OneRepublic's "Secrets", among others. Their video hits include "Despacito" (2017), with over two million views on YouTube, and Dua Lipa's "Don't Start Now".

They have released several holiday songs including their 2019 album A Very Merry Christmas and 2020's EP The Christmas Album. In 2021 they released their original Latin jazz single and video "Sabor" featuring Colombian jazz pianist Jesús Molina and a cover of Billie Eilish's "When the Party's Over" arranged by Ben Bram, the co-creator of Pentatonix. In October 2021, they released a collaboration with contemporary classical group The Piano Guys titled "You Are The Reason", which was included on The Piano Guys's full-length album Chill, released in October 2021. In 2022, they released a cover of Taylor Swift's "Wildest Dreams".

Their album Love Always debuted at #2 on Billboard's Classical Albums and Classical Crossover Albums charts for the week of October 18, 2022. In 2022 DSQ was featured on Cheryl B. Engelhardt's Grammy-nominated album The Passenger.

== Musical style ==
Dallas String Quartet is known for their contemporary classical renditions of modern pop songs.

== Live performance ==
In 2017, DSQ performed and recorded their first live album with the Irving Symphony, titled DSQ Live in Concert. Notable appearances include private performances for Presidents Obama and George W. Bush, the NBA, NFL, and college football playoffs. DSQ has sold out concert venues including the House of Blues and symphony centers, and has opened shows for Josh Groban, Chicago, Trans-Siberian Orchestra, Kenny G, and Air Supply, among others. In 2020, Dallas String Quartet signed with Universal Attraction Agency. In 2021, DSQ performed the ceremonial music at Gwen Stefani and Blake Shelton's July 3 wedding.

== Members ==
Founder and violist Ion Zanca studied viola at the National University of Music Bucharest before moving to the United States from Romania in 2001. He earned his Bachelor's and Master's Degree in Music Performance from Southern Methodist University in Dallas, Texas.

Valerie Hight is a violinist who received her bachelor's degree from Bard College and completed her master's degree at Southern Methodist University. She has performed with artists Paul Neubauer, Peter Wiley, Peter Serkin, and the Escher Quartet, and has performed at Carnegie Hall, David Geffen Hall, the Grand Ole Opry, and the Country Music Hall of Fame and Museum.

Melissa Priller is a violinist who earned her Bachelor of Music in Violin Performance with a minor in Arts Entrepreneurship from Southern Methodist University.

Young Heo is a jazz bassist who graduated from the University of Texas at Arlington and played with the UTA Jazz Orchestra. He graduated from the Jazz Program at the University of North Texas, where he performed with the Grammy-nominated One O'Clock Lab Band.

== Albums ==
- 2022 - Love Always
- 2020 - The Christmas Album
- 2020 - A Very Merry Christmas with Dallas String Quartet
- 2018 - DSQ Live in Concert
- 2016 - DSQ
- 2013 - Between Us
- 2011 - Red
- 2010 - Eclectric

== Singles ==
- 2022 - "Holy"
- 2022 - "10,000 Hours"
- 2022 - "Wildest Dreams"
- 2021 - "You Are The Reason" (with The Piano Guys)
- 2021 - "Hallelujah"
- 2021 - "When The Party's Over"
- 2021 - "Sabor" (feat. Jesús Molina)
- 2021 - "Love Again"
- 2020 - "Deck the Halls"
- 2020 - "Joy to the World"
- 2020 - "Rain on Me"
- 2020 - "Better Days"
- 2020 - "Don't Start Now"
- 2020 - "Lost in Japan"
- 2019 - "My Favorite Things"
- 2019 - "Señorita"
- 2019 - "Girls Like You"
- 2017 - "A DSQ Christmas: Dance Of The Sugar Plum Fairy"
- 2017 - "Despacito"
- 2016 - "Hello"
- 2014 - "Top Hits, Vol 1: Rather Be"
