= Faces in the Rocks =

Studio album by Mariee Sioux
- Released: August 1, 2007
- Recorded: Station To Station
- Genre: Folk
- Label: Grass Roots Record
- Producer: Gentle Thunder, Dana Gumbiner

Mariee Sioux chronology
| A Bundled Bundle of Bundles (2006) | Faces in the Rocks (2007) | Two Tongues At One Time/Buried In Teeth 7 (2007) |

Faces in the Rocks is the third solo album by the American folk musician Mariee Sioux, released on August 1, 2007 by Grass Roots Record. It was co-produced by Gentle Thunder and Dana Gumbiner. It was recorded, engineered and mastered by Dana Gumbiner.

== Track listing ==
Professional ratings
Review scores
| Source | Rating |
|---|---|
| AllMusic | - |

All tracks are written by Mariee Sioux

| No. | Title | Length |
|---|---|---|
| 1. | "Wizard Flurry Home" | 5:16 |
| 2. | "Buried in Teeth" | 5:59 |
| 3. | "Friendboats" | 3:40 |
| 4. | "Wild Eyes" | 9:15 |
| 5. | "Bravitzlana Rubakalva" | 4:00 |
| 6. | "Two Tongues" | 6:53 |
| 7. | "Bundles" | 9:54 |
| 8. | "Flowers and Blood" | 4:44 |

== Personnel ==
- Mariee Sioux - vocals, acoustic guitar, accordion
- Gentle Thunder - native flutes, percussion (buffalo drum], flute (native American), cymbal, rainstick, bass drum
- Gary Sobonya - Mandolin
- Jonathan Hischke - Bass
- Luke Janela - Cello
- Jeremiah Conte - artworks [Insert Drawings]
- Tahiti Pehrson - layout
