= Mariee Siou =

American folk singer-songwriter (born 1985)

Mariee Sioux
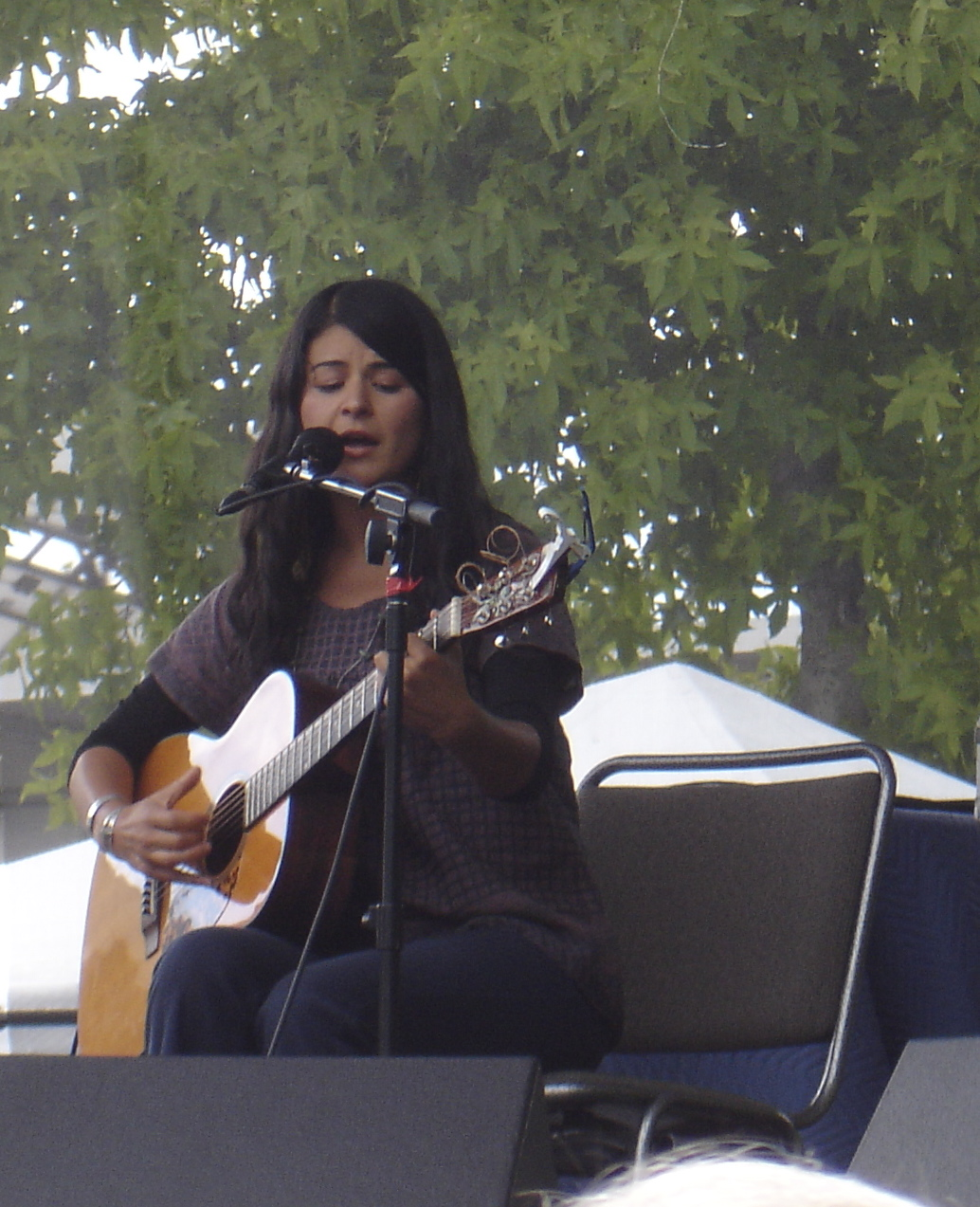

Background information
- Born: Mariee Sioux Sobonya; February 4, 1985 (age 41); Humboldt County, California, U.S.
- Origin: Nevada City, California, U.S.
- Genres: Folk, psychedelic folk
- Occupations: Singer, songwriter, musician
- Instrument: Acoustic guitar
- Years active: 2006–present
- Labels: Grass Roots Records (2007); Almost Musique (2012–); Whale Watch Records (2012–)
- Website: https://www.marieesiou.com/

Mariee Sioux (born February 4, 1985) is an American folk singer-songwriter.

== Biography ==
Her father Gary Sobonya is a mandolin player of Polish and Hungarian descent, and her mother Felicia is of Spanish, Paiute, and Indigenous Mexican descent. Siou grew up in Nevada City, California, where she wrote verses since she was a young child. At 17, she traveled to Patagonia to volunteer at a school for Indigenous children where she taught herself to play the guitar, and in 2006 she debuted her first self-released album A Bundled Bundle of Bundles. A year later, in 2007, she released her first studio album Faces in the Rocks which featured her delicate acoustic guitar music alongside the Native American flute by Gentle Thunder, and mandolin played by her father Gary Sobonya. The album had a Native American theme to it, filled with references to nature and the Native American people. Since the debut of her first album, she has drawn comparisons from Joanna Newsom to Joni Mitchell, and she has toured through North America and Europe.

She released a cover version of The Cure's "Lovesong" on the 2008 tribute record to The Cure, entitled Perfect as Cats.

In 2021, she began changing her stage name from Mariee Sioux, as named by her parents, to Mariee Siou in an effort to decolonize her name.

== Gift for the End ==
Gift for the End, Mariee Siou's second album, was recorded between April 2010 and August 2011 in Placerville's Monsoon Studios and in the Nevada City's Sun Dial studios. Guest musicians were mostly friends and family members, and it was produced and arranged by Mariee's partner Sean Kae.

A review on allmusic.com commented positively on influences from Joanna Newsom, Bert Jansch, and Nick Drake.

Gift for the End was released in Europe on March 5, 2012, on the Almost Musique label, and in the USA in April 2012 on Whale Watch Records.

== Discography ==
- Pray Me A Shadow (self released, 2004)
- A Bundled Bundle of Bundles (self released, 2006)
- Faces in the Rocks (Grass Roots Records, 2007)
- Two Tongues at One Time/Buried in Teeth 7" (Grass Roots Records, 2007)
- Gift for the End (Almost Musique Records, 2012)
- Bonnie & Mariee (Spiritual Pajamas, 2012)
- Grief in Exile (Night Bloom Records, 2019)
- Circle of Signs (Self released, 2023)
