= Opium Moon =

American new-age music group

- Origin: Los Angeles, California, United States
- Genres: New-age music
- Members: Hamid Saeidi; Lili Haydn; MB Gordy; Itai Disraeli
- Website: www.opiummoon.com

Opium Moon is a new-age musical ensemble based in Los Angeles, California, United States. Its members are santurist Hamid Saeidi, violinist Lili Haydn, percussionist MB Gordy and bass guitarist Itai Disraeli. Persian poet Hafez's work influenced its musical improvisation style.

== History ==
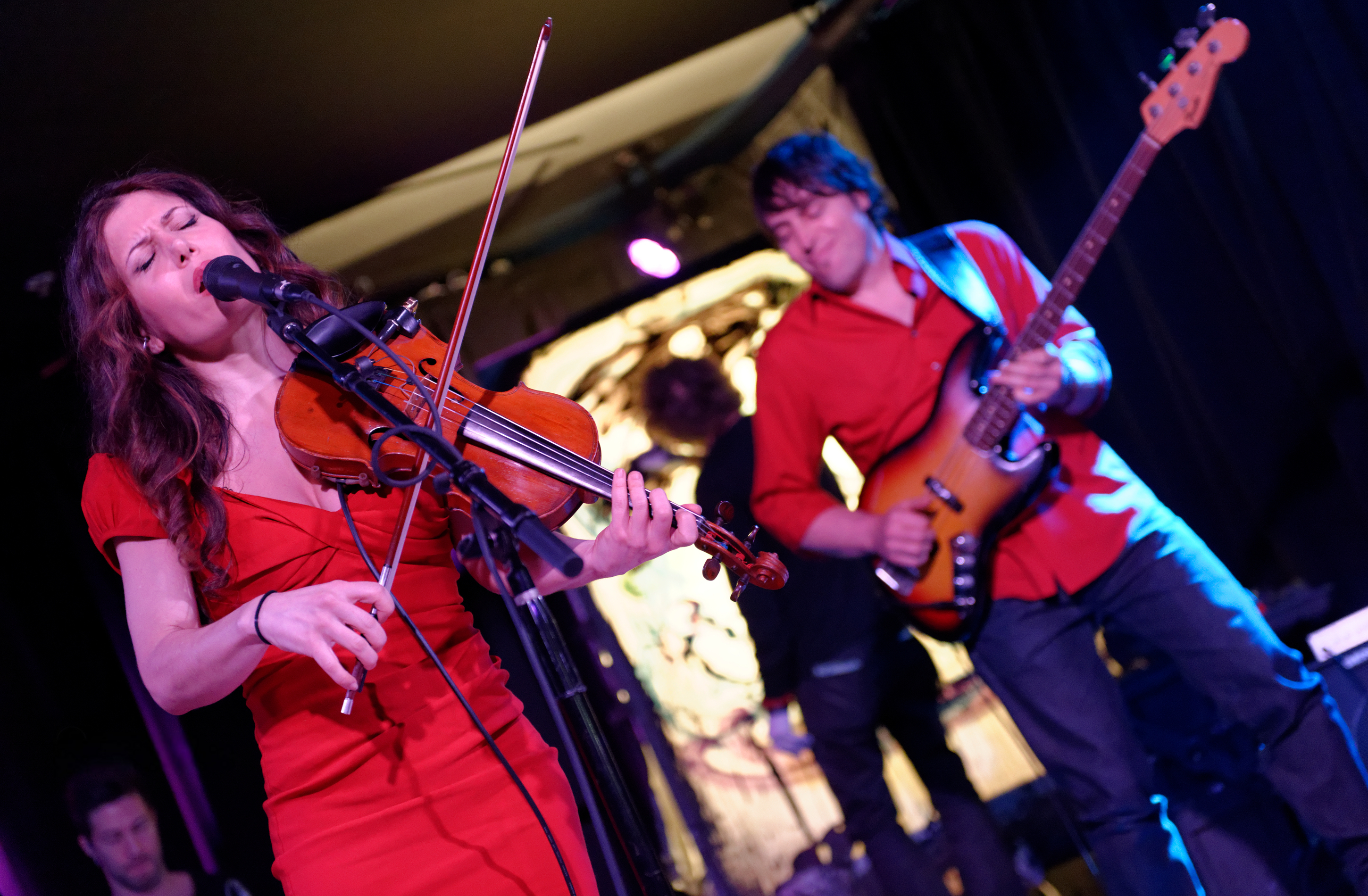
Lili Haydn and Itai Disraeli performing in 2014

In an interview with San Francisco Classical Voice, Lili Haydn spoke about why she formed Opium Moon with Itai Disraeli following Donald Trump's victory in the 2016 U.S. presidential election:

When Trump got elected, I stopped feeling like words mattered. I got very depressed and rather than speaking about there being peace in the world — inclusion, reconciliation, and compassion — that’s when I created Opium Moon with Itai rather than speaking about it. I needed space because I felt like I’d said everything I had to say, so I turned my attention to Opium Moon and scoring projects.

In 2018, Opium Moon released their eponymous debut album through Be Why Music. Steven Mirken in the Jewish Journal wrote that "Touches of jazz, rock, Middle Eastern and African sounds flit about" in their music, "but it never settles on a specific sound"; Priya Pathiyan in Hindustan Times called it "bliss inducing" and "so eclectic, it’s hard to categorise". The album later received the Grammy Award for Best New Age Album at the 61st Annual Grammy Awards.

Their second album Night + Day (2021) is composed of two song cycles, with six songs each, that model the passage of time in a day. Strings magazine praised the group's "silky and sensual" sound in their review of the album, as well as Gordy's "treasure trove" of Middle East percussion and Haydn's electrical violin. Night + Day was nominated for the same award for the 64th Annual Grammy Awards in 2022.

== Musical style and influences ==
The name Opium Moon and the group's "organic" improvisational style are inspired by the work of the Persian poet Hafez.

Three of the group's members are immigrants—from Iran, Israel, and Canada. According to Haydn, the global refugee crisis is an issue that is personally important to each of them; the song "Caravan" from their debut album is inspired by the immigrants they see in the news and through daily life.

== Discography ==
- Opium Moon (Be Why Music, 2018)
- Night + Day (2021)
