= Meditations (William Ackerman album) =

Studio album by William Ackerman
- Released: 2008
- Genre: New-age

William Ackerman chronology
Returning (2004)	Meditations (2008)	New England Roads (2010)

Meditations Is the Eleventh studio album By William Ackerman. The album was nominated for Best New Age Album at the 51st Annual Grammy Awards (Held on February 8, 2009).

== Track listing ==
1. "The Bricker's Beautiful Daughter"-4:20
2. "ZuZu's Petals"-4:50
3. "Believing in Miracles"-4:32
4. "Visiting"-6:06
5. "Up There Throughout the Skies"-6:24
6. "Was It This Lifetime"-5:50
7. "The Impending Death of the Virgin Spirit"-6:48
8. "Pictures"-5:04
9. "On One Knee"-4:01
10. "When the Moon Sings"-6:15
11. "Anne's Song"-3:56
12. "Hawk Circle"-5:01
13. "West of Shoshone"-4:04
14. "Processional"-5:02

== Awards and nominations ==
Year	Award	Result
2010	51st Grammy Best New Age Album	Nominated
