= Gary K. Michelson =

American surgeon and philanthropist (born 1949)

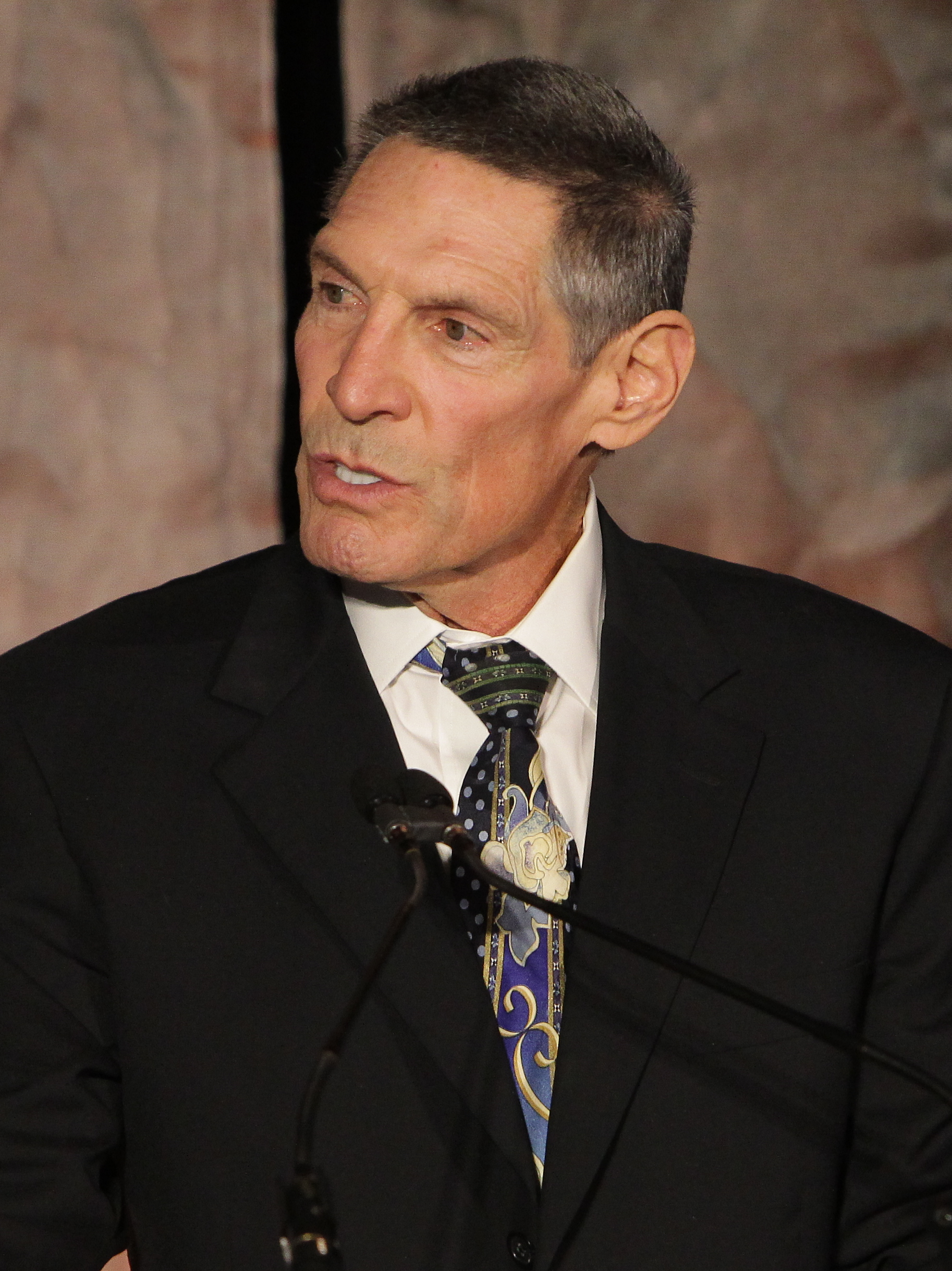
- Michelson in 2016
- Born: January 14, 1949 (age 77); Philadelphia, Pennsylvania, U.S.
- Education: Temple University; Hahnemann Medical College
- Occupations: Orthopedic Surgeon; Medical Scientist; Philanthropist
- Spouse: Alya Michelson
- Children: 3

Gary K. Michelson (born January 14, 1949) is an American orthopedic surgeon, medical inventor, and billionaire philanthropist.

== Early life and education ==
Michelson and his three brothers were raised in Philadelphia by his mother and grandmother, whose struggles with syringomyelia inspired his interest in spinal ailments. After graduating Central High School of Philadelphia in 1966, he attended Temple University and Hahnemann Medical College of Drexel University, until finishing his medical residency in orthopedic surgery at Hahnemann Medical Hospital in 1979. Michelson then completed his fellowship training in spinal surgery at St. Luke's Medical Center, in a joint program between Baylor College of Medicine and the University of Texas. He was a practicing spinal surgeon for over 25 years before retiring from private practice in 2001 to focus on philanthropy.

== Medical innovations ==
Seeing the low success rates associated with spinal surgery procedures early in his career, Michelson developed new implants, instruments and procedures for spinal surgery. These technologies, often recognized in the medical profession as "Michelson Devices", assist in surgical procedures by decreasing blood loss, incision size, and addressing other critical factors. Michelson is the sole credited inventor on over 950 issued or pending patents worldwide related to the treatment of spinal disorders.

In 2005, Michelson sold many of his spine-related patents to Medtronic for $1.35 billion, placing him on the Forbes 400 list. A legal battle with Medtronic over the origins of the patents preceded the sale. In 2004, Michelson cross-filed in response to Medtronic's 2001 suit, and was awarded financial damages for both lawsuits by the jury. The legal defense against Medtronic's suit established a major legal precedent in 2004, governing who bears the cost of pre-trial discovery of electronic evidence.

== Philanthropy ==
The Gary Karlin Michelson, M.D. Charitable Foundation, Inc. was founded in 1995 through a $100 million contribution from Michelson. It was renamed the Michelson Medical Research Foundation in 2005. The nonprofit does not accept donations.

Michelson and his wife, Alya, are founding donors of the National Medal of Honor Museum.

=== Michelson Center for Public Policy ===
The Michelson Center for Public Policy endorsed a 2021 bill from U.S. representative for Florida's 16th congressional district Vern Buchanan to end an FDA requirement that animal testing be used to determine a drug's efficacy on humans.

=== Michelson Found Animals Foundation ===
In 2005, Michelson launched the Found Animals Foundation, a 501(c)(3) private operating foundation dedicated to animal welfare. In response to Hurricane Katrina, the foundation created the Found Animals Registry, the first free national pet microchipping registry. Found Animals also performs surveys of pet owners, to study industry trends and owner/pet relationships.

In 2008, the foundation launched the Michelson Prize and Grants in Reproductive Biology, a $75 million initiative to create a safe and effective single-dose, non-surgical spay/neuter method for cats and dogs. The program includes the $25 million Michelson Prize, and an additional $50 million provided by Michelson to fund medical research in support of the prize. To date, the program has awarded 41 grants, including a gene therapy approach that could keep potentially keep felines kitten-free for almost two years.

In 2021, the Found Animals Registry was acquired by Pethealth Inc. (a subsidiary of Fairfax Financial). The foundation is also on the board of the Best Friends Animal Society's No-Kill Los Angeles initiative.

For World Spay Day 2024, the foundation donated $1 million to Community Animal Medicine Project clinics in Southern California. In October 2024, recognized for his work in animal welfare, Michelson was among the group of honorees at the Malibu Sunset Soirée For Animals event. In the same month, the Community Animal Medicine Project (CAMP) hosted the Pet Gala where Los Angeles Mayor, Karen Bass, presented the Michelsons with the Pioneer Award.

The Pet-Inclusive Housing Initiative, launched by Michelson Found Animals and the Human Animal Bond Research Institute (HABRI), aims to educate and advocate for legislation that removes barriers for pet owners in housing.

==== Better Neighbor Project ====
In 2020, the foundation launched the Better Neighbor Project to support low-income and homeless pet owners with food and veterinary services.

In January 2025, Michelson Found Animals, in partnership with Greater Good Charities, received delivery of 17 tons of Purina dog food to their Inglewood Better Neighbor Project warehouse to support pet owners impacted by the California wildfires.

=== Michelson Institute for Intellectual Property ===
Dr. Michelson was a contributing author to the free 2016 textbook The Intangible Advantage: Understanding Intellectual Property in the New Economy, written for non-lawyers and undergraduate students to better understand patents, copyrights, and trademarks. In 2016, the new Michelson Institute for Intellectual Property was formed to provide free intellectual property-related educational resources.

=== Michelson Medical Research Foundation ===
Formed in 2005, the Michelson Medical Research Foundation aims to promote innovation in medicine and science. Its initiatives include the USC Michelson Center for Convergent Bioscience, the Institute for Protein Design at the University of Washington, and the California Institute of Immunology and Immunotherapy at the new UCLA Research Park, announced in January 2024.

In 2017 the Michelsons launched the Michelson Prize to support medically relevant research by scientists under the age of 36. The 2020 Michelson Prizes were awarded to Danika Hill, a research fellow at Australia's Monash University, and Michael Birnbaum, an assistant professor at MIT.

In 2024, through the Michelson Medical Research Foundation, the Michelsons gifted $120 million to help with the launch of the California Institute for Immunology and Immunotherapy which will be located in UCLA's Research Park. At Research!America’s 2025 Advocacy Awards, Michelson received the Gordon and Llura Gund Leadership Award, which honors significant contributions to health-related research and advocacy, in recognition of his work with the California Institute for Immunology and Immunotherapy.

=== Michelson Neglected Disease Initiative ===
In 2013, he became a principal supporter of the Sabin Vaccine Institute, giving birth to the Michelson Neglected Disease Vaccine Initiative to provide access to affordable treatments for tropical diseases.

=== Michelson 20MM Foundation ===
In 2011, Michelson created the Twenty Million Minds Foundation (named for the number of students enrolled in higher education in the United States), to make college more affordable by underwriting a library of free online textbooks. In 2016, Michelson publicly released a variety of intellectual property tools through the organization.

The Spark Grants platform was launched by 20MM in March 2019, designed to truncate the lengthy grant-funding process. The foundation partnered with California for the first California Digital Divide Challenge in 2020, offering a $1 million prize for the best proposal to expand broadband access in the state.

The Michelson 20MM Foundation has been a leading force in closing the digital divide through convenings and energetic advocacy. It brought together national leaders from government, industry, NGOs, and academia for a series of high-level meetings and commissioned research that ultimately resulted in the FCC adopting new rules to eliminate discrimination in access to internet services. Michelson 20MM Foundation released a Los Angeles study on internet service access for low income households now that the federal high speed internet subsidy has been terminated.

The Coalition for Humane Immigrant Rights (CHIRLA) won a grant for a community broadband project from the Michelson 20MM Foundation for $25k in 2024. In July 2024, the 20MM Foundation collaborated with the California State University system to launch the CSU Pregnant and Parenting Student Initiative.

== Legislative ==
Since 2017, Michelson has funded and successfully advanced various pieces of legislation. Those include:

- Proposition 38 to authorize California selling bonds to support immunotherapy research.
- A bill ending the practice of pet shops sourcing animals from out-of-state farms, and AB 485, a companion bill requiring all pet shops in California to source their animals from local shelters and rescue groups.
- The California Cruelty-Free Cosmetic Act, banning the sale of cosmetics tested on animals.
- The Circus Cruelty Prevention Act, banning the use of animals in California circus shows.
- California Law AB 1260, which ends the practice of commercial fur trapping, and bans the sale of products made from the hides from exotic animals. The bill was designed to thwart an attempt by others to allow the sale of alligator and crocodile products in the state.
- California Senate Bill 573, requiring shelters to microchip all reclaimed or adopted cats and dogs.
- California Law SB 990, which provides parolees with the opportunity to live, work or pursue an education outside of the county where they resided prior to incarceration.
- California Law AB 2881, which removes existing registration barriers at California-based community colleges and state universities, and increases awareness around availability of the California Special Supplemental Food Program for Women, Infants, and Children (WIC).
- The FDA Modernization Act 2.0, which includes provisions to modernize effective, humane animal testing.
- California Law AB 2458, otherwise known as the GAINS Act, which will address barriers that student parents face when working towards completing higher education.

== Personal life ==
Michelson lives in Los Angeles with his wife, Alya, and their three children.

In the December 2015 issue of Forbes magazine, Michelson was featured as one of "10 People with Big Ideas to Change the World".

== Published works ==
=== Academic books ===
- (2016) The Intangible Advantage: Understanding Intellectual Property in the New Economy (contributing author)

=== Selected articles ===
- (2020) "America's Needed Medical Revolution" - US News & World Report
- (2020) "Transform higher education - make textbooks free" - EdSource
- (2021) "To vaccinate our economy, boost support for the NIH" - Fortune
- (2021) "Microchipping your pets doesn't have to be expensive. Paying for registration is a scam." - USA Today
- (2022) "Accelerating the Pace of Innovation for the Greater Good" - Technology & Innovation, Vol. 22 No. 2
- (2022) "Let's help struggling students rather than benefiting textbook publishers" - EdSource (with Michelle Pilati)
- (2024) "Is India the Key to Ending the War in Ukraine?" - C-Suite Quarterly
- (2024) "Low-cost solution to L.A.'s animal shelter crisis" - Daily Breeze
- (2024) "Why We All Should Love the NIH and How We Can Make It Better" - Joomag

== Awards and honors ==
- Inducted into the National Inventors Hall of Fame in Washington, D.C., on May 4, 2011.
- Inducted into the National Academy of Inventors on March 7, 2014.
- 2015 - Albert. B Sabin Humanitarian Award, in recognition of his extraordinary philanthropy and commitment toward the control and elimination of neglected tropical diseases (NTDs).
- 2015 - Distinguished Achievement Award from B'nai B'rith International, for his commitment to philanthropy, humanitarian assistance, and community leadership.
- 2017 - Honorary Doctor of Humane Letters from the University of Southern California.
- 2017 - Innovation Award for Technology from the Los Angeles County Medical Association.
- 2018 - Visionary of the Year Award in Philanthropy from CSQ / C-Suite Quarterly Magazine.
- 2022 - Humanitarian Award Recipient, 22nd Annual Inner City Law Center Awards
- 2022 - IP Champion Award, Intellectual Property Owners Education Foundation
- 2024 - Tommy Lasorda Leadership Award from Milken Institute
- 2024 - Humanitarian Award, World Brain Mapping Foundation
