= Bhakti Without Borders =

Studio album by Madi Das
- Label: Kulimela Association
- Producer: Dave Stringer

Bhakti Without Borders is a Mantra Music charity album by Madi Das. It was released May 12, 2015 and nominated for a Grammy award that year in the "Best New Age Album" category. At the time, this was only the third kirtan album received this honor. Bhakti Without Borders was listed as one of the "10 Best Yoga Tunes of the Year" by Yoga Journal. It also ranked third in the "Top 20 Conscious Music Albums for 2015" competition by Soul Traveller.

In 2017 the track "Shri Radhe" (featuring Chaytanya) was included on a compilation album called "Sri Ma: Chants of Divine Mother," released by White Swan Records and the track "Bhaja Govindam" (featuring Jahnavi Harrison) was included on an Apple Music Yoga playlist.

Bhakti Without Borders blends melodies from the East Indian Bhakti tradition with the folk, bluegrass and country elements of traditional American and Irish music. Madi Das sings a duet with a different female vocalist on each track. Featured singers: Acyuta Gopi, Ananda-Amrita, Carmella Gitanjali Baynie, Chaytanya Nitai, Gaura Mani, Gaurangi, Jahnavi Harrison, Mallika Des Fours, Nalina Kaufman, Sudevi Devi Dasi & Tulsi Devi.

Being a charity album, all profits benefit underprivileged girls at the Sandipani Muni School in Vrindavan, India. As of December 2017, approximately $23,000 had been contributed to assist 43 girls for one year's education.

== Track listing ==
No.	Title	Length
1.	"Shri Radhe - featuring Chaytanya"	4:20
2.	"Jai Gurudev - featuring Tulsi Devi"	5:40
3.	"Maha Mantra - featuring Sudevi Dasi"	4:22
4.	"Jamuna Puline - featuring Acyuta Gopi"	6:08
5.	"Namoh Maha - featuring Gaurangi"	4:47
6.	"Jagannath - featuring Mallika Des Fours"	5:44
7.	"Narasinghadev - featuring Nalina Kaufman"	5:01
8.	"Radhe Jai - featuring Carmella Gitanjali Baynie & Ananda-Amrita"	3:28
9.	"Sita Ram - featuring Gaura Mani"	4:47
10.	"Bhaja Govindam - featuring Jahnavi Harrison"	4:46

== Personnel ==
- Madi Das: Lead Vocals
- Acyuta Gopi, Ananda-Amrita, Carmella Gitanjali Baynie, Chaytanya Nitai, Gaura Mani, Gaurangi, Jahnavi Harrison, Mallika Des Fours, Nalina Kaufman, Sudevi Devi Dasi & Tulsi Devi: Featured singers
- Dave Stringer: Guitar, Appalachian Dulcimer, Backing Vocals
- Patrick Richey: Tabla, Cajon, Ghatam, Rebolo, Dumbek, Tavil, Giro, Shakers
- Sheela Bringi: Harmonium, Bansuri
- Shree Shyam: Bass
- Matt Pszonak: Pedal Steel
- Tulsi Devi: Violin

Recorded, edited and mixed by Krishan. Mastered by Stefan Heger. All songs written and arranged by Madi Das and Dave Stringer.

The record label is Kulimela Association.

The album was produced by Dave Stringer.

Album Cover Art & Design: Evan Horback & Neha Agarwal.

== Reception ==
Grammy nominated Kirtan artist Jai Uttal raves about Bhakti Without Borders, "I love this CD! It's so full of light! A beautiful offering of heart, love, and soul."

The Bhakti Beat adds, "Pure joy on every track. Sweet, mellifluous, nectar..."

The Indian Eagle: "A euphoria that strikes strings of the heart and touches the depth of your soul."

Deva Premal: "Allow the beautiful voice and transcendent music of Madi Das to transport you, and support the education of young women in Vrindavan."

The Namaste Counsel: "This is the We Are The World for the Kirtan community and its global hues are inescapable."

Madhava Smullen for ISKCON News: "One of the catchiest Kirtan albums you're likely to hear. Immaculate production by Dave Stringer with some of the best musicians on the Kirtan scene."
