= Gregg Karukas =

American jazz pianist

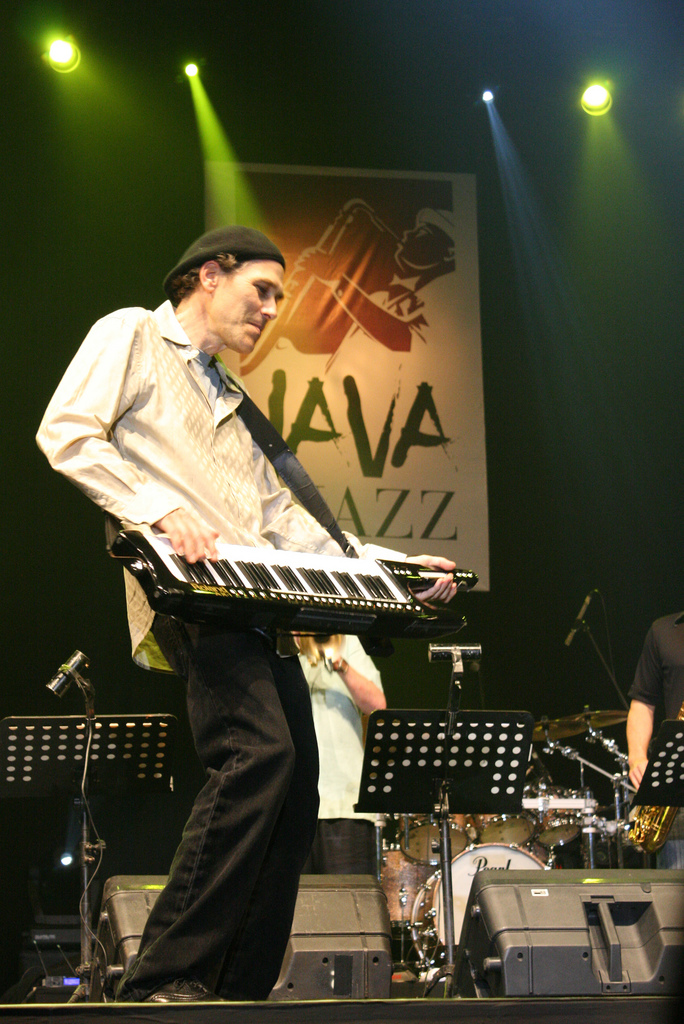
- Gregg Karukas at the Java Jazz Festival in 2008

Background information
- Origin: Washington, D.C.
- Genres: Smooth jazz, world music
- Occupations: Musician, songwriter, producer
- Instruments: Piano, keyboards
- Years active: 1975–present
- Labels: N-Coded, Nightowl
- Website: karukas.com

Gregg Karukas (born 1956) is a smooth jazz pianist from Bowie, Maryland who first gained notice in Washington, D.C., then moved to Los Angeles in 1982. He backed Melissa Manchester before he co-founded the Rippingtons in 1986.

He experimented with drums, guitar, trumpet, and keyboards as a child, but it was not until his teens that he pursued music professionally as a pianist, having played with the Bowie High School Starliners big band. When he was sixteen, he owned one of the first Minimoog synthesizers.

Karukas spent five years with Tim Eyermann in the band East Coast Offering. After moving to Los Angeles, he worked with Shelby Flint, David Benoit, Richard Elliot, Grant Geissman, Dave Koz, Ronnie Laws, and Melissa Manchester. He was a member of the Rippingtons when they recorded their first album, Moonlighting, in November 1985. He has worked as a sideman with Larry Carlton, Jeffrey Osborne, George Duke, Rick Braun, Brenda Russell, Craig Chaquico, Boney James, and Peter White.

Karukas has received multiple Best Keyboardist nominations at the Oasis and National Smooth Jazz Awards. He has collaborated with Brazilian composer Dori Caymmi and Ricardo Silveira. He produced, arranged, engineered, and co-wrote two albums with Omar Akram, whose Echoes of Love won the Grammy Award for Best New Age Album in 2013.

He owns and distributes most of his music on his label, Nightowl Records .

== Studio albums ==
Title	Year	Label
The Night Owl	1987	Nightowl
Key Witness	1990	Nightowl
Sound of Emotion	1992	Nightowl
Summerhouse	1993	Nightowl
Home for the Holidays	1993	Fahrenheit/Nightowl
You'll Know It's Me	1995	Nightowl
Blue Touch	1998	i.e./Polygram
Nightshift	2000	N2K
Heatwave	2002	N-Coded/Warlock
Looking Up	2005	Nightowl
GK	2009	Nightowl
Soul Secrets	2014	Nightowl
Serenata	2021	Nightowl
