= Omar Akram =

American music producer, composer and pianist

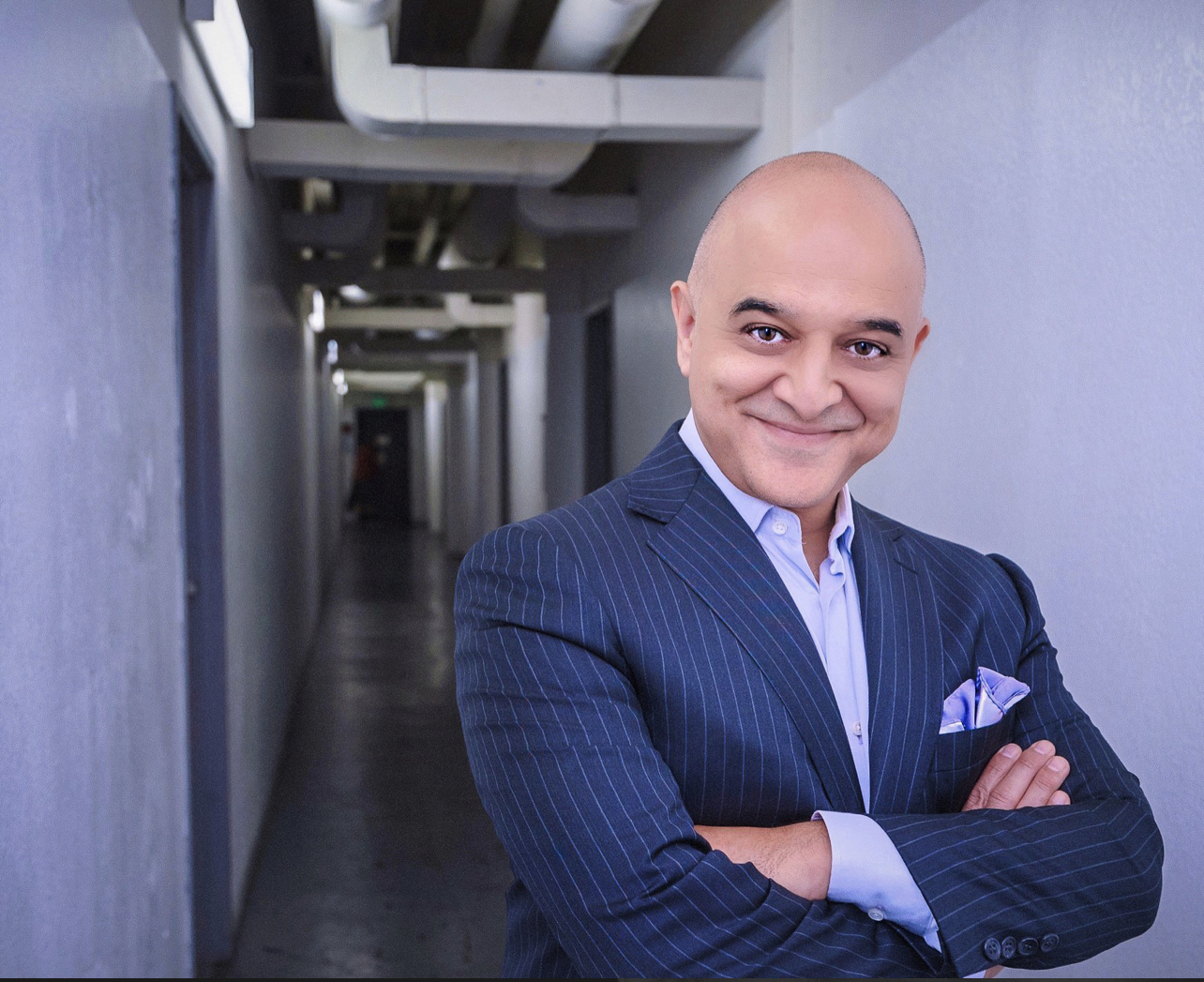

Background information
- Born: November 23, 1964 (age 61); New York City, U.S.
- Genres: New-age, Jazz, World music
- Instrument: Piano
- Years active: 2002–present
- Labels: Real Music, Twinbrook Entertainment
- Website: omarakram.com

Omar Akram (born November 23, 1964) is an Afghan-American producer, composer, and pianist. In 2013, he became the first Afghan-American to win a Grammy Award for Best New Age Album for his fourth studio album, Echoes of Love. Omar's most recent album release, Moments of Beauty, was nominated for Best New Age, Ambient or Chant album at the Grammy Awards in February 2024. He is also an inspirational writer who contributes to The Huffington Post.

== Early life ==
Akram was born in New York City on November 23, 1964. He grew up traveling around the world as the son of a United Nations diplomat living everywhere from Prague to Havana as well as his ancestral home of Afghanistan. He notably met Fidel Castro at the age of 14, who is said to have allowed him to sneak into the local Cuban jazz clubs, the sounds of which influenced his formative compositional style.

== Career ==
In 1993, Akram moved to Los Angeles where he performed in various Mainstream Top 40 bands while also writing his own music.

In 2002, he signed a recording deal with Real Music. His first commercial album release that same year, titled Opal Fire, reached Billboard's New Age Top 15 Chart that same year. His sophomore release Free As A Bird in 2004, produced and arranged by keyboardist Gregg Karukas, featured world class violinist Charlie Bisharat and Grammy Award-winning saxophonist Eric Marienthal. This album also reached Billboard's New Age Top 15 Chart that same year. In 2007, Secret Journey, produced, co-written and arranged by Gregg Karukas, also critically acclaimed, featured Ardeshir Farah. In 2012, Akram was nominated and won the Grammy Award for Best New Age Album for his album Echoes of Love, also produced, co-written and arranged by Gregg Karukas. This album was followed by Daytime Dreamer in 2013 which featured six new recordings along with tracks previously released from Opal Fire and Free As A Bird.

Akram's most recent album release "Destiny," co-produced with producer Walter Afanasieff, was independently released through his own company, Twinbrook Entertainment, on August 9, 2019. Afanasieff also contributes vocals to the first single release from the album, "Here I Am". An accompanying official music video was directed by Erik White. Shardad Rohani arranged and conducted the Slovak Radio Symphony Orchestra on two tracks. The album was mixed by four-time Grammy winner Dave Reitzas at Westlake Studios in Hollywood, CA.

Starting from the lockdown resulting from COVID-19 pandemic, Omar Akram has been producing a docu-series titled "Omar's Music Chamber, where he performed a number of songs in his previous albums, as well as some newly written music. " From this collection, Omar Akram released a new album, The Light Will Come, on April 23, 2021.

The Moments Of Beauty album was released on July 7, 2023. The album is animated by a spirit of reflection and contemplation that taps into personal cherished memories. As Omar notes, “it reminds me of my first album, Opal Fire, especially with its feeling of simplicity in the melodies and the simple truths they convey." Moments Of Beauty was nominated for Best New Age, Ambient or Chant album at the 66th Annual Grammy Awards in November 2023.

== Awards and honors ==
Grammy Award for Best New Age Album for Echoes of Love in 2014.

Grammy Nomination for Best New Age, Ambient or Chant Album for Moments Of Beauty in 2024.

== Discography ==
=== Opal Fire ===
Real Music (Album Release Date: September 3, 2002)

No.	Title	Composer	Length
1.	"Sugar Coated Love"	Omar Akram	4:38
2.	"Morning Rain"	Omar Akram	3:52
3.	"A Vision Of You"	Omar Akram	4:34
4.	"Last Dance"	Omar Akram	5:03
5.	"Waves Of Emotion"	Omar Akram	3:23
6.	"Farewell For Now"	Omar Akram	4:21
7.	"Unity"	Omar Akram	3:39
8.	"Innocence Lost"	Omar Akram	3:29
9.	"So Far"	Omar Akram	3:39
10.	"Gypsy Woman"	Omar Akram	3:53
11.	"Longing"	Omar Akram	3:19
12.	"Opal Fire"	Omar Akram	4:48

=== Free As A Bird ===
Real Music (Album Release Date: April 27, 2004)

No.	Title	Composer	Length
1.	"Free As A Bird"	Omar Akram	5:05
2.	"Passage Into Midnight"	Omar Akram	4:23
3.	"A Day With You"	Omar Akram	5:09
4.	"Falling Through The Rain"	Omar Akram	4:48
5.	"Beauty Unveiled"	Omar Akram	4:27
6.	"Dancing With The Wind"	Omar Akram	4:53
7.	"Surrender"	Omar Akram	6:42
8.	"Riding The Current"	Omar Akram	4:00
9.	"Never Let Go"	Omar Akram	3:35
10.	"Trust Unspoken"	Omar Akram	4:01
11.	"Flight Of Mystery"	Omar Akram	5:04

=== Secret Journey ===
Real Music (Album Release Date: September 25, 2007). Secret Journey peaked at #12 on Billboard's New Age Chart.

No.	Title	Composer	Length
1.	"Run Away With Me"	Omar Akram, Gregg Karukas	5:08
2.	"Secret Journey"	Omar Akram, Gregg Karukas	6:05
3.	"Nomadic Rhapsody"	Omar Akram, Gregg Karukas	3:37
4.	"Passage Of The Heart"	Omar Akram, Gregg Karukas	3:32
5.	"Gypsy Spirit"	Omar Akram, Gregg Karukas	4:28
6.	"Stargazers"	Omar Akram, Gregg Karukas	3:56
7.	"Seven Secrets"	Omar Akram, Gregg Karukas	4:47
8.	"Whispers In The Moonlight"	Omar Akram, Gregg Karukas	4:38
9.	"Mirage"	Omar Akram, Gregg Karukas	4:32
10.	"Shimmering Star"	Omar Akram, Gregg Karukas	4:41
11.	"Caravan"	Omar Akram, Gregg Karukas	4:35
12.	"Angel Of Hope"	Omar Akram, Gregg Karukas	3:30
13.	"Desert Flower (Bonus Track)"	Omar Akram, Gregg Karukas	4:05

=== Echoes Of Love ===
Real Music (Album Release Date: June 5, 2012). Echoes Of Love was awarded a Grammy for Best New Age Album.

No.	Title	Composer	Length
1.	"Echoes Of Love"	Gregg Karukas, Omar Akram	4:46
2.	"Take My Hand"	Gregg Karukas, Omar Akram	4:52
3.	"Lovely Day"	Gregg Karukas, Omar Akram	4:43
4.	"Miracle"	Gregg Karukas, Omar Akram	4:11
5.	"Finally Home"	Gregg Karukas, Omar Akram	4:15
6.	"Draw Me Close"	Omar Akram, Gregg Karukas	3:48
7.	"Free Spirit"	Gregg Karukas, Omar Akram	3:42
8.	"My Hope Is You"	Omar Akram, Gregg Karukas	3:33
9.	"Rejoice"	Gregg Karukas, Omar Akram	2:42
10.	"Cry For Love"	Gregg Karukas, Omar Akram	4:41
11.	"Open Skies"	Gregg Karukas	4:56
12.	"Merry"	Omar Akram	2:37

=== Daytime Dreamer ===
Real Music (Album Release Date: September 24, 2013)

No.	Title	Composer	Length
1.	"Downpour"	Omar Akram	4:16
2.	"Dancing With The Wind"	Omar Akram	4:52
3.	"Searching"	Omar Akram	3:59
4.	"Surrender"	Omar Akram	6:42
5.	"Passage Into Midnight"	Omar Akram	4:21
6.	"Daytime Dreamer"	Omar Akram	3:31
7.	"Love Of My Heart"	Omar Akram	3:39
8.	"The Promise"	Omar Akram	4:27
9.	"Morning Rain"	Omar Akram	3:53
10.	"The Last Dance"	Omar Akram	4:41
11.	"My Desire"	Omar Akram	3:30

=== Destiny ===
Twinbrook Entertainment (Album Release Date: August 9, 2019)

No.	Title	Composer	Length
1.	"Take Me Away"	Omar Akram	4:23
2.	"Destiny"	Omar Akram	4:01
3.	"My Promise To You"	Omar Akram	4:20
4.	"Nomad"	Omar Akram	4:22
5.	"Mystery Train"	Omar Akram	3:47
6.	"Coastal Drive"	Omar Akram	4:24
7.	"Lotus Flower"	Omar Akram	3:41
8.	"Celebrate New Life"	Omar Akram	3:41
9.	"Regenerate Love"	Omar Akram	3:57
10.	"Matters Of The Heart"	Omar Akram	3:56
11.	"Secret Place"	Omar Akram	4:30
12.	"Here I Am (featuring Walter Afanasieff)"	Omar Akram	4:46

=== The Light Will Come ===
Twinbrook Entertainment (Album Release Date: April 23, 2021)

No.	Title	Composer	Length
1.	"The Light Will Come"	Omar Akram	6:09
2.	"For George"	Omar Akram	8:29
3.	"Hear My Heart"	Omar Akram	7:10
4.	"For Merry"	Omar Akram	4:36
5.	"Waterfall"	Omar Akram	5:17
6.	"Since I Met You"	Omar Akram	7:37
7.	"Wish I Could See You"	Omar Akram	6:43
8.	"Pressing On"	Omar Akram	4:30
9.	"Caught Dreaming"	Omar Akram	9:21
10.	"New Morning Sun"	Omar Akram	5:53

The second track of the album, For George, is dedicated to the memory of George Floyd.

=== Moments Of Beauty ===
Twinbrook Entertainment

(Album Release Date: July 7, 2023). Moments Of Beauty was nominated for Best New Age, Ambient or Chant album at the 66th Annual Grammy Awards in November 2023.

No.	Title	Composer	Length
1.	"Moments Of Beauty"	Omar Akram	3:27
2.	"Passage Of Time"	Omar Akram	3:24
3.	"Dancing On My Own"	Omar Akram	3:34
4.	"Sorrow"	Omar Akram	2:09
5.	"Falling In Love"	Omar Akram	3:25
6.	"Promises"	Omar Akram	3:50
7.	"Special Gift"	Omar Akram	3:22
8.	"Mystery"	Omar Akram	4:35
9.	"Someday"	Omar Akram	3:13
10.	"Walking Free"	Omar Akram	4:01
