= The Nightowl =

Studio album by Gregg Karukas
- Released: 1987
- Genre: Jazz fusion
- Label: Optimism

Gregg Karukas chronology
The Nightowl (1987)	Key Witness (1990)

The Nightowl is the debut studio album by American jazz pianist Gregg Karukas. It was released in 1987.

== Track listing ==
1. "Drive Time"
2. "Lady in my Heart"
3. "Walkin' with You"
4. "Alena"
5. "The Nightowl"
6. "Calypso Dance"
7. "Magic Cat"
8. "Talbot Street Cafe"
9. "C.I. to the Eye"

== Personnel ==
- Gregg Karukas – piano
- Jay Dulaney – electric bass
- Ken Navarro – electric guitar
- Gary Meek – saxophone
- Steve Samuel - percussion, timbals
- Jeff Pescetto - vocals
