= Homage to Kindness =

Studio album by David Darling
- Released: May 10, 2019
- Label: Valley

Homage to Kindness is a studio album by David Darling, released on May 10, 2019. The album received a Grammy Award nomination for Best New Age Album.
