= Michelson Prize and Grants in Reproductive Biology =

Initiative to create a nonsurgical sterilant for male and female cats and dogs

The Michelson Prize and Grants in Reproductive Biology Program is a $75 million (USD) initiative to create a safe and effective, single-dose, nonsurgical sterilant for male and female cats and dogs. It includes a $25 million (USD) prize for the first entity to develop a product that meets a series of criteria, which include: a single-dose, permanent, nonsurgical sterilant; safe and effective in male and female cats and dogs, ablates sex steroids and/or their effects, suitable for administration in a field setting, viable pathway to regulatory approval, and reasonable manufacturing process and cost. The program has also committed up to $50 million (USD) in grant funding for promising research in pursuit of a sterilant that meets these criteria. To date, $19 million has been awarded to 41 research projects worldwide, including a 2023 study on durable anti-Mullerian hormone treatments for female cats.

== History ==
The prize was established in October 2008 by Michelson Found Animals Foundation, a 501(c)(3) non-profit organization funded by inventor, philanthropist, and retired orthopedic surgeon Dr. Gary K. Michelson. The prize seeks to make sterilization for cats and dogs accessible and affordable worldwide through a high-volume, low-profit model.

Michelson Found Animals Foundation also offers Michelson Grants, up to $250,000 per year for up to three years, to fund research for sterilization technology.

== See also ==
- List of biology awards
