= Jahnavi Harrison =

British musician

Jahnavi Jivana dasi
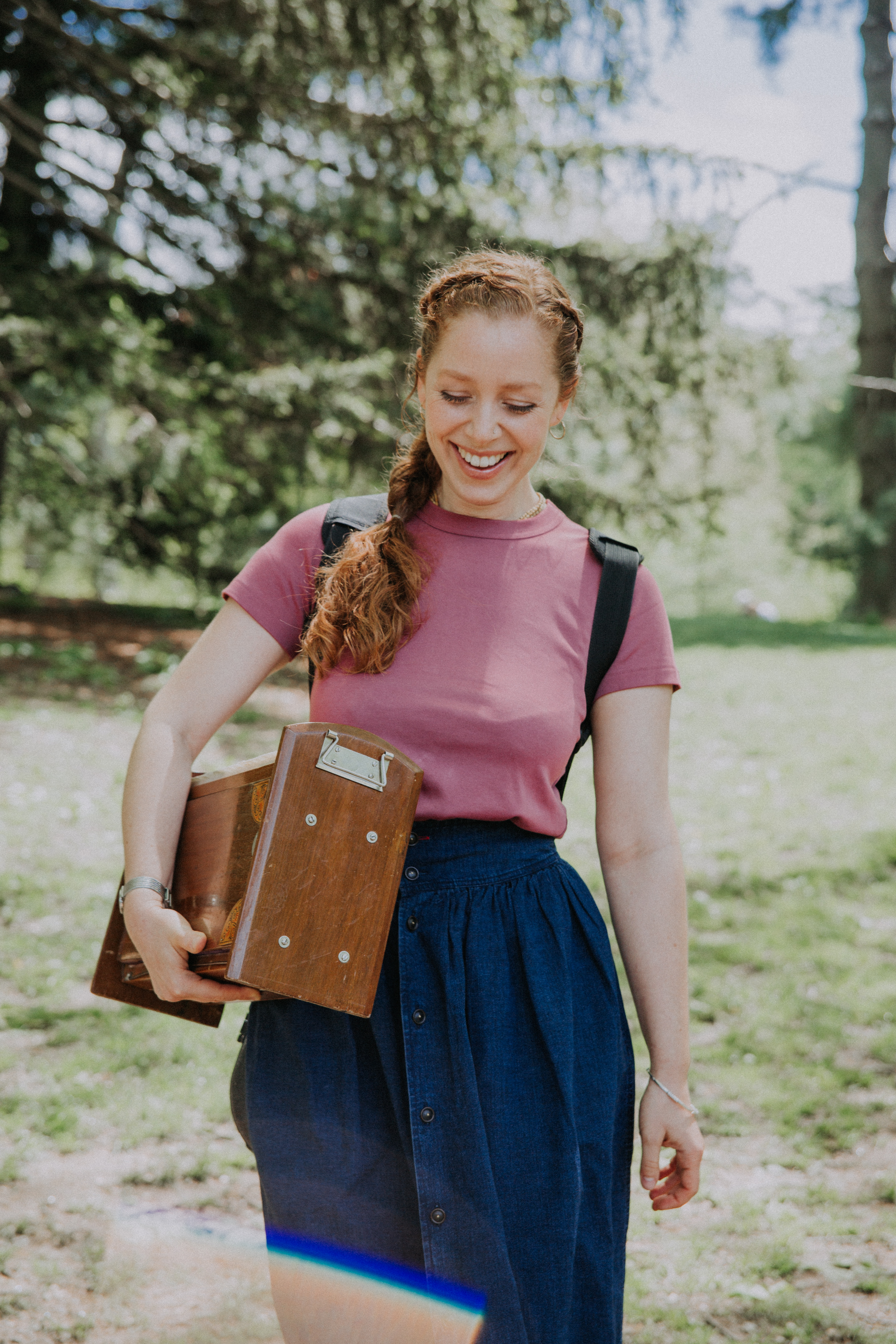
- Jahnavi Harrison in 2019
- Other name: Jahnavi Harrison
- Education: Linguistics and Creative Writing
- Alma mater: Middlesex University
- Known for: meditation music performer co-founded "Kirtan London"

Jahnavi Harrison, also known by her spiritual name, Jahnavi Jivana dasi, is a British musician known for her Hindu mantra meditation music (kirtan). She regularly appears as a presenter on BBC Radio 4's Something Understood programme and BBC Radio 2's Pause for Thought. She received her first Grammy nomination for the 2026 awards.

== Biography ==
Jahnavi Harrison was raised in a family of Bhakti-yoga practitioners at Bhaktivedanta Manor. She states that she aims to channel her creative expression as a musician as a path to self-realisation and service. She is trained in both Indian (Carnatic music and Bharatanatyam) and Western music, as well as dance, writing and visual arts. She gained a bachelor's degree in Linguistics and Creative Writing from Middlesex University in 2009. Since then she has presented and taught mantra music and meditation globally. She released her debut album, Like a River to the Sea in July 2015, and was featured on the Grammy-nominated Bhakti Without Borders charity album (2016). She presents regularly on broadcast media, including for BBC Radio 2's "Pause for Thought" and "Something Understood" on BBC Radio 4. She co-founded "Kirtan London", a project that aims to make mantra music accessible and relevant to a wider audience through a variety of events and retreats.

== Recordings ==
=== Like a River to the Sea ===
Harrison released her debut album, Like a River to the Sea in July 2015.

=== Bhakti Without Borders ===
Harrison features on "Bhaja Govindam" for the charity album Bhakti Without Borders, which was nominated for a Grammy Award in 2015.

=== Mantra Lounge Volumes 1, 2 & 3 ===
Harrison has recorded tracks for Mantra Lounge Volumes 1, 2 & 3.

=== Surrender (Krishna Keshava) ===
Willow Smith and Harrison present a unique, first-time collaboration. Surrender (Krishna Keshava) is an ancient sacred song from India. The Sanskrit lyrics invoke divine peace, protection, and grace. Harrison shared the release exclusively with Zoe Ball on BBC Radio 2.

=== R I S E ===
In 2020, she released the EP R I S E, with Willow Smith. Wonderland magazine described it as "a[n] idyllic garden surrounded by angelic ethereal vocals and shimmering productions", with "birds chirping sweetly over melodic guitar strings".

=== Into The Forest ===
In 2024, she released the album Into The Forest. For the 2026 Grammy Awards, her album was nominated under the category The Best New Age, Ambient or Chant Album.

== Reception ==
McKenna Rowe, reviewing Like a River to the Sea for LA Yoga, wrote that she was "moved and stunned by the beauty of the instruments and arrangements" of the songs. She found the album "a deeply satisfying masterpiece", not only for people who like devotional music. Reviewing the album for Pulse magazine, Sanjeevini Dutta noted that kirtan was "the sound track" to Harrison's childhood. She called it "a first album of astonishing ripeness and sweetness," one that drew the listener "to a profound inner space," yet staying in contact with "life lived full of joys, sorrow and heartbreak." Amardeep Dhillon, in Songlines magazine, called the music pleasant but unsurprising, the tracks being "soothing and uncluttered, with Harrison's violin weaving in between Celtic and Karnatic strains". In his view the album succeeds through the undoubted "depth of feeling, sincerity and love that come through".
