= Dancing on Water =

Studio album by Peter Kater
- Released: September 1, 2017
- Genre: New-age
- Label: Point of Light Records
- Producer: Peter Kater

Dancing on Water is an album by Peter Kater, released on September 1, 2017. It earned Kater a Grammy Award for Best New Age Album at the 60th Annual Grammy Awards (2018).
