= Returning (album) =

Compilation album by William Ackerman
- Released: September 28, 2004
- Genre: Chamber jazz, new age
- Length: 51:19
- Label: Decca Records
- Producer: William Ackerman, Corin Nelsen, Chris Roberts

William Ackerman chronology
Hearing Voices (2002)	Returning (2004)	Meditations (2008)

Returning is a compilation album by William Ackerman, released in September 2004 through the record label Decca. In 2005, the album earned Ackerman the Grammy Award for Best New Age Album.

== Track listing ==
1. "The Bricklayer's Beautiful Daughter" - 4:18
2. "Anne's Song" - 3:56
3. "The Impending Death of the Virgin Spirit" - 6:16
4. "Pictures" - 5:09
5. "Hawk Circle" - 5:06
6. "Barbara's Song" - 5:06
7. "Unconditional" - 2:36
8. "Visiting" - 5:46
9. "Processional" - 5:00
10. "In a Region of Clouds" - 4:22
11. "Last Day at the Beach" - 5:04

== Personnel ==
- William Ackerman – composition, acoustic guitar, liner notes, production
- Penny Bennett – art direction
- Micaela Boland – cover design
- Laura A. A. Johnson – package coordination
- Bob Ludwig – mastering
- Corin Nelsen – engineering, production
- Chris Roberts – executive production
- Thanne Tangel – package coordination
- Irene Young – photography
