= Wings (Peter Kater album) =

Studio album by Peter Kater
- Released: August 30, 2019
- Genre: New-age
- Length: 45:12

Wings is a studio album by Peter Kater, released in 2019.

The album received a Grammy Award for Best New Age Album.
