= Grief in Exile =

Studio album by Mariee Sioux
- Released: June 7, 2019
- Recorded: Spring 2018 in Bolinas, Nevada City and Los Angeles, California, U.S.
- Genre: Folk
- Length: 37:55
- Label: Night Bloom Records
- Producers: Mariee Sioux, Kacey Johansing, Tim Ramsey

Mariee Sioux chronology
Bonnie & Mariee (2012)	Grief in Exile (2019)

Grief in Exile is the seventh solo album by the American folk musician Mariee Sioux, released on June 7, 2019 by Night Bloom Records.

== Track listing ==
Professional ratings
Review scores
Source	Rating
Exclaim!	4/5 stars
Soundblab	4.5/5 stars

All tracks are written by Mariee Sioux

No.	Title	Length
1.	"Black Snakes"	5:51
2.	"Baby Wave"	3:14
3.	"Goose Song"	2:27
4.	"Never Known"	2:04
5.	"Grief in Exile"	3:57
6.	"Behind the Veil"	2:22
7.	"Snow Knows White"	5:30
8.	"Coyote with the Flowering Heart"	4:01
9.	"Love Like Water"	2:53
10.	"My Birds"	5:36
Total length:		37:55
