= Michelson Medical Research Foundation =

U.S. nonprofit organization

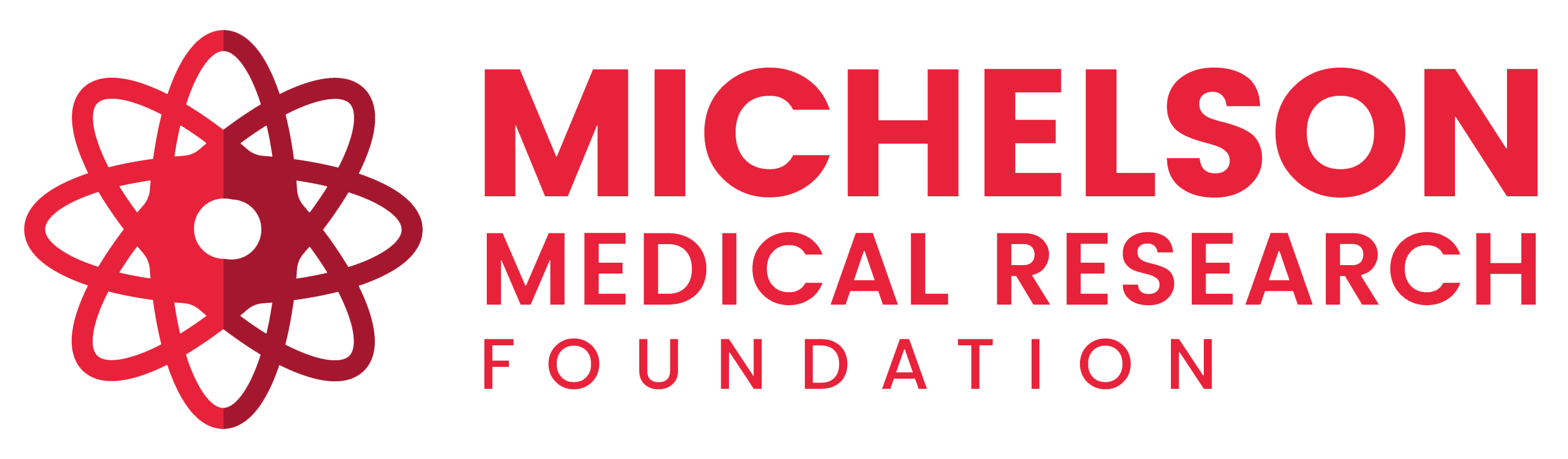
- Formation: 2005; 21 years ago
- Founder: Gary K. Michelson
- Headquarters: Los Angeles, California
- Award: Michelson Prizes
- Website: https://www.michelsonmedicalresearch.org/

The Michelson Medical Research Foundation is a private, non-profit philanthropy founded by orthopedic spinal surgeon and inventor Gary K. Michelson. The foundation aims to solve global health issues by promoting the development of innovative ideas in medicine and bioscience.

The foundation's co-chairs are Dr. Michelson and his wife, Alya Michelson.

== History ==
The Michelson Medical Research Foundation was founded in 2005 and seeded with $100 million.

In 2017, the foundation, along with the Human Vaccines Project, established the Michelson Prizes: Next Generation Grants, a $20 million initiative to advance innovation in the field of vaccines and immunotherapies through grants. The inaugural winners of the $150,000 awards in June 2018 included the University of Melbourne's Dr. Laura Mackay, Monash University's Dr. Patricia Illing, and Stanford University School of Medicine's Dr. Ansuman Satpathy. 2022 grant winners included Dr. Noam Auslander and Dr. Brittany Hartwell of the University of Minnesota. The 2022 Michelson Philanthropies & Science Prize for Immunology was awarded to Dr. Paul Bastard. Dr. Siyuan Ding of Washington University in St. Louis, Weill Cornell Medicine's Dr. Claire Otero, and Rockefeller University's Dr. Dennis Schaefer-Babajew were the Next Generation Grant winners of 2023.

2019 Next Generation Grant winners Dr. Murad Mamedov and Dr. Avinash Das Sahu collaborated on a study, published in August 2023, to identify how gamma-delta T cells recognize and destroy cancer cells.

2024 Next Generation Grant winner Dr. Omar Abudayyeh, along with Jonathan Gootenberg are developing RNA-editing tools, focusing on a set of enzymes called adenosine deaminases (ADARs) that bind to double-stranded RNA molecules and alter the letters of its genetic code. The $150,000 grant is funding Dr. Abudayyeh's effort to deliver tumor-specific therapies directly to cancerous cells while minimizing potential side effects and maximizing efficacy.

Alongside FEMA, UCLA Research Park, future home of the California Institute for Immunology and Immunotherapy, was converted into a disaster relief center in January 2025 to support those affected by the wildfires.

== Initiatives ==
- The USC Michelson Center for Convergent Bioscience: Inaugurated on November 1, 2017, The USC Michelson facility—the largest research building located at the University of Southern California—provides a revolutionary environment for collaborative research.
- The Michelson Entrepreneurship Award seeks to drive technological innovation in healthcare at the Wharton Startup Challenge.
- The Michelson Ethical Research & Education Initiative: a partnership between the Michelson Medical Research Foundation and the Physicians Committee for Responsible Medicine aimed at ending the use of dogs and other animals in medical education and various types of medical research such as alcohol abuse research, heart failure research.
- The California Institute of Immunology and Immunotherapy at the new UCLA Research Park, announced in January 2024. The Michelson Medical Research Foundation gifted $120 million to the project in August 2024 to establish two research entities within the Institute and provide research grants to students.

== Beneficiaries ==
Beneficiaries of the Michelson Medical Research Foundation include:

- The Human Vaccines Project.
- The Physicians Committee for Responsible Medicine.
- The University of Southern California.
- The University of Washington.
- The Wharton School of the University of Pennsylvania.
