= White Sun II =

Studio album by White Sun
- Released: August 26, 2016
- Length: 51:49
- Label: Be Why

White Sun II is an album by the band White Sun . It won Best New Age Album at the 59th Annual Grammy Awards in 2017.

== Track listing ==
1. "Gobinday Mukunday"
2. "Ajai Alai"
3. "Chattra Chakkra Varti"
4. "Simro Gobind"
5. "Suniai"
6. "Aap Sahaee Hoa Har Har Har"
7. "Dhan Dhan Ram Das Gur"
8. "Akal Instrumental"
9. "Akal"
10. "Hummee Hum"
11. "Ik Ardas Wahe Guru"
