= Mystic Mirror =

2022 album by White Sun

Studio album by White Sun
- Released: 2022

Mystic Mirror is an album by White Sun, released in 2022. The album earned a Grammy Award for Best New Age, Ambient or Chant Album.
