= USC Michelson Center for Convergent Bioscience =

Coordinates: 34.022069°N 118.289167°W

The USC Michelson Center for Convergent Bioscience is a building at the University of Southern California. The center is the largest building on the University Park campus and provides 190,000 square feet of laboratories and office space.

The center houses research groups from both the USC Dornsife College of Letters, Arts and Sciences and the Viterbi School of Engineering, including groups led by USC Provost Professor of Biological Sciences and Chemistry Raymond C. Stevens and USC Dean's Professor of Biological Sciences Peter Kuhn.

Construction of the building began in 2014 and was completed in 2017 at an anticipated total cost of over $100 million, $50 million of which has been donated by the building's namesake Dr Gary K. Michelson through the Michelson Medical Research Foundation.
