= Zamora (pianist) =

- Born: July 13, 1979 (age 46)
- Origin: Caracas, Venezuela
- Genres: Instrumental, new-age
- Occupations: Pianist, composer and writer
- Instruments: Synthesizer, piano, keyboard
- Labels: Z-Records
- Website: http://www.alejandrozamora.com

Alejandro Jose Zamora Moya, (born July 13, 1979) known professionally as Zamora, is a Venezuelan musician. Two of his albums have been nominated for Grammy Awards for Best New Age Album: Instrumental Oasis, Vol. 4 in 2010 and Instrumental Oasis, Vol. 6 in 2011.

He has recorded several instrumental and solo piano albums.

His music has been featured in several album compilations titled “Sounds From The Circle”, created by Suzanne Doucet.

His self-published book Pensamientos, Proverbios y Reflexiones (Thoughts, Proverbs and Reflections) was released in 2009. He has also published several books with the scores for his music compositions.

He lives in Los Angeles and Venezuela.

== Official releases ==
=== Bibliography ===
- Zamora (December 2008). Thoughts, Proverbs, and Reflections. CreateSpace Independent Publishing Platform. ISBN 978-1-4495-9836-5.
- Zamora (2007). The Score Book of: Instrumental Oasis, Vol. 1. CreateSpace Independent Publishing Platform. ISBN 978-1-4505-1628-0.
- Zamora (2008). The Score Book of: Instrumental Oasis, Vol. 2. CreateSpace Independent Publishing Platform. ISBN 978-1-4505-1644-0.
- Zamora (2009). The Score Book of: Instrumental Oasis, Vol. 3. CreateSpace Independent Publishing Platform. ISBN 978-1-4505-1648-8.
- The Full Orchestra Score Book of: Instrumental Oasis, Vol. 1. ASIN B001TK9B2I.
- The Full Orchestra Score Book of: Instrumental Oasis, Vol. 2. ASIN B001TKCSIC.
- The Full Orchestra Score Book of: Instrumental Oasis, Vol. 3. ISMN 979-0-901674-06-6.

=== Discography ===
- Instrumental Oasis, Vol. 1 (CD)
- Instrumental Oasis, Vol. 2 (CD)
- Instrumental Oasis, Vol. 3 (CD)
- Instrumental Oasis, Vol. 4 (CD)
- Instrumental Oasis, Vol. 5 (CD)
- Instrumental Oasis, Vol. 6 (CD)
- Instrumental Oasis, Vol. 7 (CD)
- Instrumental Oasis, Vol. 8 (CD)
- Instrumental Oasis, Vol. 9 (CD)
- The Best of Zamora (CD)
- 0 Stress (CD)
- Solo Piano (CD)
- VOX (CD)

=== Videography ===
- Instrumental Oasis, Vol. 1 (DVD)
- Instrumental Oasis, Vol. 2 (DVD)
- Instrumental Oasis, Vol. 3 (DVD)
- Instrumental Oasis, Vol. 4 (DVD)
- Instrumental Oasis, Vol. 5 (DVD)
- Instrumental Oasis, Vol. 6 (DVD)
- Instrumental Oasis, Vol. 7 (DVD)
