= Cheryl B. Engelhardt =

- Genres: Classical, new age
- Occupations: Pianist; Composer; Performing artist; Speaker
- Instrument: Piano
- Website: www.cbemusic.com

Cheryl B. Engelhardt is an American Grammy-nominated singer, songwriter, composer, musician, speaker, and career coach. She released several albums as a pop music artist and then transitioned into New Age music. Many of her songs have been placed in TV shows and films. She has shared the stage with Seal, Elvis Costello, and Jason Mraz, among others, and has released seven albums. She is a film composer and has created jingles that were aired in national ad campaigns. As a music industry speaker, she has spoken on panels at SXSW, ASCAP EXPO, DIY Musician, Disc Makers, and Universities. Her coaching program, In the Key of Success provides career coaching for individuals, assisting them in attaining their goals.

Engelhardt composed, The Listening which was recorded by Donzaleigh Abernathy (Martin Luther King Jr.'s goddaughter) and Washington, DC–based activist and spoken word artist, Wes Felton. The recording premiered in People Magazine and was featured in Harper's Bazaar. Her album, The Passenger, was nominated for a Grammy Award for Best New Age, Ambient, or Chant Album in 2022. She, along with GEM and the Dallas String Quartet, got a nomination for the 2026 Grammy Awards for their album According To The Moon for the Best New Age, Ambient, or Chant Album category.

== Early life and education ==
Engelhardt grew up in Stamford, Connecticut, and attended Greenwich Academy where she studied music and participated in musical plays, graduating in 1998. She attended Cornell University where she earned a Bachelor's degree in Marine Biology and Music and later studied music orchestration at Juilliard. Engelhardt is a former scuba diver for the USGS doing water quality research.

== Career ==
Engelhardt is a singer, songwriter, composer, musician, speaker, music industry career speaker, and career coach. She began her music career as an advertising and film composer in NYC, creating jingles for national ad campaigns. She then pursued a career as a pop/rock singer/songwriter and had songs placed in television and film as well as touring internationally with her backing band. She transitioned into New-Age music and released the albums Luminary, A Seeker's Slumber, and The Passenger. Luminary was awarded Best New Age Music Album of 2020 by the New Age Music Guide.

Engelhardt collaborated with Sangeeta Kaur, Danaë Xanthe Vlasse, and Lili Haydn on The Passenger, which was recorded, mixed, and mastered by all women. The album was nominated for a Grammy Award for Best New Age, Ambient, or Chant Album in 2022.

Engelhardt was asked to compose a song by the Social Justice Choir she participated in, Voices 21C. Inspired by Martin Luther King Jr.'s 1967 speech, Beyond Vietnam: A Time To Break Silence, she composed, The Listening which was recorded by Donzaleigh Abernathy (Martin Luther King Jr.'s goddaughter) and Washington, DC–based activist and spoken word artist, Wes Felton. The recording premiered in People Magazine and was featured in Harper's Bazaar.

She is a music entertainment industry speaker, moderating panels at SXSW, ASCAP EXPO, DIY Musician, Disc Makers, universities, and others. Her coaching program, In the Key of Success provides career coaching for individuals, assisting them in attaining their goals.

Discography

- 2004 – Shoes Off and Run
- 2007 – Craving the Second
- 2011 – One Up
- 2015 – Inevitably
- 2020 – Luminary
- 2021 – Seeker's Slumber
- 2022 – The Passenger
