= Gentle Thunder =

American flautist

- Born: Lisa Carpenter; Kirkland, Washington, U.S.
- Origin: Memphis, Tennessee, U.S.
- Genres: New-age; Native American music
- Occupations: Musician; Composer
- Instruments: Native American flute; Hammered dulcimer; Percussion
- Years active: 1998–present
- Labels: GT Productions; Delvian Records
- Website: www.1gentlethunder.com

Gentle Thunder, born Lisa Carpenter, is an American player of Native American flute. She also plays the hammered dulcimer and percussion instruments.

Gentle Thunder is from Kirkland, Washington and has said she has Cree ancestry through her mother.

In 2006 she released Beyond Words with Will Clipman and Amochip Dabney, two musicians who back R. Carlos Nakai. The album was a 2007 Grammy nominee for Best New Age Album and was nominated at the 9th Native American Music Awards. She collaborated with singer-songwriter Mariee Siou on Siou's 2007 album, Faces in the Rocks.

Her fourth album, Opening the Gate, was nominated for Best Native American album at the 2007 NAR Lifestyle Music Awards.

She calls her flute "Blue Heron".

== Discography ==
- Awakening Remembrance. GT. 1998.
- Winds of the Heart. Delvian. 2005.
- Beyond Words. Delvian. 2006.
- Opening the Gate
