= White Sun (band) =

American new-age music group

- Origin: Los Angeles, CA, U.S.
- Genres: New-age; pop; electronica; world music
- Years active: 2015–present
- Members: Gurujas Khalsa; Harijiwan Khalsa
- Past members: Adam Berry
- Website: www.whitesun.com

YouTube information
- Channel: White Sun
- Genre: Music
- Views: 9.3 million
- Last updated: 19 November 2026

White Sun is a Grammy-winning American musical group. They are popular for blending different musical styles and genres. The duo comprises Gurujas Khalsa and Harijiwan Khalsa.

== Awards ==
Year	Nominated work	Category	Award	Result
2027	Tantrika	Best New Age, Ambient or Chant Album	Grammy	Nominated
2023	Mystic Mirror	Best New Age, Ambient or Chant Album	Grammy	Won
2016	White Sun II	Best New Age, Ambient or Chant Album	Grammy	Won

== Billboard album charts ==
Year	Work	Category	
Year	Work	Category	Billboard US
2015	White Sun	World	10
2016	White Sun II	New Age	1
2016	White Sun II	World	2

== Discography ==
- 2015 - White Sun
- 2016 - White Sun II
- 2018 - White Sun Gong
- 2018 - White Sun III
- 2021 - White Sun Sadhana
- 2022 - Mystic Mirror
- 2022 - Interpretation of Dreams: The Live Album
- 2023 - En Busca
- 2023 - Gong by White Sun
- 2025 - White Sun Christmas
- 2025 - Tantrika
