= Michael DeMaria =

Musical artist (born 1962)

- Born: Michael Brant DeMaria; April 23, 1962 (age 63); Norwalk, Connecticut, U.S.
- Genres: New Age, Ambient, Acoustic
- Occupation(s): Musician, psychologist, author
- Instrument(s): Aerophone, keyboards, percussion, voice
- Years active: 1982–present
- Labels: Ontos Music, Sounds True
- Website: www.michaeldemaria.com

Michael Brant DeMaria is an American psychologist, author, and musician.

== Music ==
DeMaria's album Siyotanka was released in January 2009 debuting at #2 on the Zone Music Chart, a music airplay tracking agency. It climbed to #1 on the Chart in February 2009. Siyotanka was composed as a soundtrack to a play by the same name co-written with Stephen C. Lott, Ph.D. and produced in 2008. It went on to win a Native American Music Award in October 2009 in the Native Heart category. Siyotanka was then nominated for a Grammy in December 2009 during the 52nd Grammy Awards. Siyotanka in March 2010 won the Zone Music Award for Best Native American Music Album of 2009.

DeMaria's album Ocean was released in November 2009 debuting at #1 on the Zone Music Chart. Ocean held this number one spot in December 2009 and January 2010 for a total of 3 months. Ocean went on to win Best Ambient Album of 2009 and Best Relaxation/Meditation Album of 2009 at the ZMR Music Awards. In December 2010 during the 53rd Grammy Awards, Ocean became DeMaria's second Grammy nomination this time for Best New Age Album of the Year.

DeMaria began composing Ocean after the hurricane seasons of 2004 and 2005 along the Gulf Coast where he and his family were displaced from their home following Hurricane Ivan. Ocean was the follow-up to his first release The River released in 2003 and the first in his Healing Sound Series.

In November 2010 DeMaria released the third album in the Ontos Healing Sound Project, Gaia which also became his third album to reach #1 on the Zone Music Chart which it did in December 2010.Gaia then went on to be nominated in 4 categories in the ZMR awards in February 2011 and in March 2011 went on to win ZMR Album of the Year for 2010 as well as ZMR World Music Album of the Year for 2010. In December 2011 during the 54th Grammy Awards, Gaia became DeMaria's third Grammy nomination, his second for Best New Age Album of the Year.

In January 2012 DeMaria released the fourth album in the Ontos Healing Sound Project, Bindu which also became his fourth album to reach #1 on the Zone Music Chart. Bindu held the number one spot on the chart for 2 months. In December 2012 during the 55th Grammy Awards, Bindu went on to be DeMaria's fourth Grammy nomination, and his third for Best New Age Album of the Year.

DeMaria was a contributing artist on the Grammy winning children's album, All About Bullies...Big and Small in the 54th Grammy Awards.

In the summer of 2011 DeMaria released a compilation of his music on the Sounds True Label under the title, In The Flow: Music for Emotional Healing. DeMaria's second release on the Sounds True Label in his Music for Emotional Healing came in the summer of 2012 entitled Solace. DeMaria's title track to his Grammy Nominated album Ocean was chosen by Eckhart Tolle for inclusion on his 2012 release Music for Inner Stillness.

Michael is a 2009 graduate of the Musicianship and Leadership program of Music for People.

== Psychologist and author ==
DeMaria graduated from the New College of Florida with a degree in philosophy and from the University of West Florida with a degree in psychology. He received a master's degree in psychology and a doctorate in clinical psychology, both from Duquesne University. He wrote his dissertation on the phenomenology of human emotions.

His books include Horns and Halos and Ever Flowing On; one book of poetry, Moments; and three plays which have been produced, Siyotanka, Café Mezzo, and The Maiden of Stonehenge. His work has examined the role of creativity on emotions, growth, and healing.

== Discography ==
- The River (2003), Ontos Music
- Siyotanka (2008), Ontos Music
- Ocean (2009), Ontos Music
- Gaia (2010), Ontos Music
- In The Flow (2011), Sounds True
- Bindu (2012), Ontos Music
- Solace (2012), Sounds True
- The Maiden of Stonehenge (2013), Ontos Music
- Heart of Silence (2015), Sounds True
- Ama (2018), Ontos Music

== Bibliography ==
Books

- Horns and Halos (Peter Lang Publishing, 1992)
- Ever Flowing On (Terra Nova Press, 2005)
- Peace Within (Ontos World Press, 2016)

Plays

- Cafe Mezzo (Loblolly Theatre Press, 2007)
- Siyotanka (Ontos World Press/PLT, 2008)
- The Maiden of Stonehenge (Ontos World Press/PLT, 2012)

Poetry

- Moments: Healing Poems for the Journey Home (Ontos World Press, 2008)
- When All Is Lost: Finding Heart in the Dark (Ontos World Press, 2020)

Articles

- DeMaria, M.B., Poetry and the Abused Child; Journal of Poetry Therapy, Vol. 5, No. 2 1991
- DeMaria, M.B., Cowden, T. C., The Effects of Client-Centered Group Play Therapy On Self Concept; International Journal of Play Therapy, 1, pp. 55–67 1992
- DeMaria, M.B., et al. Colors of Disaster: The Psychology of the Black Sun; The Arts in Psychotherapy, Vol. 23, No. 1 pp. 1–14, 1996
- DeMaria, M.B. Artuad and the Voice of Uncertainty, The Humanistic Psychologist, Vol. 19, No. 2 p. 207-216.
