= The Journey =

The Journey may refer to:

== Film ==
- The Journey (1942 film), or El viaje, an Argentine film
- The Journey (1959 film), an American drama starring Deborah Kerr, Yul Brynner, and Jason Robards about the Hungarian Revolution of 1956
- The Journey (1986 film) (German: Die Reise), a Swiss-German drama by Markus Imhoof
- The Journey (1987 film) or Resan, an 873-minute Swedish documentary by Peter Watkins
- The Journey (1995 film) or Safar, an Iranian film directed by Ali-Reza Raisian
- The Journey (1992 film) or El viaje, an Argentine film
- The Journey, a 1997 American film by Indian director Harish Saluja
- The Journey (2004 film) (Sancharam), an Indian Malayalam film by Ligy J. Pulleppally
- The Journey, a 2011 short film directed by Tharun Bhascker Dhaassyam
- The Journey (2014 Malaysian film), a Malaysian film directed by Chiu Keng Guan
- The Journey, a Greek film of 2014
- The Journey (2016 film), a British-Irish drama film
- The Journey (2017 film), an Iraqi drama film
- The Journey (2021 film), a Japanese-Saudi Arabian animated film

== Television ==
- The Journey (TV series), a Singaporean periodical television series spanning three seasons from 2013 to 2015
  - The Journey: A Voyage, 2013 season
  - The Journey: Tumultuous Times, 2014 season
  - The Journey: Our Homeland, 2015 season

=== Episodes ===
- "The Journey", Annie McGuire episode 8 (1988)
- "The Journey", Connected (2015) season 1, episode 14 (2015)
- "The Journey", Death Valley Days season 13, episode 24 (1965)
- "The Journey", Douglas Fairbanks Presents season 1, episode 24 (1953)
- "The Journey", Earth: Final Conflict season 5, episode 21 (2002)
- "The Journey", Gargoyles season 3, episode 1 (1996)
- "The Journey", Lassie (1954) season 2, episode 25 (1956)
- "The Journey (I–V)", Lassie (1954) season 9, episodes 19–23 (1963)
- "The Journey", Lawman season 1, episode 30 (1959)
- "The Journey", Raven (American) season 2, episode 3 (1993)
- "The Journey", Samurai 7 episode 10 (2004)
- "The Journey", Spyforce episode 38 (1973)
- "The Journey", Stoney Burke episode 32 (1963)
- "The Journey", Tales of Wells Fargo season 4, episode 20 (1960)
- "The Journey", The Dewarists season 3, episode 6 (2013)
- "The Journey", The Legend of Prince Valiant season 1, episode 2 (1991)
- "The Journey", The Listener season 1, episode 13 (2009)
- "The Journey", The O.C. season 3, episode 17 (2006)
- "The Journey", The Waltons season 2, episode 1 (1973)
- "The Journey", The Wonder Years season 4, episode 3 (1990)
- "The Journey", Transformers: Cyberverse season 1, episode 4 (2018)
- "The Journey", Voltron: Legendary Defender season 3, episode 5 (2017)
- "The Journey", Watership Down (2018) episode 1 (2018)
- "The Journey", Winners season 2, episode 6 (1990)
- "The Journey", Words and Pictures series 4, episode 8 (1977)
- "The Journey", Words and Pictures series 7, episode 6 (1984)

== Literature and art ==
- The Journey: A Fragment, a 1765 poem by Charles Churchill
- The Journey, a 1943 novel by Robert Paul Smith
- The Journey, a 1944 novel by Robert Eton
- The Journey, a 1954 novel by Lillian Smith
- The Journey, a 1962 novel by Dorothy Clarke Wilson
- The Journey (German: Die Reise), a 1977 novel by Bernward Vesper
- The Journey, a 1982 novel by Anne Cameron
- The Journey, a 1988 novel by John Marsden
- The Journey, a 1990 novel by Ida Fink about Jewish sisters in hiding during the Holocaust
- The Journey, a 1990 novel by Indira Ganesan
- The Journey, a 1993 non-fiction book by Kenneth Jernigan
- The Journey, a 1999 guide by Brandon Bays about self-healing soul and body and experiencing freedom
- The Journey (Animorphs), a 2000 novel in the Animorphs series by K. A. Applegate
- "The Journey" ("Jatra"), a 2001 short story by Mamoni Raisom Goswami; featured in the collection The Shadow of Kamakhya
- Guardians of Ga'Hoole: The Journey, a 2003 novel by Kathryn Lasky
- The Journey (installation), an art installation on the subject of human trafficking in the sex trade
- The Journey, the third volume of the comics series Age of Reptiles by Ricardo Delgado; published in 2009–10
- A Journey, initially titled The Journey, a 2010 memoir by Tony Blair
- The Journey (Steve Smith Book), a 2017 autobiography of Australian cricketer Steve Smith

== Music ==
=== Albums ===
- The Journey (911 album) or the title song (see below), 1997
- The Journey (Abdullah Ibrahim album) or the title song, 1978
- The Journey (Andraé Crouch album), 2011
- The Journey (Big Country album) or the title song, 2013
- The Journey (Bobby Lyle album), 1990
- The Journey (Earl Klugh album) or the title song, 1997
- The Journey (Immature album), 1997
- The Journey (Jessica Mauboy album), 2007
- The Journey (Ky-Mani Marley album), 1999
- The Journey (Lionel Loueke album), 2018
- The Journey (Maryam Mursal album), 1998
- The Journey (The Oak Ridge Boys album) or the title song, 2004
- The Journey (Sean Tizzle album), 2014
- The Journey (Sierra album) or the title song, 2001
- The Journey (Tina Guo album), 2011
- The Journey (Tommy Emmanuel album) or the title song (see below), 1993
- The Journey (Vinny Burns album) or the title song, 1999
- The Journey (Willie Mack album) or the title song, 2009
- The Journey, Pt. 1, by the Kinks, 2023
- The Journey, Pt. 2, by the Kinks, 2023
- The Journey, Pt. 3, by the Kinks, 2025
- The Journey...So Far, by Society's Finest, 2000
- The Journey: The Very Best of Donna Summer, 2003
- The Journey (Livin' Hits), by Craig Morgan, 2013
- The Journey, by Amsterdam, or the title song, 2005
- The Journey, by Khallice, 2003
- The Journey, by Steeleye Span, 1999
- The Journey, by Wet Wet Wet, 2021

=== Extended plays ===
- The Journey (Jamie Lynn Spears EP), 2014
- The Journey, by Voice of the Seven Woods (Rick Tomlinson), 2006
- The Journey YYC, Vol. 1, by Paul Brandt, or the title song, 2018
- The Journey BNA, Vol. 2 by Paul Brandt, 2018

=== Songs ===
- "The Journey" (911 song), 1997
- "The Journey" (Tommy Emmanuel song), 1993
- "The Journey", composed by John Ireland, 1920
- "The Journey", by Au5, 2018
- "The Journey", by Boston from Don't Look Back, 1978
- "The Journey", by Dolores O'Riordan from No Baggage, 2009
- "The Journey", by Fatboy Slim from Palookaville, 2004
- "The Journey", by Godsmack from Awake, 2000
- "The Journey", by Joe Satriani from Strange Beautiful Music, 2002
- "The Journey", by Lea Salonga from Lea Salonga, 1993
- "The Journey", by Loona from Flip That, 2022
- "The Journey", by Rick Wakeman from Journey to the Centre of the Earth, 1974
- "The Journey", by Shelby Flint from the film The Rescuers, 1977

=== Other ===
- The Journey, a 2004 DVD by Battlelore
- The Journey, a 1979 opera by John Metcalf
- The Journey, a Cree-language opera with a libretto by Tomson Highway

== Other ==
- The Journey (Palladium), a 1982 supplement for the role-playing game The Mechanoid Invasion
- The Journey, a single player campaign mode in the video game FIFA 17

== See also ==
- Journey (disambiguation)
- A Journey (disambiguation)
- Sancharam (disambiguation)
- Parvaaz: The Journey, a 2021 Indian film
