= Journey =

Journey or journeying may refer to:

- Travel, the movement of people between distant geographical locations
  - Day's journey, a measurement of distance
  - Road trip, a long-distance journey on the road

== Animals ==
- Journey (horse), a thoroughbred racehorse
- Journey (wolf) or OR-7, a gray wolf who was electronically tracked in the Northwest United States

== Arts, entertainment, and media ==
=== Films ===
- Journey (1972 film), a 1972 Canadian film directed by Paul Almond
- Journey (1995 film), a 1995 Hallmark Hall of Fame TV film
- Journey (2004 film), a 2004 short film written and directed by Christine Shin
- Journey, a Telugu dubbed movie of original Tamil movie Engaeyum Eppothum

=== Literature ===
- Journey, a 1978 novel by Marta Randall; the second volume in the Kennerin Saga
- Journey: The Adventures of Wolverine MacAlistaire, a 1983 comic by William Messner-Loebs
- Journey, a 1988 novel by Joyce Carol Thomas
- Journey (novel), a 1989 historical novel by James Michener
- Journey, a 1990 novel by Patricia MacLachlan
- Journey, a 1997 novel by Angela Elwell Hunt; the third volume in the Legacies of the Ancient River trilogy
- Journey, a 1997 science fiction novel by Al Sarrantonio; the second volume in the Five Worlds trilogy
- Journey, a 2000 novel by Danielle Steel
- Journeys (Portuguese: Viagens), a 2004 book by Paulo Coelho
- A Journey (memoir) (2010), Tony Blair's memoirs
- Journey (picture book), a 2013 children's book by Aaron Becker
- Journeying, a 1975 travel book by Nikos Kazantzakis

=== Television ===
- Pokémon Journeys: The Series, the 23rd season of Pokémon anime (2019)
  - Pokémon Master Journeys: The Series, the follow-up 24th season (2020)
  - Pokémon Ultimate Journeys: The Series, the follow-up 25th season (2021)

=== Music ===
- Journey (band), an American rock band

==== Albums ====
- Journey (Archie Roach album), a 2007 album
- Journey (Colin Blunstone album), a 1974 pop album
- Journey (Fourplay album), a 2004 jazz album
- Journey (Journey album), their 1975 debut album
- Journey (McCoy Tyner album), a 1993 jazz album
- Journey (Shota Shimizu album), a 2010 R&B J-pop album
- Journey (W-inds. album), a 2007 J-pop album
- Journey (Yeng Constantino album), a 2008 Filipino pop rock album
- Journey (Arif Mardin album)
- Journey (Kingdom Come album)
- Journey (Trio X album)
- Journey, an album by Ali Akbar Khan
- Journey (Kyla EP), a 2014 EP by Filipino R&B singer Kyla
- Journey (Henry EP), a 2020 EP by Canadian singer Henry

==== Songs ====
- "Journey", a 1972 hit single by Duncan Browne
- "Journey (Kimi to Futari de)", a song by Crystal Kay's album Spin the Music (2010)
- "Journey" / "Is It OK?", Korean song by TVXQ
- "The Journey", a song by Mott the Hoople on the 1971 album Brain Capers
- "The Journey", a 1993 song by Lea Salonga

=== Video games ===
- Journey (1983 video game), a 1983 arcade game featuring the band
- Journey (1989 video game), a 1989 computer game by Infocom
- Journey (2012 video game), a 2012 PlayStation 3 game by thatgamecompany

== Vehicles ==
- Dodge Journey, a mid-size SUV built between 2008 and 2020
- Isuzu Journey, a minibus built since 1970
- Wuling Journey, a minivan built since 2014

== Other uses ==
- Journeys (journal), an academic journal published by Berghahn Books
- Journeys (company), a shoe store chain owned by Genesco
- Journey (NGO), a Maldives-based non-governmental organization
- Journey (given name)
- William Journey (1915–2002), American 20th century politician, Missouri senator

== See also ==
- Journy, a commune in the Pas-de-Calais département in the Hauts-de-France region of France
- A Journey (disambiguation)
- The Journey (disambiguation)
- Travel (disambiguation)
- Adventure, an exciting experience that is typically a bold undertaking
- Exploration, searching for the purpose of discovery of information or resources
- Voyage
