= Bhajan =

Singing of poems or hymns in Indian traditions

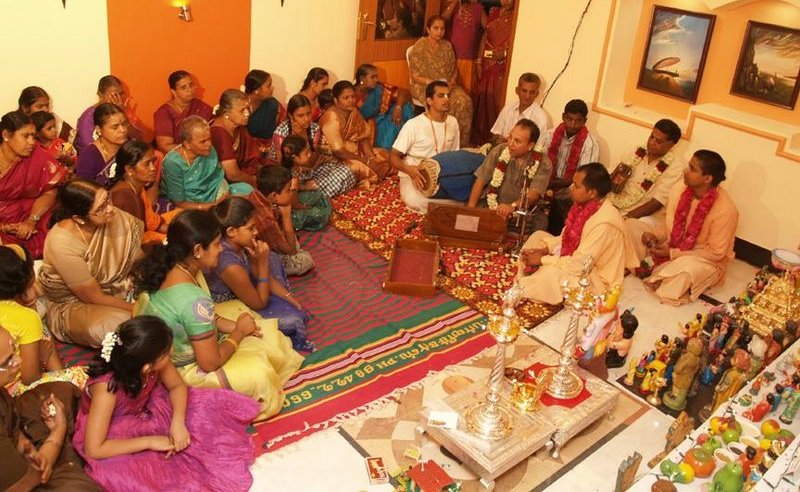
Bhajan in Coimbatore, Tamil Nadu, during Navratri Golu.

Bhajan is an Indian term for any devotional song with a religious theme or spiritual ideas, specifically among Dharmic religions, in any language. The term bhajanam (Sanskrit: भजनम्) means reverence and originates from the root word bhaj (Sanskrit: भज्), which means to revere, as in 'Bhaja Govindam' (Revere Govinda). The term bhajana also means sharing.

The term bhajan is also commonly used to refer to a group event, with one or more lead singers, accompanied with music, and sometimes dancing. Normally, bhajans are accompanied by percussion instruments such as tabla, dholak or a tambourine. Handheld small cymbals (kartals) are also commonly used to maintain the beat. A bhajan may be sung in a temple, in a home, under a tree in the open, near a river bank or a place of historic significance. A group of bhajan performers may be known as a maṇḍalī.

Having no prescribed form, or set rules, bhajans are normally lyrical and based on melodic ragas. It belongs to a genre of music and arts that developed during the Bhakti movement. It is found in the various traditions of Hinduism as well as Jainism. Within Hinduism, bhajans are particularly prevalent in Vaishnavism.

Ideas from scriptures, legendary epics, the teachings of saints and loving devotion to a deity are typical subjects in bhajans.

Bhajans have been widely composed anonymously and shared as a musical and arts tradition. Genres such as Nirguni, Gorakhanathi, Vallabhapanthi, Ashtachhap, Madhura-bhakti and the traditional South Indian form Sampradya Bhajan each have their own repertoire and methods of singing.

== Etymology ==
The Sanskrit word bhajan is derived from the root bhaj, meaning to "divide, share, partake, participate, to belong to". The word also connotes "attachment, devotion to, fondness for, homage, faith or love, worship, piety to something as a spiritual, religious principle or means of salvation".

== Hinduism ==
=== Historical roots ===
In Hinduism, bhajan and its bhakti counterpart, kirtan, have roots in the ancient metrical and musical traditions of the Vedic era, particularly the Samaveda. The Samaveda Samhita is not meant to be read as a text but sung, as is it functions like a musical score that is meant to be heard.

Other late Vedic texts mention the two scholars Shilalin (IAST: Śilālin) and Krishashva (IAST: Kṛśaśva), credited to be pioneers in the studies of ancient drama, singing and dance. The art schools of Shilalin and Krishashva may have been associated with the performance of Vedic rituals, which involved storytelling with embedded ethical values. The Vedic traditions integrated rituals with performance arts, such as a dramatic play, where not only praises to gods were recited or sung, but the dialogues were part of a dramatic representation and discussion of spiritual themes.

A lyric from a Hindu Bhajan

This body is but a guest of four days,
a house made of dirt.
On this earth your mark is made,
a symbol of your good work.

— Translated by David N. Lorenzen

The Vedas and Upanishads celebrate Nada-Brahman, where certain sounds are considered elemental, triggering emotional feelings without necessarily having a literal meaning, and this is deemed a sacred, liminal experience of the primeval ultimate reality and supreme truth. This supreme truth is considered as full of bliss and rasa (emotional taste) in the Hindu thought, and melodic sound is considered a part of human spiritual experience. Devotional music genres such as bhajan are part of a tradition that emerged from these roots.

However, bhajans rose to prominence as a way of expressing fervent devotion to the divine, breaking down barriers of caste and society, during the Bhakti and Sant movements of medieval India (about the 6th to the 17th centuries).

By writing verses in a variety of regional languages, saints and poets like Kabir, Mirabai, Tulsidas, and Surdas played a crucial part in popularizing bhajans and making them understandable to a larger audience. Their Bhajan lyrics emphasized the universality of divine love while praising the intimate connection between the believer and the deity.

=== Hindu Bhajans ===
Dhongri Bhajan

A Bhajan in Hindu traditions is an informal, loosely structured devotional song with music in a regional language. They are found all over India and Nepal, but are particularly popular among the Vaishnav traditions such as those driven by devotion to avatars of Vishnu such as Krishna, Rama, Vitthal and Narayana (often with their consorts). In Southern India, Bhajanais follow a tradition (Sampradaya) called the Dakshina Bharatha Sampradaya Bhajanai. This involves a tradition that has been followed for the last several centuries and includes Songs/Krithis/Lyrics from great composers all over India encompassing many Indian languages.

A Bhajan may be sung individually, but more commonly together as a choral event wherein the lyrics include religious or spiritual themes in the local language. Bhajans often describe loving devotion to a deity, legends from the Epics or the Puranas, compositions of Bhakti movement saints, or spiritual themes from Hindu scriptures. The Bhajans in many Hindu traditions are a form of congregational singing and bonding, that gives the individual an opportunity to share in the music-driven spiritual and liturgical experience as well as the community a shared sense of identity, wherein people share food, meet and reconnect. Bhajans have played a significant role in community organization in 19th and 20th century colonial era, when Indian workers were brought to distant lands such as Trinidad, Fiji and South Africa as cheap labor on plantations.

Some Bhajans are centuries old, popular on a pan-regional basis, passed down as a community tradition, while others are newly composed. Everyone in the Hindu tradition are free to compose a Bhajan with whatever ideas or in praise of any deity of their wish. But since they are sung, they typically follow meters of classical Indian music, the raga and the tala to go with the musical instruments. They are sung in open air, inside temples such as those of Swaminarayan movement, in Vaishnava monasteries, during festivals or special events, and at pilgrimage sites.

=== Bhajan versus Kirtan in the Hindu traditions ===
A Bhajan is closely related to Kirtan, with both sharing common aims, subjects, musical themes and being devotional performance arts. A Bhajan is more free in form, and can be singular melody that is performed by a single singer with or without one and more musical instruments. Kirtan, in contrast, differs in being a more structured team performance, typically with a call and response musical structure, similar to an intimate conversation or gentle sharing of ideas, and it includes two or more musical instruments, with roots in the prosody principles of the Vedic era.

Many Kirtan are structured for more audience participation, where the singer calls a spiritual chant, a hymn, a mantra or a theme, the audience then responds back by repeating the chant or by chanting back a reply of their shared beliefs. A Bhajan, in contrast, is either experienced in silence or a "sing along".

== Jainism ==
Stavan is a form of popular and historically pervasive genre of devotional music in Jainism. The subject of a Stavan varies, ranging from praise of Jina, Jain religious ideas and its philosophy, in a manner similar to Bhakti Bhajans.

Jainism rejects any Creator god, but accepts protector deities and rebirth of souls as heavenly beings, and its devotional singing traditions integrate these beliefs. Stavan may include dancing and worship rituals. Known as Bhajan in north and west Indian regional languages, a Stavan is typically sung as folk melodies by groups of Jain women, and are a formal part of ceremonies and celebrations within Jainism.

== Buddhism ==
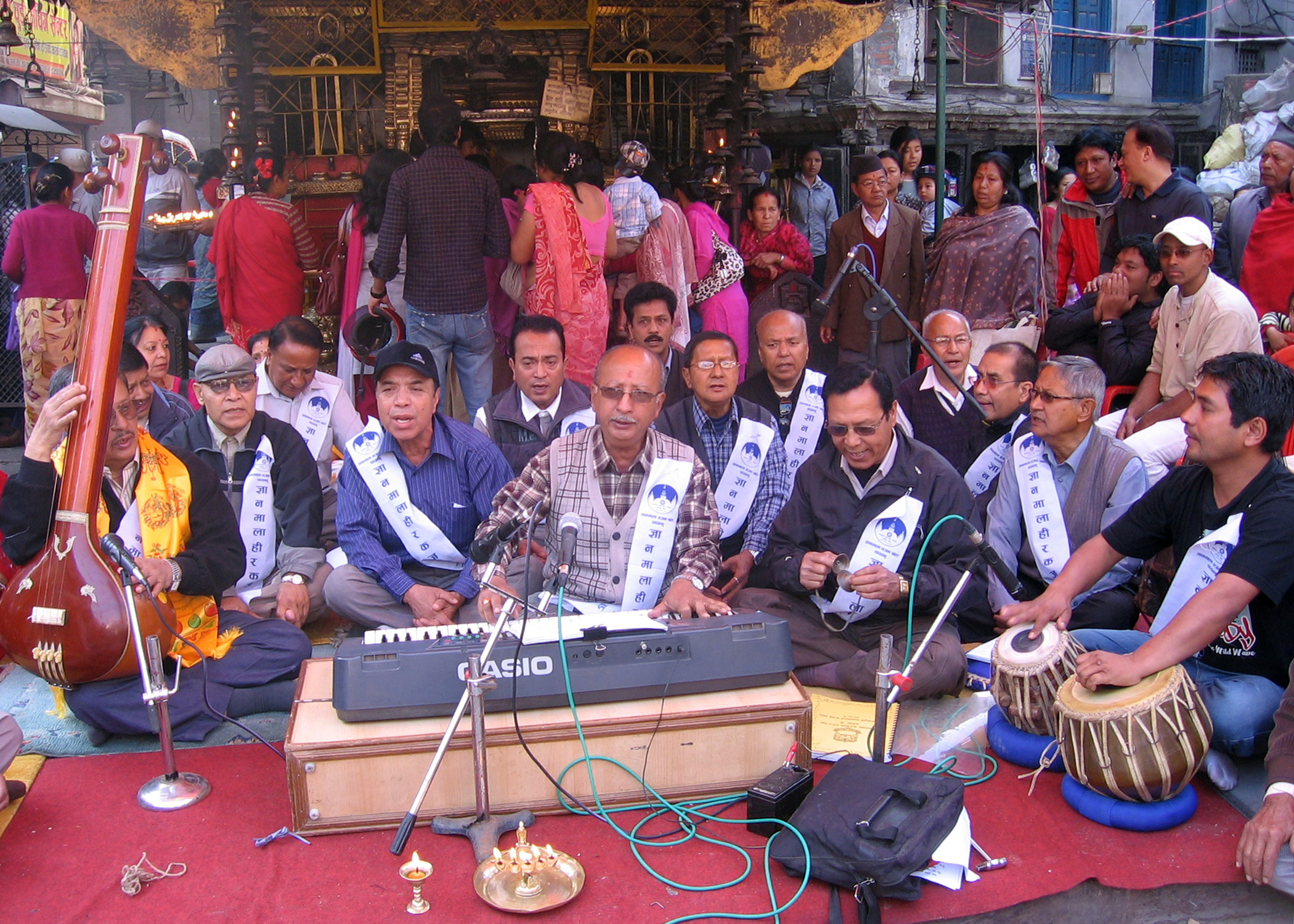
Members of the Nepalese Buddhist Gyānmālā Bhajan Khala singing hymns at Asan, Kathmandu.

Numerous Buddhist traditions use vocal music with instrumental accompaniment as part of their rituals and devotional practices. Buddhist vocal music and chanting is often part of Buddhist rituals and festivals in which they may be seen as offerings to the Buddha.

In South Asia, there are still several traditions of Buddhist bhajan singing. One is the Newari Buddhist Gunlā Bājan tradition, which has a long history.

Bengali Barua Buddhists also have a tradition of singing songs in the vernacular, which they call Buddha-samkirtan or Buddha kirtan.

== Sikhism ==
The Sikh tradition places major emphasis on devotional worship to one formless God, and bhajans are a part of this worship. A more common form of community singing is called Shabad Kirtan. A Shabad Kirtan is performed by professional religious musicians, wherein bani ('word', or 'hymns') from the Sikh scripture to a particular raga and tala.

== Modern composers and singers of Bhajans ==
Local musicians singing bhajan at Kamakhya temple, Guwahati, Assam, India

A modern Bhajan has no fixed form: it may be as simple as a mantra or kirtan or as sophisticated as the dhrupad, thumri or kriti with music based on classical ragas and talas.

V. D. Paluskar and V. N. Bhatkhande have combined Indian classical music with bhajan. Pandit Kumar Gandharva made famous the Nirguni Bhajans of Sant Kabir and Malwa Region. The dancer Mallika Sarabhai has produced performances based on bhajans. Abhinaya Chakravathi Sri JS Eswara Prasad Rao of Hyderabad, who is the disciple of AL Krishnamurthy Bhagavathar, Pudukkottai system, has produced performances based on Sampradaya bhajans under the title "Nitrya Sankeerthnam".

Bhajans of Vaishnavism, Shaivism, Shaktism traditions, Vedic mantras and Yoga chants have been composed, published in Western musical sheet format or recorded by western singers such as Krishna Das, Deva Premal, Miten, and by various West Indies singers influenced by East Indian heritage.

The Stavan compositions and literature of the Jainism tradition are extensive, with a historic overview provided by Sri Sudhara Stavan Sangrah, traditionally preserved in "puja box" by Jain families. It is vectored text with Jain lyrics and is canonically inspired.

Kripalu Maharaj is one of the modern era bhakti leaders and bhajan-kirtan composers. He has composed eleven thousand one hundred and eleven doha (couplets) on the leela of Radha and Krishna, and the devotional philosophy called Radha Govind Geet; 1008 pad (songs) called Prem Ras Madira; hundreds of kirtan in the form of Yugal Shatak and Yugal Ras and twelve pad which fully describe the beauty and the decorations of Krishna, and thirteen pad which describe the beauty and the decorations of Radha called Shree Krishn Dwadashi and Shree Radha Trayodashi. Renditions of Shree Maharaji's bhajans and kirtans have been recorded by well-known singers in India such as Manna Dey, Ajnish, Anuradha Paudwal and Anup Jalota.

In the olden days, Sants such as Mirabai, Surdas, and Narsinh Mehta composed several bhajans that are universally sung even today.

== See also ==
- Filmi devotional songs
- Gurunath
- Salabega
- Stotra
- Kirtan
- Raga

== Sources ==
- Tarla Mehta (1995). Sanskrit Play Production in Ancient India. Motilal Banarsidass. ISBN 978-81-208-1057-0.
- Adya Rangacharya (1998). Introduction to Bharata's Nāṭyaśāstra. Munshiram Manoharlal Publishers. ISBN 978-81-215-0829-2.
- Maurice Winternitz (2008). History of Indian Literature Vol 3 (Original in German published in 1922, translated into English by VS Sarma, 1981). New Delhi: Motilal Banarsidass. ISBN 978-8120800564.
