= A Journey =

A Journey may refer to:

- A Journey (memoir), a 2010 memoir by Tony Blair
- A Journey (film), a 2024 Philippine drama film
- A Journey (album), a 2015 album by Maciek Pysz
- A Journey..., a 2022 album by Hinako Omori

== See also ==
- Journey (disambiguation)
- The Journey (disambiguation)
