= Senator Journey =

Senator Journey may refer to:

- Phillip Journey (born 1956), Kansas State Senate
- William Journey (1915–2002), Missouri State Senate
