= Peter Samuel Cook =

British serial rapist

- Born: 17 August 1928; Cambridge, England
- Died: 9 January 2004 (aged 75); HM Prison Winchester, Winchester, Hampshire, England
- Other names: The Cambridge Rapist; The Hooded Rapist
- Years active: October 1974 – April 1975
- Criminal charges: Rape (six counts), assault (two counts), gross indecency
- Criminal penalty: Two life sentences

Peter Samuel Cook (17 August 1928 – 9 January 2004) was a British serial rapist who attacked women in Cambridge, England and so became known in the press as the Cambridge Rapist. He attacked women after breaking into their bedsits and flats. He was active between October 1974 and April 1975, and was also called the 'hooded rapist' because of a distinctive leather mask he wore whilst carrying out his crimes. The mask was reported to be "stitched from an old leather shopping bag. The zipper-mouthed mask had the word 'rapist' painted in white across the forehead".

Cook, who was arrested following what was one of Britain’s biggest police manhunts, was escaping from the scene of an attack wearing a long blonde wig as a disguise when he was apprehended. At the time of his arrest, Cook was 46 years old and working as a delivery driver for a wine company.

At his trial in 1976, in addition to six rapes Cook was also convicted of wounding two other women and committing an act of gross indecency on a ninth. A further victim had fought him off when he forcibly tried to gain access to her flat. On each occasion he is believed to have spoken to his victim. Following Cook's conviction, Mr Justice Melford Stevenson gave him two life sentences and recommended he should spend the rest of his life in jail.

T-shirts capitalising on Cook’s notoriety were sold by punk fashion designers Malcolm McLaren and Vivienne Westwood and one of these is retained in the collection of the Victoria and Albert Museum.

== Criminal history ==
Prior to his sexual offences, Cook already had a lengthy criminal history, having been a prolific burglar, and had served numerous prison sentences. As a young man he had made escapes from approved schools, and he later absconded from prisons on several occasions, becoming known as one of Britain’s most wanted escapees. Looking back on his Cambridge rapes 40 years later in 2014, the Cambridge News noted:

"On one occasion, after being sentenced to five years in jail, he was being held at Shire Hall in Cambridge awaiting prison transport to Dartmoor – and he managed to escape by squirming through a trapdoor in a ceiling. When he got a job as a scaffolder, workmates nicknamed him the Human Fly because of his agility. While on the run from Shire Hall, he wrote a letter to the News, boasting that he had been back in Cambridge while police were searching for him, and bragging: 'I am not worried now. Police, people, courts, nothing worries me now.'"

=== Cambridge rapes ===
Cook committed his first rape in Springfield Road, Cambridge on 18 October 1974. He later told police that he had originally intended to commit burglary but had unexpectedly been confronted with a young woman wrapped only in a towel. He told the police after his arrest: "I came to rob and stayed to rape". He subsequently struck again on 1 November, in Abbey Road, Cambridge. Less than a fortnight later he raped another student on 13 November, at Homerton College, and on 8 December he committed a further rape in Owlstone Road. In November 1974, Cook attacked a woman living in Huntingdon Road but she succeeded in repelling him. However, a month later he returned to the same address and raped another resident at the property.

It has been reported that when Cook was thwarted in his attempts to rape a woman he used lipstick to write "sleep tight - the rapist" on his intended victims' windows.

Cook’s sixth victim was raped on 13 February 1975 at her home in Marshall Road. On 5 May of that year he attempted another attack, in Pye Terrace, but was unsuccessful. However, Cook returned the following day and committed his next rape, the first he had committed in daylight, whilst the victim of the previous night’s attempt was at the local police station reporting the earlier break-in. His sixth victim described him as wearing "black leather trousers and jacket and a leather hood with eye-slits".

=== Manhunt ===
In April 1975, Detective Superintendent Bernard Hotson was put in charge of 60 officers to hunt for the rapist. Det Supt Hotson said that he was convinced they were dealing with a local man. At the time, the search for Cook was one of Britain’s biggest manhunts. The BBC reported, "He has generally managed to keep his face hidden but some victims said they believed he was wearing a wig and a false beard."

=== Arrest ===
Cook’s spree of attacks came to an end at the Owlstone Croft nurses' hostel, where he was arrested on 8 June 1975 after he had stabbed a young woman. When apprehended he was cycling away from the scene of the crime whilst wearing a long blonde wig. He was also found to be in possession of women’s clothing and lipstick. Police searching his home discovered more female clothing and make-up as well as ether, with which he had subdued his victims. They also found copies Cook had made of keys to women’s hostels. On 3 October 1975, Peter Samuel Cook pleaded guilty to six counts of rape and was given two life sentences.

== Death ==
Cook died of natural causes in Winchester Prison on 9 January 2004 at the age of 75. In 1995, moves to have Cook released on parole or moved to an open prison were opposed by Cambridge MP Anne Campbell, resulting in the then Home Office minister Michael Forsyth pledging that Cook would not be released until he was no longer considered a danger to the public.

== In popular culture ==
The Sex boutique in the King’s Road in Chelsea run by punk fashion designers Vivienne Westwood and Malcolm McLaren's sold T-shirts which "featured the leather mask worn by the Cambridge Rapist". McLaren later claimed, "The Cambridge Rapist t-shirt was designed by me upon my return from managing the New York Dolls. It was about a particular incident that occurred in the shop and worried those when they were accused of selling a leather mask to a supposed rapist who was terrorizing the town of Cambridge. I made that upon the week of my return from NY".

Cook’s exploits were also the basis of John Burnside’s 2001 novel The Locust Room, and have featured in Paul Bahn’s memoir The Cambridge Rapist - Unmasking The Beast of Bedsitland. They have also been the subject of a TV movie.

Reviewing social historian Mark Garnett’s 2007 book From Anger to Apathy: The Story of Politics, Society and Popular Culture in Britain Since 1975, Victoria Segal noted that, "Garnett is oddly fixated on both the Clash and the Cambridge Rapist".

Cook was mentioned in a podcast episode (Minisode 150) of My Favorite Murder on 25 November 2019.

He was referenced somewhat obliquely in the lyrics of the Pete Townshend song "Street in the City", from the Rough Mix album by Townshend and Ronnie Lane, with "Did you read about the Cambridge Raper?"

Cook, and his crimes, are interwoven throughout the narrative of Simon Goddard’s Bowie Odyssey 75 to help portray the marked events taking place in England that year.

== See also ==
- Batman rapist – unidentified UK serial rapist who has eluded capture since 1991
- House for sale rapist – unidentified UK serial rapist who has eluded capture since 1979. Suspected to be John Cannan, the prime suspect in the disappearance of estate agent Suzy Lamplugh
