= Michiyuki (disambiguation) =

Michiyuki or Michiyuki-bun (道行文, travel story) is a type of scene in traditional Japanese theater that depicts characters dancing or conversing while traveling.

Michiyuki may also refer to:

- Michiyuki (garment), a type of overcoat worn with kimono on long-distance journeys
- Matsuda Michiyuki (1839-1882), Japanese bureaucrat and statesman
- Michiyuki Kawashima (1969-2016), vocalist of the electronic music group Boom Boom Satellites

== See also ==
- Travel (disambiguation)
- Via Dolorosa (十字架の道行き, Jūjika no michiyuki), a route in Jerusalem believed to be the path that Jesus walked on the way to his crucifixion
