= Brandon Bays =

American motivational author and speaker

- Born: August 21, 1953 (age 73); New York City, US
- Occupations: Author, professional speaker
- Writing career
- Genres: Self-help, motivational
- Website: www.thejourney.com

Brandon Bays (born August 21, 1953) is an American author and motivational speaker. She has authored New Thought self-help books, and is best known for her 1999 book, The Journey, which became a bestseller in England and Australia.

Her work falls within the broader scope of mind-body healing and has been practiced in various countries.

== Biography ==
She was born in Trenton, New Jersey to an American father and an Austrian mother, who grew up in Vienna, Austria. At age 35, she first visited India, a country she later referred to as her “spiritual home.” She has studied the teachings of Indian spiritual masters, including Ramana Maharshi and his student HWL Poonja, who gave her the spiritual name “Janaki,” meaning “born of the self.”

She worked for Tony Robbins for 10 years, presenting the Living Health program as a Master Trainer.

She is the author of the book The Journey, first published in 1999 and later reissued in 2012. The book has been translated into multiple languages and forms the basis for her therapeutic approach.

Bays says that her healing method originated from a personal health experience in which she was diagnosed with a large abdominal tumor. She recovered without surgery or conventional medical treatment over a six-week period. She attributes her recovery to a process involving emotional release, accessing subconscious memories, forgiveness, and a form of spiritual connection she describes as "Source" or "infinite intelligence."

Following this experience, Bays developed The Journey Method, a process-based approach that combines emotional introspection and guided self-inquiry.

The Journey also incorporates elements of Neuro-Linguistic Programming (NLP) and includes specific approaches to address phobias and emotional traumas.

Brandon was deeply influenced by a spiritual teacher she fondly calls 'Papaji' ( H. W. L. Poonja ) whom she met in Lucknow, India in the early 90s. Papaji was a teacher of self inquiry in the tradition of the sage, Ramana Maharshi.

== Work and influence ==
Since the publication of The Journey, Bays has conducted seminars and workshops across five continents. Her work is particularly noted in the fields of personal development, alternative healing, and spiritual inquiry.

Her work gained prominence following her personal account of overcoming a large uterine tumor in the early 1990s, which she claims to have resolved without conventional medical treatment, instead using introspective techniques focused on uncovering and resolving unresolved childhood trauma.

Bays contends that unprocessed emotional experiences are stored at the cellular level and that these can obstruct physiological functions, potentially resulting in illness. The Journey process is designed to guide individuals through the release of these suppressed emotions by accessing and confronting the core memories associated with personal pain or trauma. Her approach draws from principles in mind-body medicine and cellular biology, suggesting that emotional suppression has measurable biochemical consequences that may influence physical health. Bays has collaborated with or appeared alongside various figures in the personal growth and consciousness movement, including Tony Robbins, Lynne McTaggart, Wayne Dyer, Bruce Lipton, and Deva Premal & Miten.

=== Reception ===
Since the publication of her book The Journey (1999), which outlines her recovery and the healing methodology she developed, Bays has cultivated a global following. Her techniques have reportedly been employed by individuals suffering from various health conditions, including cancer, and by people seeking personal development or emotional healing. The method has also found institutional support in some contexts, notably in South Africa, where it has been incorporated into educational programs with government backing. Medical professionals supportive of integrative health such as Irish GP Dr. Paddy Rudden and Australian GP Dr. Mark Naim have publicly endorsed her work as a potentially effective complement to conventional medicine.

== Bibliography ==
- The Journey: A Road Map to the soul. Simon and Schuster. 2001. ISBN 978-0743443920.
- The Journey for Kids: Liberating your child's shining potential. Harpercollins UK. 2003. ISBN 978-0007155262.
- Freedom Is: Liberating Your Boundless Potential. New World Library. 2007. ISBN 978-1577316008.
- Consciousness: The New Currency. Journey Productions, Limited. 2009. ISBN 978-0956337900.
- The Journey: A Practical Guide to Healing Your Life and Setting Yourself Free. Atria Books. 2012. ISBN 978-1451665611.
- Living The Journey: Using The Journey Method to Heal Your Life and Set Yourself Free. Atria Books. 2012. ISBN 978-1451665628.
