= Paul Bahn =

British archaeologist, translator, writer, and broadcaster

- Born: 29 July 1953 (age 72)
- Education: Marist College, Gonville and Caius College (archaeology BA) 1974, Cambridge (archaeology Ph.D) 1979
- Occupations: Archaeologist writer, book editor, book translator, journalist
- Known for: Prehistoric art archaeologist

Paul Gerard Bahn, FSA (born 29 July 1953) is a British archaeologist, translator, writer and broadcaster who has published extensively on a range of archaeological topics, with particular attention to prehistoric art. He is a contributing editor to Archaeology magazine. With Colin Renfrew, he wrote the popular archaeology textbook Archaeology: Theories, Methods and Practice.

== Early life and education ==
Born and raised in Kingston-upon-Hull, Bahn was educated at the Marist College in the city and at Gonville and Caius College, Cambridge, where he studied archaeology and graduated with a BA in 1974. He completed his Ph.D. thesis on the prehistory of the French Pyrenees at Cambridge in 1979.

== Career ==
After receiving his doctorate, Bahn held several post-doctoral fellowships, at Liverpool and London, as well as a Getty Foundation postdoctoral fellowship in the History of Art and the Humanities. He went freelance in the mid-80s, and since then has devoted himself to writing, editing and translating books on archaeology, plus occasional journalism. His main research interest is prehistoric art, especially rock art of the world, and most notably Palaeolithic art, as well as the archaeology of Easter Island. He led the team which discovered the first Ice Age cave art in Britain in 2003 and 2004.

He is a contributing editor to Archaeology magazine published by the Archaeological Institute of America (AIA), and has lectured on many archaeological study tours sponsored by the AIA and others across Europe, Africa, North America and Polynesia. Bahn has also been an active consultant expert to a number of archaeological documentaries, including the BBC production "The Making of Mankind" and the trilogy of programmes "Human Origins" for the Nova series produced by WGBH-TV, Boston.

Bahn's 2012 memoir, The Cambridge Rapist - Unmasking The Beast of Bedsitland recalls his student days at a time when serial rapist Peter Samuel Cook was at large.

== Honours ==
On 9 January 1986, Bahn was elected a Fellow of the Society of Antiquaries of London (FSA).

== Published works ==
- Pyrenean Prehistory (1984)
- Ancient Places (with Glyn Daniel, 1986)
- Images of the Ice Age (1988, with Jean Vertut)
- The Bluffer's Guide to Archaeology (1989, 2nd ed. 1999, 3rd ed. 2004)
- Archaeology: Theories, Methods and Practice (1991, with Colin Renfrew—2nd ed. 1996, 3rd ed. 2000, 4th ed. 2004, 5th ed. 2008, 6th ed. 2012)
- Easter Island, Earth Island (with John Flenley, 1992)
- 100 Great Archaeological Discoveries (1995)
- Mammoths (with Adrian Lister, 1995; 2nd ed. 2000)
- Archaeology: a very short introduction (1997)
- Journey Through the Ice Age (with Jean Vertut, 1997)
- The Cambridge Illustrated History of Prehistoric Art (1998)
- Disgraceful Archaeology (with Bill Tidy, 1999)
- Archaeology: A Very Short Introduction (Very Short Introductions series, 2000, 2nd ed. 2012)
- The Enigmas of Easter Island (with John Flenley, 2003)
- Cave Art: A Guide to the Decorated Ice Age Caves of Europe (2007; 2nd ed. 2012)
- The Cambridge Rapist - Unmasking The Beast of Bedsitland (2012, Vanguard Press, ISBN 978-1843868514)
- The History of Archaeology: An Introduction (editor, 2013)
- Lee, Georgia; Horley, Paul; Bahn, Paul (May 2014). "Comments on historical images of the moai Hoa Hakananai'a" (PDF). Rapa Nui Journal. 28 (1). Easter Island Foundation: 53–59.

== Bibliography ==
- AIA (Archaeological Institute of America) (n.d.). "Paul G. Bahn". AIA tours. AIA. Archived from the original on 27 September 2007.
