= Aaron Becker =

American writer and illustrator (born 1974)

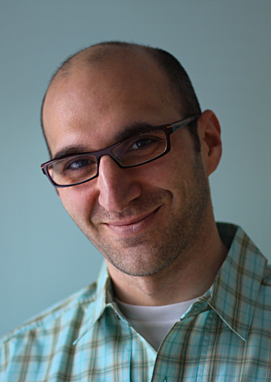
- Born: 1974 (age 51–52); Baltimore, Maryland, USA
- Education: Pomona College
- Occupations: Illustrator, Writer
- Writing career
- Genres: Children's literature, picture books
- Notable works: Journey, Quest
- Notable awards: Caldecott Honor (2014)
- Website: www.storybreathing.com

Aaron Becker (born 1974) is an American writer and illustrator of children's books. He is best known for his wordless children's book Journey, which received positive reviews in The New York Times and The Wall Street Journal and a Caldecott Honor in 2014.

== Writing career ==
Quest, the second book in Becker's Journey trilogy, was among a small group of children's books praised by National Public Radio (NPR) in anticipation of the announcement of the 2015 Caldecott Award nominees. Sam Juliano, in his popular Wonders in the Dark blog, also remarked on Quest's likelihood of Caldecott attention.

The final book of the trilogy, Return, was released in August 2016. Among the many publications reviewing the book were the Financial Times on 19 August 2016 and the New York Times on 26 August 2016.

Becker published "A Stone for Sascha" in May 2018. The book was reviewed by the New York Times Book Review, Kirkus Reviews, Publishers Weekly, The Boston Globe, et al.

In April 2024 "The Last Zookeeper" was published. Becker launched the book online with Just Imagine and talked through the long process of its creation.

Prior to his children's book work, Becker illustrated scenes in children's animated films, including The Polar Express (2004), Cars (2006), Monster House (2006), Beowulf, and A Christmas Carol.

His 2023 book, The Tree and the River, won the Carnegie Medal for Illustration in 2024.

== Biography ==
Becker was born and raised in Baltimore, Maryland. He attended Baltimore City College High School. He graduated from Pomona College in 1996, and currently lives and works in Amherst, Massachusetts.

== Published works ==
- Journey Trilogy (Candlewick Press)
  - Book 1: Journey (August 2013) ISBN 9780763660536
  - Book 2: Quest (August 2014) ISBN 9780763665951
  - Book 3: Return (August 2016) ISBN 9780763677305
- A Stone for Sascha (May 2018) ISBN 9780763665968
- You Are Light (March 2019) ISBN 9781536201154
- My Favorite Color (September 2020) ISBN 9781536214741
- One Sky (September 2022) ISBN 9781536225365
- The Tree and the River (April 2023) ISBN 9781529516760
- The Last Zookeeper (March 2024) ISBN 9781536227680
