= Travel (disambiguation) =

Travel is the movement of people or objects between relatively distant geographical locations.

Travel(s) may also refer to:

== Music ==
- Travel (Future of Forestry EP), 2009
- Travel (Mamamoo EP), 2020
- Travel (album), a 2024 album by The Necks
- Travels (Defeater album), 2008
- Travels (Jake Shimabukuro album) or the title song, 2015
- Travels (Pat Metheny Group album) or the title song, 1983
- "Travels", a song by the Smashing Pumpkins from Shiny and Oh So Bright, Vol. 1 / LP: No Past. No Future. No Sun., 2018

== Television ==
- Travel Channel, an American pay television channel
  - Travel Channel International
- "Travel" (Rob & Big), a 2008 TV episode

== Other uses ==
- Travel (basketball), or traveling, a rule violation
- Travel (magazine), later Travel Holiday, a defunct American magazine
- .travel, a top-level Internet domain
- Travel, in keyboard technology, the distance a keycap moves when pressed
- Travels (book), a 1988 non-fiction book by Michael Crichton

== See also ==
- Traveler (disambiguation)
- Travelling (disambiguation)
- Journey (disambiguation)
