= Sierra (group) =

American Christian music group

- Origin: Dallas, Texas, U.S.
- Genres: Christian pop
- Years active: 1992–2002
- Labels: Star Song
- Past members: Wendi Foy Green; Jennifer Hendrix; Deborah Schnelle; Marianne Adams

Sierra was an American Christian pop trio formed by Wendi Foy Green (wife of well-known producer and sound engineer, Brian Green), Jennifer Hendrix, and Deborah Schnelle (wife of studio songwriter and multi-instrumentalist, Rex Paul Schnelle). Founded in 1992, the vocal-based trio released their first full-length, self-titled album in 1994 on the Contemporary Christian music label, Star Song.

In 1998, Deborah Schnelle left the group and was soon replaced by Marianne Tutalo (wife of Coury Adams). After the release of five albums which produced a string of CCM radio hits including seven to reach No. 1, the group disbanded in 2002.

In 2004, Jennifer Hendrix and Marianne Tutalo formed the CCM worship band, Abide.

== Discography ==
- Sierra (Star Song, 1994) US CCM No. 10
- Devotion (Chordant Records, 1996) US CCM No. 16
- Story of Life (Chordant, 1998) US CCM No. 23
- Change (Pamplin Music, 2000) US CCM No. 32
- The Journey (Pamplin, 2001)
