= Journey (given name) =

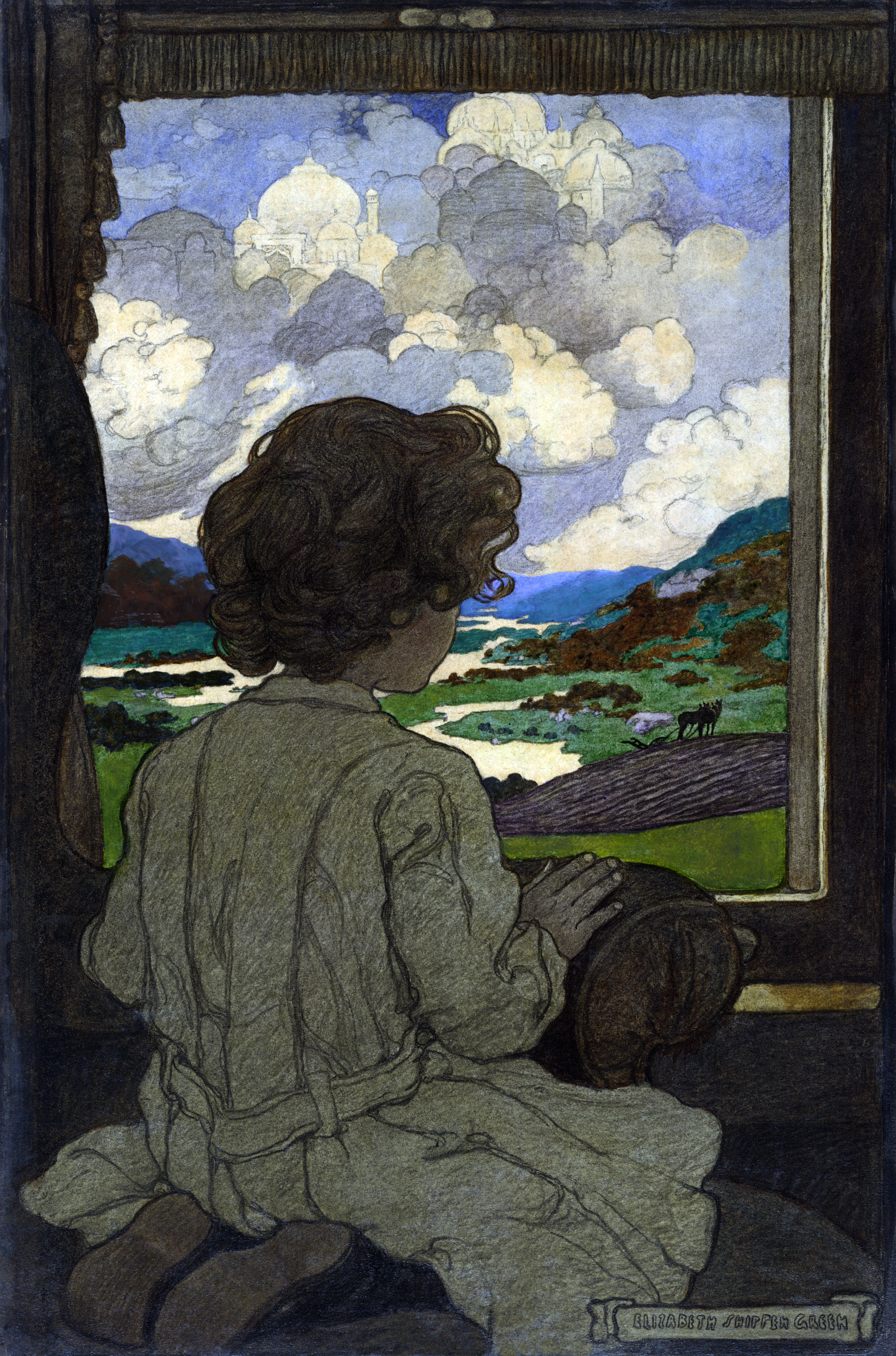
- The Journey, 1903 Harper’s Magazine illustration.
- Gender: Unisex

Origin
- Origin: Latin
- Meaning: Journey

Other names
- Related names: Jurnee

Journey is a modern English name derived from the word for a long trip. For some parents, the name evokes a sense of adventure or spiritual or physical travel or the band Journey. It is in use for both boys and girls.

== Popularity ==
It has been among the 1,000 most popular names for girls in the United States since 1999 and was the 334th most popular name for American girls in 2023. The name is less common for boys and does not rank among the 1,000 most common names.

Spelling variants in use include: Journe, Journee, Journei, Journeii, Journeigh, Journi, Journie, Journiee, Journii, Jurnee, Jurnei, Jurney, Jurni, and Jurnie.

== Notable people ==
- Journey Brown (born 1999), former American football running back. He played college football for the Penn State Nittany Lions.
- Journey Newson (born 1989), American mixed martial artist who competes in the Bantamweight division of the Ultimate Fighting Championship.

== See also ==
- Jurnee Smollett (born 1986), American actress.
