= Headlights & Tailpipes =

Studio album by Willie Mack
- Released: July 17, 2007
- Genre: Country
- Length: 40:17
- Label: Open Road
- Producer: Jason McCoy

Willie Mack chronology
Average Guy (2004)	Headlights & Tailpipes (2007)	The Journey (2009)

Headlights & Tailpipes is the second studio album by country music singer Willie Mack. It was released on July 17, 2007 by Open Road Recordings and produced by Jason McCoy. "Gonna Get Me a Cadillac," "Don't Waste Your Pretty" and "Golden Years" have all been released as singles.

== Track listing ==
1. "Gonna Get Me a Cadillac" (Willie Mack, Jason McCoy) - 3:22
2. "Don't Waste Your Pretty" (Gilles Goddard, Mack) - 2:47
3. "Golden Years" (Goddard, Wade Kirby, Mack) - 3:49
4. " " (Kirby, Mack) - 3:32
5. "You've Gotta Blame Somethin'" (Mack, Johnny Reid) - 3:59
6. "Headlights & Tailpipes" (Goddard, Mack, Jeff Nystrom) - 3:29
7. "Another Sky" (Bonnie Baker, Mack) - 3:39
8. "Love You I Do" (Mack, Steve Mandile) - 3:08
9. "TGIF" (Randy Branhan, Keith Brown, Mack) - 3:16
10. "Blacktop Time" (Mack, Chris Thorsteinson, Dave Wasyliw) - 3:12
11. "Sumpin' Sumpin'" (Branhan, Brown, Mack) - 2:54
12. "That Was Then This Is Now" (Branhan, Brown, Mack) - 3:10
