= Deva (album) =

Studio album by Deva Premal
- Released: 2018
- Genre: New Age

Deva is a studio album by Deva Premal. The album received a Grammy Award nomination for Best New Age Album for the 62nd Annual Grammy Awards.

== Track listing ==
All tracks are written by Deva Premal

No.	Title	Length
1.	"Seven Chakra Gayatri Mantra"	9:14
2.	"Sarva Mangala"	11:34
3.	"Prabhujee"	8:46
4.	"Buddham Sharanam"	9:29
5.	"Mahamantra"	6:28
6.	"Vakratunda Mahakaya"	9:14
7.	"Seven Chakra Gayatri Mantra (Prabhu mix)"	11:04
Total length:		1:05:49
