= Willie Mack (musician) =

American singer

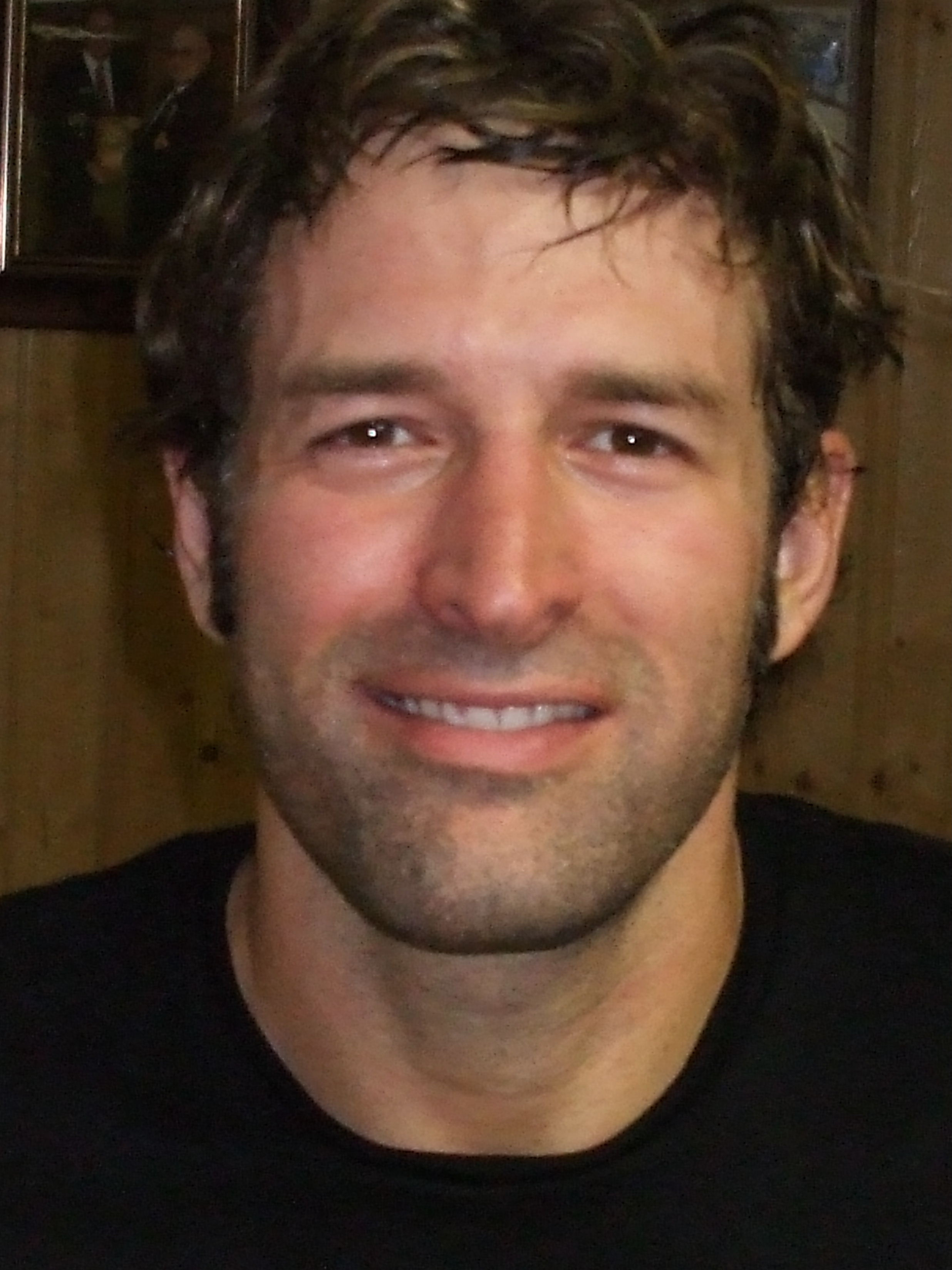

Background information
- Born: Tulsa, Oklahoma, United States
- Genres: Country
- Occupation: Singer-songwriter
- Years active: 2003–present
- Label: Open Road Recordings
- Website: www.williemack.com

Willie Mack is an American country music singer-songwriter born in Tulsa, Oklahoma and raised in Chico, Texas. He has had his songs recorded by Sara Evans, Collin Raye, The Oak Ridge Boys, and Mark Wills among others. His single "Don't Waste Your Pretty" charted on the Canadian Hot 100.

== Biography ==
Mack attended Belmont University, and signed a publishing deal with Famous Music after graduating. In 2004, Mack released his first album, Average Guy. He had a hand in writing every song on the project. The first single, "We Can't All Be From Texas," reached the top 10 on the Texas Music Chart and was used by George W. Bush during his 2004 election campaign. It was also played in the stadium during the stadium of the 2004 college football game between Oklahoma Sooners and the University of Texas Longorns (the Red River Shootout.)

When Canadian artists such as George Canyon, Adam Gregory and Brad Johner began recording Mack's songs, he started making trips to Canada and writing with Canadian songwriters. One of those songwriters was Jason McCoy, who would become the co-producer of Mack's second album and the co-writer of its first single, "Gonna Get Me a Cadillac." The album, Headlights & Tailpipes, was recorded in Toronto, Nashville and Texas. It was released in July 2007 in Canada on Open Road Recordings. Once again, Mack wrote or co-wrote all twelve tracks. The album's second single, "Don't Waste Your Pretty," peaked at No. 94 on the all-genre Canadian Hot 100. Mack released his third album, The Journey, in 2009.

In 2012, Mack formed the group Friday Night Satellites.

== Discography ==
=== Studio albums ===
Title	Album details
Average Guy	Release date: June 21, 2004; Label: self-released
Headlights & Tailpipes	Release date: July 17, 2007; Label: Open Road Recordings
The Journey	Release date: July 7, 2009; Label: AIM Music

=== Singles ===
Year	Single	Peak positions	Album
Year	Single	CAN	Album
2004	"We Can't All Be From Texas"	—	Average Guy
2007	"Gonna Get Me a Cadillac"	—	Headlights & Tailpipes
2007	"Don't Waste Your Pretty"	94	Headlights & Tailpipes
2008	"Golden Years"	—	Headlights & Tailpipes
2008	"Headlights & Tailpipes"	—	Headlights & Tailpipes
2009	"Love Like That"	—	The Journey
2009	"Everything I Need"	—	The Journey
2010	"Lay It All on Me"	—	Non-album song
"—" denotes releases that did not chart

=== Music videos ===
Year	Video
2007	"Gonna Get Me a Cadillac"
2007	"I Wanna Be Your Santa Claus" (with Jason McCoy)
2008	"Headlights & Tailpipes"

== Awards and nominations ==
Year	Association	Category	Result
2011	Canadian Country Music Association	Songwriter of the Year – "Watching You Walk Away"	Nominated
