= Indira Ganesan =

American novelist and essayist

Indira Ganesan (born 1960, in Srirangam) is an American novelist and essayist, best known for her novels The Journey (1990), Inheritance (1998), and As Sweet As Honey (2013). A graduate of Vassar College and the University of Iowa, she was granted a Mary Ingraham Bunting Fellowship at Radcliffe College in 1998 as well as a fellowship of the Paden Institute for Writers of Color in 2004. Her essays have featured in the magazines Antaeus, Glamour and Mississippi Review, as well as in Newsday. She was a judge for the Hemingway Foundation/PEN Award in 2014.
