= Travelling (disambiguation) =

Travel is the movement between distant locations. Travelling or traveling may refer to:

- Traveling (basketball), a specific rule violation in the sport of basketball
- Travelling (Roxette album), 2012
- Travelling (Steve Howe album), 2010
- "Traveling" (song), by Utada Hikaru
