= Journey (picture book) =

2013 picture book by Aaron Becker

- Editor: Mary Lee Donovan
- Author: Aaron Becker
- Series: The Journey Trilogy
- Release number: 1
- Genre: Wordless picture book
- Publisher: Candlewick Press
- Publication date: August 6, 2013
- Media type: Print (hardback & paperback)
- Pages: 40
- ISBN: 978-0-763-66053-6
- OCLC: 825046569
- Dewey Decimal: [E] 813.6
- LC Class: PZ7.B38125 Jo 2013
- Followed by: Quest

Journey is a children's wordless picture book written and illustrated by Aaron Becker. The book was published in 2013 by Candlewick Press. It was selected as a Caldecott Honor Book in 2014.

Through pictures alone, the book tells the story of a lonely girl who uses a red crayon to escape from a mundane world into a magical adventure full of fun and exhilarating adventures. The girl travels on a magic carpet and boat, gets trapped by an evil tyrant, and must find a way to escape along with a purple bird.

Journey is the first of a trilogy. The other books are Quest (2014) and Return (2016).

== Synopsis ==
The book follows the story of a young girl living in a city. At the beginning of the story she sadly rides a red scooter back to her apartment where she attempts to get the attention of her family members. When her family is too busy to talk to her, she finds a red crayon and draws a door on her bedroom wall. The door opens up into a forest of hanging lights and she steps into a fantasy world. The little girl discovers the walled city of Pallonezia with steampunk airships flying above.

== Reception and awards ==
The book was well reviewed, receiving a starred review from Kirkus Reviews, Publishers Weekly, and School Library Journal. Sarah Harrison Smith wrote in The New York Times that the "book has a beauty distinctly its own." In USA Today, John Geddes wrote that the book is "one of the finest get-lost-in-your-own-imagination tales". Jesse Karp praised the book in Booklist saying it is "Laudable for its adventuresome female protagonist, scope, and sense of fun".

The book spent multiple weeks on The New York Times best seller list. IndieBound also listed the book as a best seller.

=== Awards ===
Award	Date	Result	Ref.
The New York Times/New York Public Library Best Illustrated Children’s Books Award	2013	Won	
Caldecott Medal	2014	Won	
Goodreads Choice Awards	2013	Nominated	
