= The Journey (Willie Mack album) =

Studio album by Willie Mack
- Released: July 7, 2009
- Genre: Country
- Length: 1:00:09
- Label: AIM Music

Willie Mack chronology
Headlights & Tailpipes (2007)	The Journey (2009)

The Journey is a studio album by country music singer Willie Mack. His third album, it was released on July 7, 2009 by AIM Music. Its first single, "A Love Like That," reached the Top 30 on the Radio & Records Canadian country singles chart.

== Track listing ==
1. "The Journey" – 3:45
2. "Howdy Eh" – 3:58
3. "A Love Like That" – 3:10
4. "She Won't Be Little Long" – 3:43
5. "You're My Hometown" – 3:31
6. "Love Walked In" – 2:42
7. "Everything I Need" – 4:30
8. "Just the Way You Are" – 3:41
9. "I'm Gonna Love Her" – 3:41
10. "Hold" – 4:16
11. "See You When I See You" – 4:01
12. "Springsteen" – 3:23
13. "Get Here" – 3:46
14. "Places I Ain't Ever Seen" – 4:14
15. "Wide Open" – 4:49
16. "Just Jesus" – 2:59
