= List of Greek films of 2014 =

The Greek film industry produced over thirty feature films in 2014. This article fully lists all non-pornographic films, including short films, that had a release date in that year and which were at least partly made by Greece. It does not include films first released in previous years that had release dates in 2014.

== Major releases ==
Opening		Title	Cast and crew	Studio	Genre(s)	Ref.
J A N U A R Y	18	Love Is Strange	Director: Ira Sachs; Cast: Alfred Molina, John Lithgow, Marisa Tomei	Sony Pictures Classics	Drama	
J A N U A R Y	20	Listen Up Philip	Director: Alex Ross Perry; Cast: Jason Schwartzman, Elisabeth Moss, Krysten Ritter, Joséphine de La Baume, Jonathan Pryce	Tribeca Film	Comedy; Drama	
M A Y	19	Xenia	Director: Panos H. Koutras; Cast: Kostas Nikouli, Nikos Gelia	Pyramide Distribution	Drama	
S E P T E M B E R	4	The Lesson	Directors: Kristina Grozeva, Petar Valchanov; Cast: Margita Gosheva, Ivan Barnev	Film Movement	Drama	
S E P T E M B E R	7	Red Rose	Director: Sepideh Farsi; Cast: Mina Kavani, Vassilis Koukalani, Shabnam Tolouei	UDI	Drama	
S E P T E M B E R	9	Modris	Director: Juris Kursietis; Cast: Kristers Piksa		Drama	
N O V E M B E R	27	The Journey	Director: Lance Nielsen; Cast: Jason Flemyng, Linsey Coulson		Drama	

== See also ==
- 2014 in film
- 2014 in Greece
- Cinema of Greece
- List of Greek submissions for the Academy Award for Best Foreign Language Film
