= The Journey (installation) =

The Journey is an art installation on the subject of human trafficking. Through a series of seven linked transport containers it depicts the experiences of women sold into the sex trade.

The installation's individual containers were designed by artists including Anish Kapoor, Sandy Powell and Michael Howells. Its creation was instigated by the actor Emma Thompson and the activist Sam Roddick (daughter of the late Body Shop founder Anita Roddick). It is designed to highlight the work of the Helen Bamber Foundation, an organisation set up by the psychotherapist Helen Bamber which offers therapeutic treatment to those traumatised by violence and abuse.

The installation was first shown in Trafalgar Square in London between 23 and 30 September 2007. It was then shown at the Heldenplatz in Vienna between 13 and 16 February 2008, to coincide with the Vienna Forum to Fight Human Trafficking, a conference held in Vienna as part of the ongoing UN Global Initiative to Fight Human Trafficking (UN.GIFT).
