= Journey (NGO) =

Maldives-based non-governmental organization

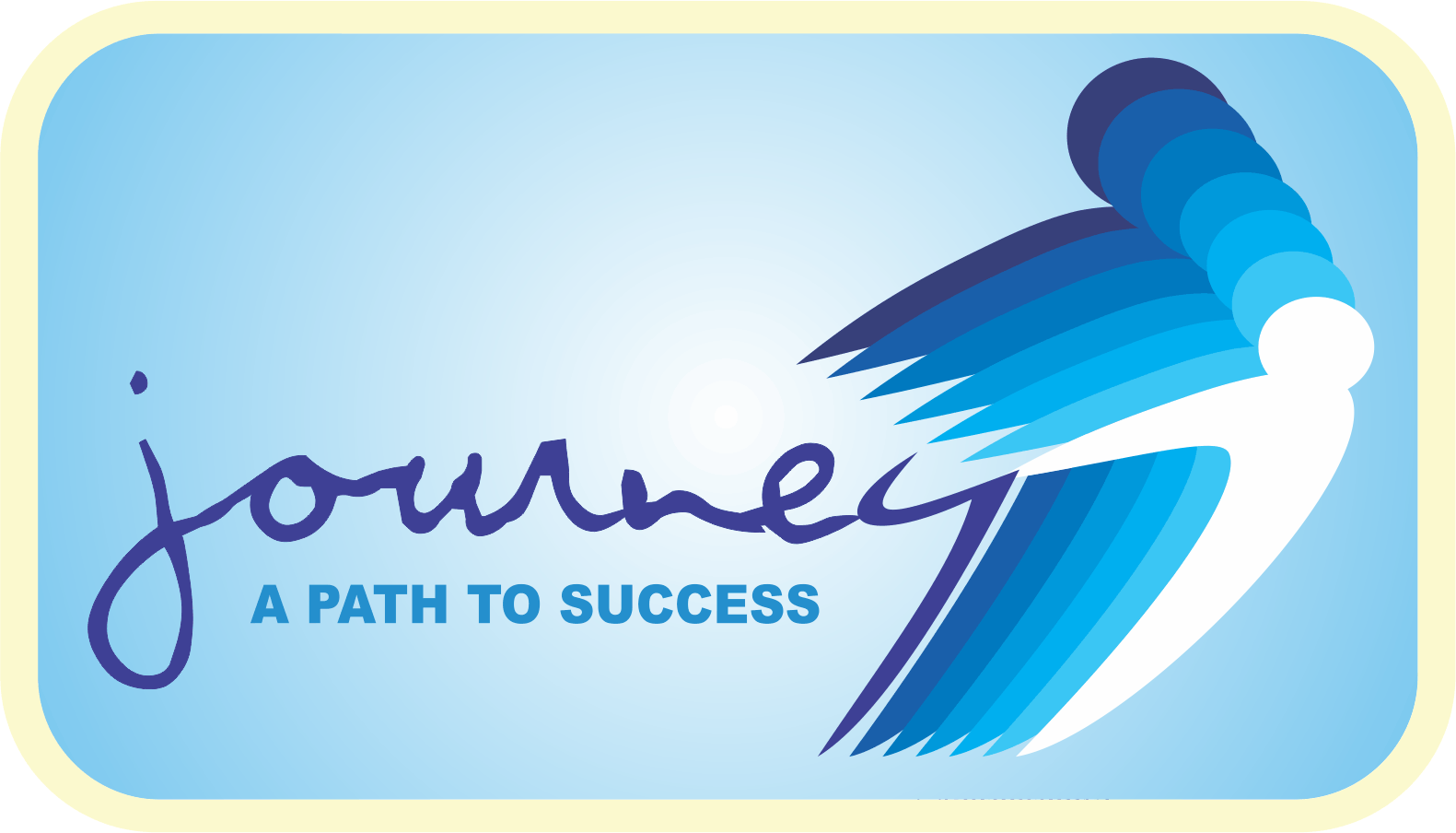
- Founded: November 29, 2005 by a group of recovering users in The Republic of Maldives
- Type: Non-profit; NGO
- Location(s): National G.Greenge, 20119, Male' Journey
- Services: Creating awareness for prevention of Drugs and HIV in community. Helping the drug users deviate from addiction. Preventing youth from engaging in HIV prone anti-social behavior.
- Fields: HIV and Drugs prevention campaigns, research, lobbying, media spot messages, daily sessions and classes, daily outreach interventions, peer and group counseling, Voluntary counseling and testing, All free.
- Members: More than 1500 members.
- Key people: Mohamed Faseen (Chair Person); Mohamed Shueb (CEO); Ahmed Nazim (COO)
- Website: www.journey.org.mv

Journey (Dhivehi: ޖާރނީ) is a Maldives-based non-governmental organization (NGO) that focuses on the use of drugs and HIV (human immunodeficiency virus) and promoting tolerance. The organization was officially registered on November 29, 2005 with the Ministry of Home Affairs of the Republic of Maldives and functions within the premises of the Maldivian legal and regulatory system. Journey is a unique organization to make the people aware about the fact that, in the case of drug users "Recovery is Possible" and to change the social belief or social stigma 'Once an Addict always an Addict'.

== Vision of Journey ==
A Maldives that is empowered and educated on vulnerabilities of youth; a nation where deviant behavior is accepted, marginalized groups are openly supported, tolerance is actively exercised, dissent and diversity are bravely embraced.

== Mission and Goals ==
The primary mission of Journey consists of the following:

- The prevention of drug experimentation among young people.
- The prevention of HIV vulnerable behavior among young people.
- Raising public awareness on drug addiction, HIV, and related issues.
- Assisting substance users with the process of "recovery" and avoiding relapse.
- Promoting tolerance and accepting dissent and diversity.

The main goals of Journey are:

- Provision of supportive aftercare service for recovering drug users.
- Prevention of substance use and HIV.
- Intervention.
- Creating awareness of drugs, drug addiction, sexually transmitted disease (STD), HIV, and drug-related issues.
- Facilitating the provision of peer-to-peer support for young people to refrain from substance abuse and experimentation with drugs.
- Dissemination of information on infectious blood-borne diseases.
- Support for a "harm reduction" approach to substance use and STD-prevention.

Journey was established by recovering addicts who had gone through all the suffering and misery of ceasing drug use. In addition, the NGO is managed and run by recovering drug users. Journey believes its staff members are extremely helpful as they can feel and understand the experiences of their addicted brothers and sisters. This is the main reason why Journey took the initiative to help and assist others through their recoveries from drug dependency.

== HIV and Drug Prevention Campaigns ==
Journey has started three HIV and drug prevention campaigns to prevent youth from experimenting with drugs and engaging in risky activities which can lead to HIV.

- "Wake up". Wake Up Campaign in collaboration with UNICEF.
- "I Control My Brain" campaign with support from UNODC, UNDP, and local agencies. (UNDP’s HIV/AIDS programme supported Journey (NGO), to launch the “I Control My Brain” drug prevention campaign, which focused on using the media to educate and enable Maldivian youth to reject illicit drugs, prevent drug abuse and encourage current users to quit.) This campaign was launched by former Vice President, the current president of Maldives His Excellency Dr. Mohammed Waheed Hassan Manik.
- "Parental Guide-Successful Parenting" booklet for HIV and Drug prevention with support of UNODC. The booklet was released by the current Vice President of Maldives His Excellency Mohamed Waheed Deen.

== The Evidence based Prevention Program of Journey- RISE ==
An increase in drug abuse has been observed in the Maldives since highly addictive drugs such as heroin were introduced in the early 1990s. However, there are no programs in place at the state level for drug prevention, nor does prevention receive much priority.

Journey recognized that prevention is the best cure when it comes to health issues and with UNICEF's support for prevention, Journey brought together the expertise of international experts and international prevention guidelines to create the first evidence-based prevention program in the Maldives.

UNODC/WHO's International Standards on Drug Use Prevention - Second Edition provided the basis for developing the RISE prevention program and revising it.

Journey established a Pilot initiative on one Maldives island in 2012, with the intention of replicating it on every island by 2030. Journey has already conducted the program on 13 Maldives islands by 2020.

== International and National Awards and Recognition ==
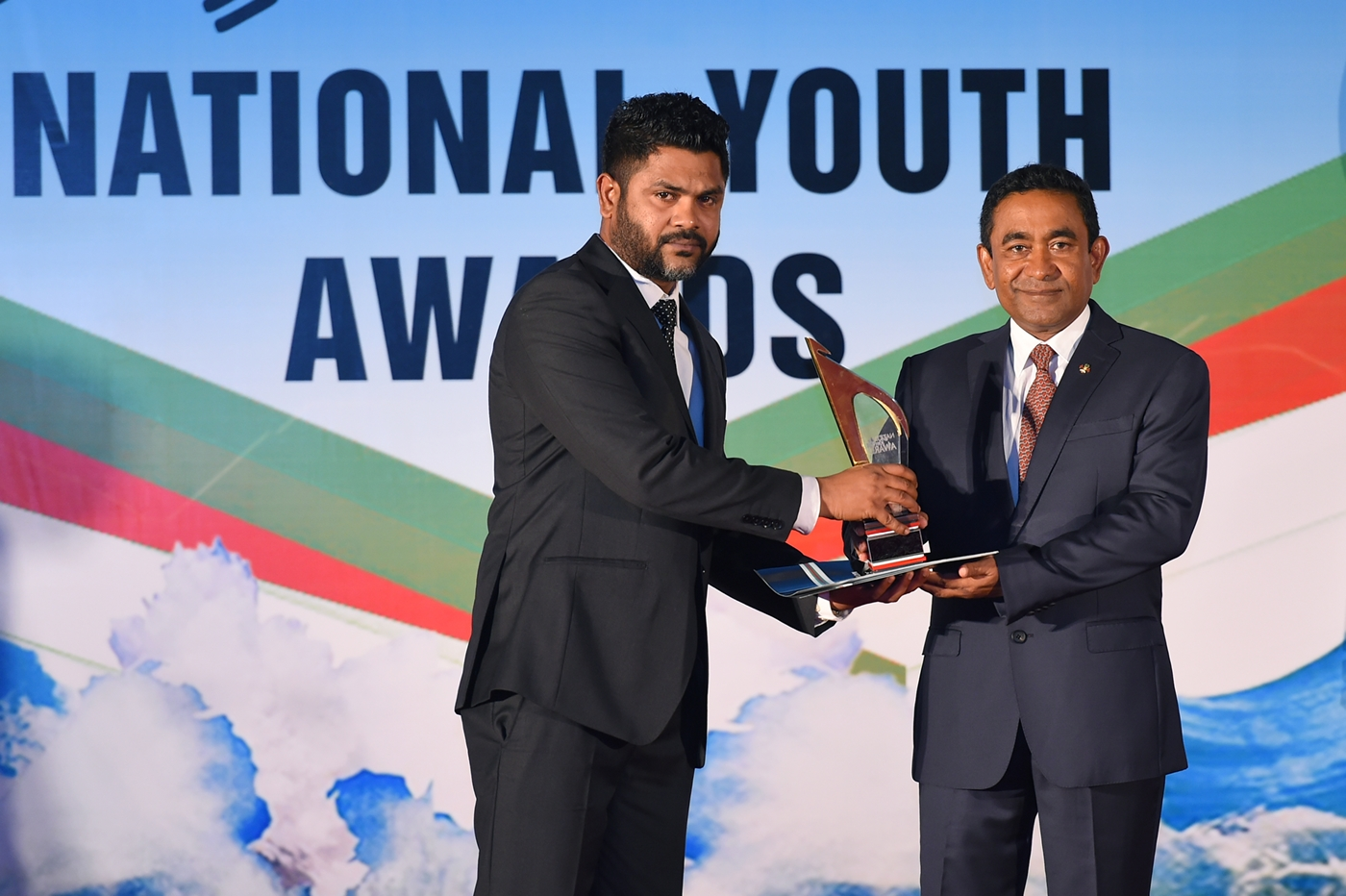
Journey (NGO) receives national youth

1. National Youth Award 2013 by HEP Yameen Abdul Gayyoom of Maldives awarded to Journey (NGO) for doing outstanding work in betterment of society.
2. SAARC The 2011 Award was conferred upon Moahmed Faseen Rafiu (founder member of Journey NGO) on the theme, ‘Youth Leadership in the Fight against Social Ills' after competing among 19 applicants from seven Member States of SAARC.
3. Youth Award of 2015 awarded to staff of Journey (NGO) Nasrulla Niyaz.
4. Youth Award of 2016 awarded to Volunteer of Journey (NGO) Ahmed Wanood.
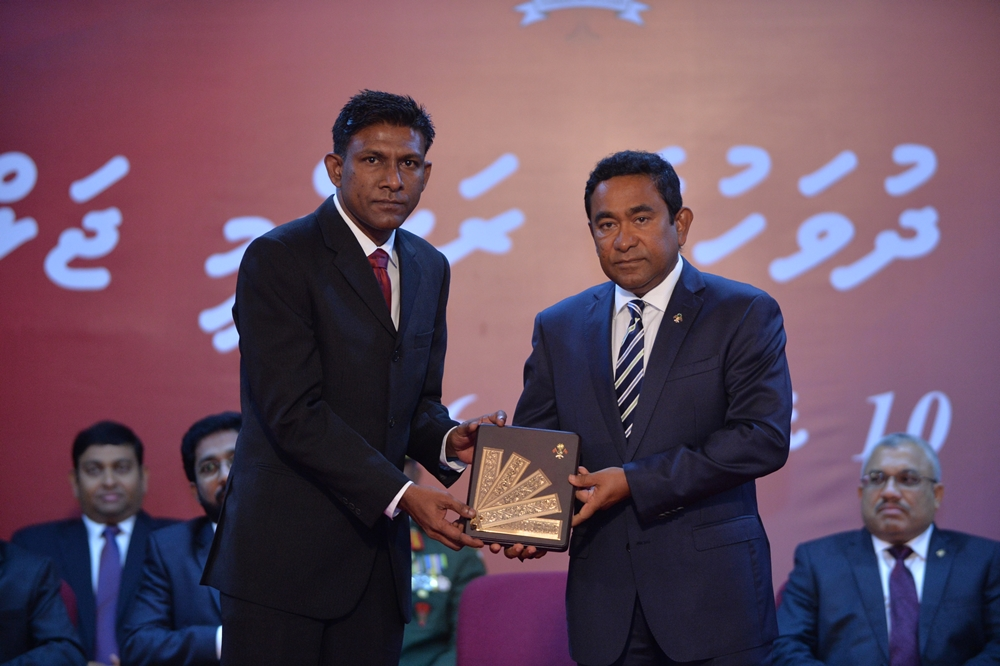
  National award of recognition 2016
5. National award of recognition awarded to Journey (NGO), in the area of Social Services (contribution on elimination of negative action in the society)
6. Winner of International E-NGO award in the category of Health and wellness.
7. National award for Special Achievement 2017.
