= The Journey (Sierra album) =

Studio album by Sierra
- Released: August 14, 2001
- Genre: Religious
- Length: 44:03
- Label: Pamplin Records
- Producers: Brian Green; Scott Williamson

Sierra chronology
Change (2000)	The Journey (2001)

Professional ratings
Review scores
Source	Rating
AllMusic	4/5 stars

The Journey is the fifth album by contemporary Christian pop trio, Sierra.

== Reception ==
Ashleigh Kittle of AllMusic reviewed the album and said it is "carefully crafted and beautifully arranged." A Billboard Magazine review stated "The quality of the material and the performances make this a journey well worth taking", and named "Carry Me" a gorgeous number.

== Track listing ==
No.	Title	Writer(s)	Length
1.	"I Will Exalt the One"	Michael Merritt; Jackie Anderson	4:11
2.	"Carry Me"	Marianne Adams; Garry Kean	4:30
3.	"That's What I Know"	Wendi Foy Green; Brian Green	3:52
4.	"Your Love"	Wendi Foy Green; Marianne Adams	4:22
5.	"I Believe"	Wendi Foy Green; Marianne Adams	4:52
6.	"Open Arms of Love"	Marianne Adams; Garry Kean	4:24
7.	"The Journey"	Wendi Foy Green; Joe Beck; Jimmy Frazier	3:10
8.	"All That You Are"	Wendi Foy Green; Joe Beck; Jimmy Frazier	4:08
9.	"I See"	Wendi Foy Green; Brian Green	5:00
10.	"The Rest of My Life"	Marianne Adams; Garry Kean	5:34
Total length:			44:03

- Track information and credits taken from the album's liner notes.

== Personnel ==
"I Will Exhalt the One"

- Keyboards – Byron Hagan
- Acoustic Guitar – Tom Hemby
- Electric Guitar – Glenn Pearce
- Bass – Mark Hill
- Drums & Percussion – Scott Williamson

"Carry Me"

- Keyboard programming – Brian Green
- Acoustic Guitar – Tom Hemby
- Mandolin – Tom Hemby
- Electric Guitar – Jerry McPherson
- Bass – Mark Hill
- Drums – Steve Brewster
- Piccolo – Jennifer Hendrix
- Violin – David Davidson
- Choir – Deborah Schnelle, Lisa Merrell, Joslyn Tredway, Garry Kean, Darren Scott, Seth Fickett, Stacey Wilbur

"That's What I Know"

- Keyboards – Byron Hagan
- Acoustic Guitar – Tom Hemby
- Electric Guitar – Glenn Pearce
- Bass – Mark Hill
- Drums & Percussion – Scott Williamson

"Your Love"

- Keyboards – Byron Hagan
- Electric Guitar – Glenn Pearce
- Bass – Mark Hill
- Drums & Percussion – Scott Williamson

"I Believe"

- Keyboards – Byron Hagan
- Acoustic Guitar – Tom Hemby
- Electric Guitar – Glenn Pearce
- Bass – Mark Hill
- Drums & Percussion – Scott Williamson

"Open Arms of Love"

- Keyboard programming – Brian Green
- Piano – Brian Green
- Acoustic Guitar – Tom Hemby
- Electric Guitar – Jerry McPherson
- Bass – Mark Hill
- Drums – Steve Brewster
- Scripture Reading – Cooper Green

"The Journey"

- Keyboards – Byron Hagan
- Acoustic Guitar – Tom Hemby
- Electric Guitar – Glenn Pearce
- Bass – Mark Hill
- Drums & Percussion – Scott Williamson

"All That You Are"

- Keyboard programming – Brian Green
- Accordion – Brian Green
- Acoustic Guitar – Tom Hemby
- Electric Guitar – Jerry McPherson
- Bass – Mark Hill
- Drums – Steve Brewster

"I See"

- Keyboard programming – Brian Green
- Piano – Brian Green
- Acoustic Guitar – Tom Hemby
- Electric Guitar – Jerry McPherson
- Bass – Mark Hill
- Drums – Steve Brewster
- Violin – David Davidson, Conni Ellisor
- Cello – John Catchings
- String Arrangements – Brian Green

"The Rest of My Life"

- Keyboard programming – Brian Green
- Piano – Brian Green
- Hammond B-3 – Brian Green
- Acoustic Guitar – Tom Hemby
- Electric Guitar – Jerry McPherson
- Bass – Mark Hill
- Drums – Steve Brewster
- Choir – Deborah Schnelle, Lisa Merrell, Joslyn Tredway, Garry Kean, Darren Scott, Seth Fickett, Stacey Wilbur
