= Andy Desmond =

British musician and songwriter (born 1947)

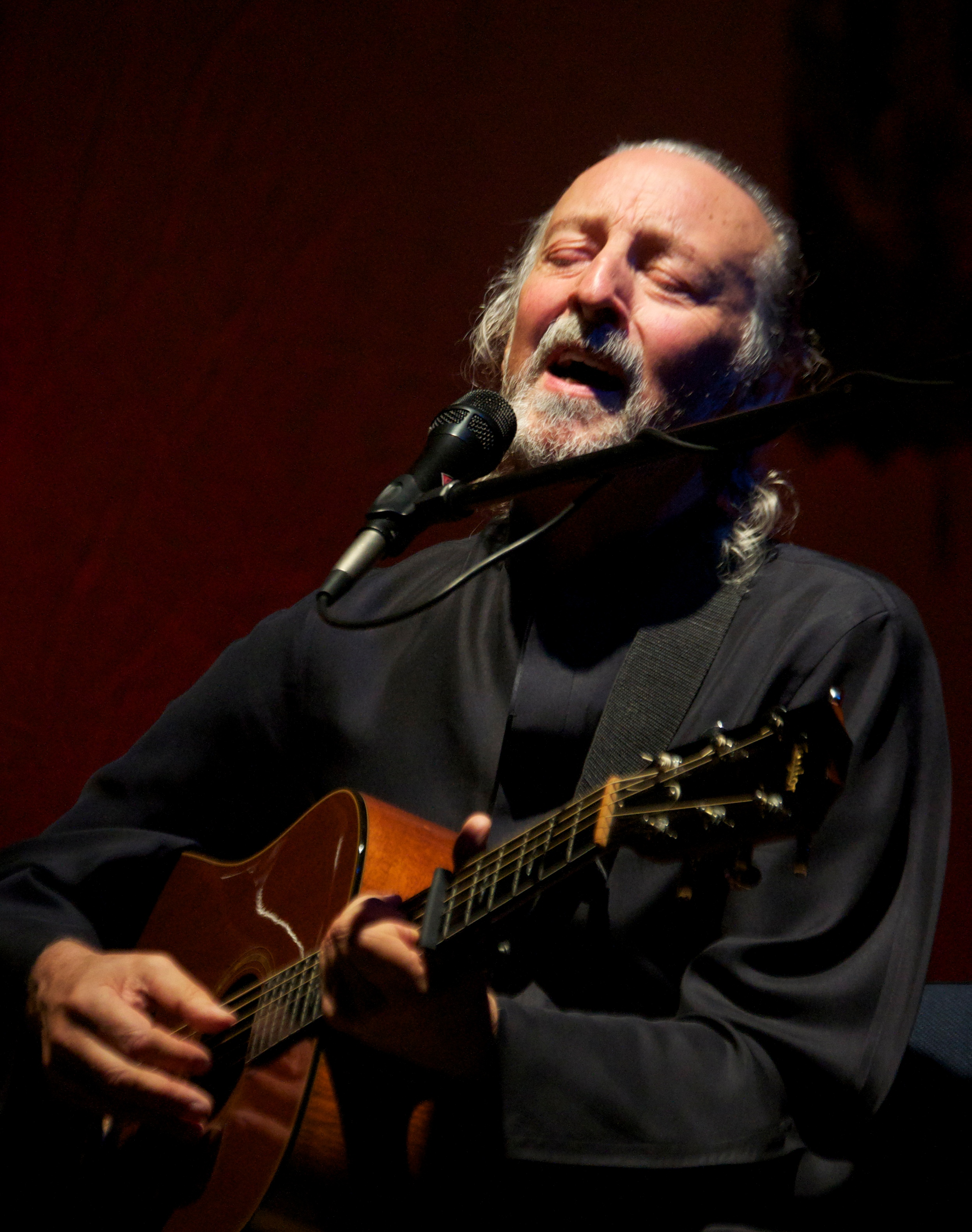
- Miten in concert, Munich, in October 2010
- Born: August 1947 (age 78); Woking, Surrey
- Other names: Miten
- Spouse: Deva Premal
- Website: http://www.devapremalmiten.com/

Andy Desmond (born August 1947), also known as Miten, is a British musician and songwriter. He performs primarily within yoga and alternative healing communities.

== Background ==
In the late 1960s, Desmond founded the folk/rock duo "Gothic Horizon" with musical partner Richard Garrett. The band released two albums on UK Argo: The Jason Lodge Poetry Book (1971) and Tomorrow's Another Day (1972).

In 1973, Desmond began performing solo. He was part of a group of folk musicians signed by Ray Davies to his record label, Konk Records, which also included Tom Robinson, Claire Hamill and Café Society. Desmond released Living on a Shoestring on Konk in 1975. The album featured members of The Kinks and was produced by Dave Davies and keyboardist John Gosling.

Desmond was subsequently signed to Ariola Records in London. In 1976, Ariola released Andy Desmond, an album of ten self-composed songs produced by Los Angeles producer Bones Howe.

Following its release, Desmond opened for artists such as Fleetwood Mac, Randy Newman, Hall & Oates, The Cate Brothers and The Kinks. He was a guest performer on Fleetwood Mac’s UK Rumours Tour and opened for Ry Cooder on his 1978 European tour.

Desmond then explored meditation and Eastern philosophy. In 1980, he was initiated into sannyasa by the Indian mystic Bhagwan Shree Rajneesh and given the Sanskrit name Prabhu Miten, meaning "Friend of God". He spent time at Osho’s ashram in Pune, where he recorded and produced the album In Wonder, described as a tribute to his guru. During this period, Desmond met record producer John Leckie, known at the ashram as "Nagara". They collaborated on projects including the album Blown Away for Prabhu Music. From 1992 onward, the German New Age label Tao Music (later New Earth Records) released three albums featuring Desmond: Heartbeat, Shadow of Light and Tidal Wave.

Desmond tours with his musical partner, Deva Premal, whom he met in India in 1990. Known as Deva Premal & Miten, they perform Indian Sanskrit mantras and Desmond’s songs. They have collaborated with motivational speaker Anthony Robbins, author Eckhart Tolle and singer Cher, who covered their version of the ancient prayer The Gayatri Mantra on her Farewell Tour album in 2002.

== Discography ==
- The Jason Lodge Poetry Book (Gothic Horizon), UK Argo 1971
- Tomorrow's Another Day (Gothic Horizon), UK Argo 1972
- Living On A Shoestring, Konk 1975
- Andy Desmond, Ariola Records, 1976
- Global Heart, Native Soul (1996)
- Strength of A Rose (with Deva Premal) (1996)
- Trusting the Silence (with Deva Premal) (1997)
- Blown Away (1999)
- Dance of Life (1999)
- Satsang (Deva Premal & Miten) (2002)
- Songs for the Inner Lover (with Deva Premal) (2003)
- More Than Music (Deva Premal & Miten) (2004)
- Soul In Wonder (with Deva Premal) (2007)
- Download Singles (with Deva Premal) (2009)
- Deva Premal & Miten In Concert (Deva Premal & Miten with Manose) (2009)
- Deva Premal & Miten with Manose - A Deeper Light (April 2013) co-produced with Joby Baker and Maneesh de Moor
- Temple at Midnight (2016)

=== Producer ===
- Deva Premal - The Essence (executive producer) (1998)
- Deva Premal - Love is Space (co-producer with Kit Walker) (2000)
- Deva Premal - Embrace (co-producer with Kit Walker) (2002)
- Deva Premal - Dakshina (co-producer with Martyn Phillips and Praful) (2005)
- Deva Premal - Deva Premal Sings the Moola Mantra (co-producer with Ben Leinbach) (2007)
- Deva Premal - Password (co-producer with Rishi) (Oct 2011)
- Deva Premal & Miten with Manose - A Deeper Light (April 2013) co-produced with Joby Baker and Maneesh de Moor
