= William Journey =

American politician

William Kelso Journey

Member of the Missouri Senate from the 31st district
- In office 1956–?

Personal details
- Born: July 19, 1915 Calhoun, Missouri
- Died: 2002 (aged 86–87)
- Party: Democratic
- Spouse: Beulah Jane Park
- Children: 4 (3 daughters, 1 son)
- Education: Central Missouri State College; University of Colorado Boulder; University of Missouri
- Occupation: Politician, Navy officer, farmer

William Kelso Journey (July 19, 1915 - 2002) was an American politician from Clinton, Missouri, who served in the Missouri Senate and the Missouri House of Representatives. He served as prosecuting attorney of Henry County, Missouri. During World War II, Journey served in the U.S. Navy from 1942 until 1946.
