= Deva Premal =

German singer (born 1970)

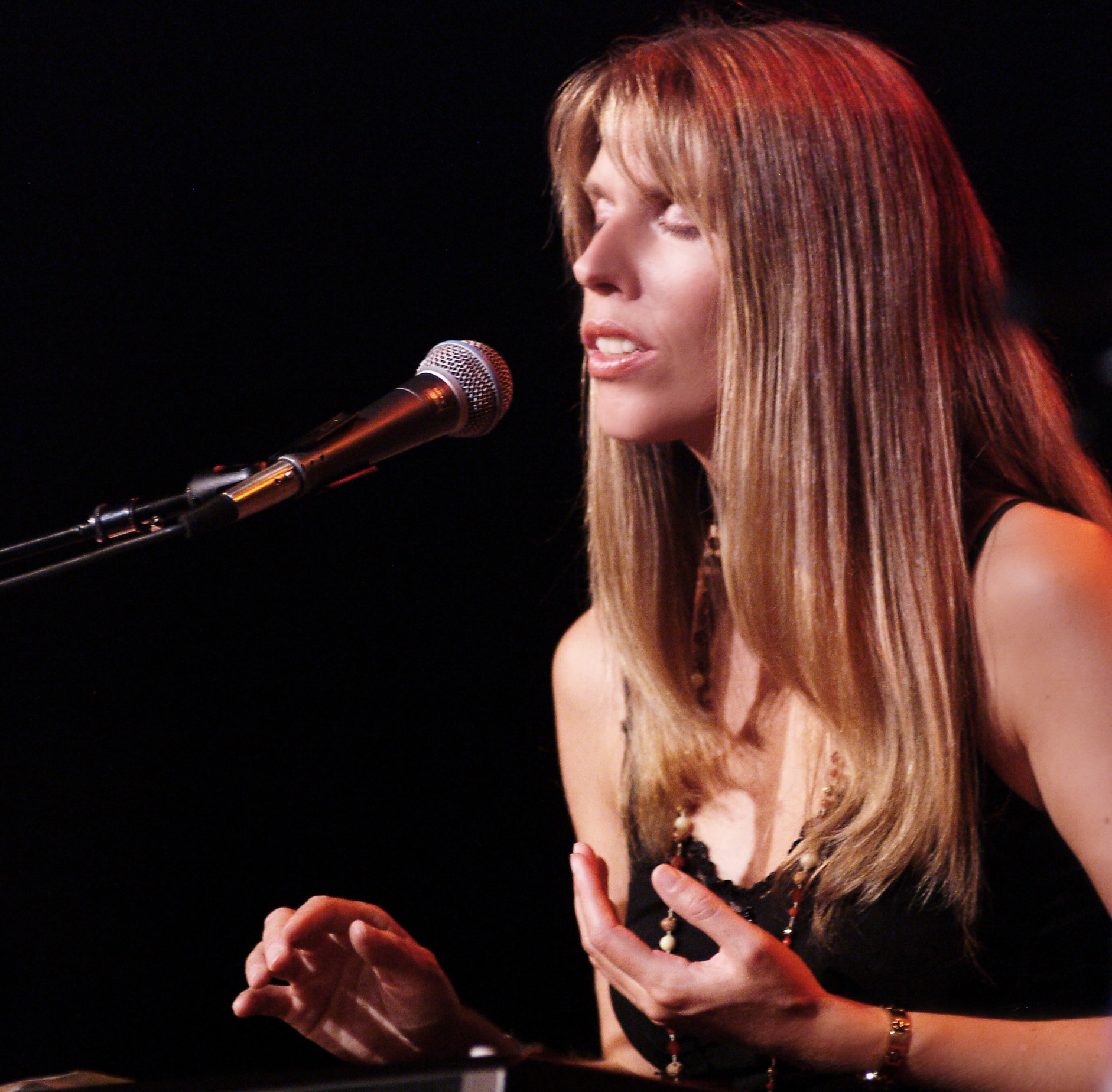
- Premal in 2006

Background information
- Born: Jolantha Fries; 2 April 1970 (age 56); Nürnberg, Germany
- Spouse: Andy Desmond

Jolantha Fries (born 2 April 1970), known professionally as Deva Premal, is a German singer known for her performances of Sanskrit mantras. Her music is composed and produced with Prabhu Music. Her album Deva (2018) was nominated for a Grammy Award for Best New Age Album at the 62nd Annual Grammy Awards.

== Biography ==
Premal met her partner, Miten, at the Osho International Meditation Resort in Pune, India, in 1990, where she was studying reflexology, shiatsu, craniosacral therapy and massage. They have toured together since 1992, offering concerts and chant workshops.

In July 2005, Premal chanted the Gayatri Mantra for her father as he was dying. She recounted the experience: "We kept singing for what must have been over half an hour when suddenly the monitor showed that he was about to leave. I continued to sing, and the last sound he heard as he passed on was his beloved 'Gayatri Mantra'. Finally, we ended with the mantra Om, and the circle was complete. He had welcomed me onto this planet with the 'Gayatri,' and I accompanied him out of this physical existence with it."

In an interview with LA Yoga Magazine, Premal discussed the effect of chanting mantras: "The meaning is secondary...with Sanskrit, the word ananda is the sound vibration of bliss... It's working on a cellular level."

Premal's chants have been used in various contexts. Cher featured Premal's version of the "Gayatri Mantra" on her Farewell Tour, and Russian prima ballerina Diana Vishneva danced to Premal's "Gayatri" in Moses Pendleton's F.L.O.W. series. Edward James Olmos reportedly gave copies of Premal's "Gayatri Mantra" to the cast and crew of Battlestar Galactica, and cited her music as inspiration for his role as Commander Adama. He also used "Om Hraum Mitraya" from Premal's album Dakshina (2005) in his HBO movie Walkout.

Premal and Miten performed for The Dalai Lama at a 2002 conference in Munich, Germany, on "Unity in Duality". They sang the Tara Mantra, reportedly his favorite.

Premal's Tibetan Mantras for Turbulent Times (2010) was recorded with the Gyuto Monks of Tibet. It features eight mantras each chanted 108 times.

== Music and information ==
Premal and Miten say they use a "natural selection" process to choose mantras for their albums. Premal prefers Sanskrit mantras. She has stated that removing her ego from her understanding of the mantra allows its true meaning to be expressed. She describes their work as being "messengers of a 5,000-year-old tradition." Her vocal range is contralto.

== Discography ==
1. 1997 – Trusting the Silence (with Miten)
2. 1998 – The Essence
3. 1998 – Strength of a Rose (with Miten)
4. 2000 – Love Is Space
5. 2002 – Embrace
6. 2002 – Satsang (with Miten)
7. 2003 – Songs for the Inner Lover (with Miten)
8. 2004 – More Than Music (with Miten)
9. 2005 – Dakshina
10. 2005 – Live in Byron Bay (with Miten)
11. 2007 – Sings the Moola Mantra
12. 2007 – Soul in Wonder (with Miten and Manose)
13. 2008 – Into Silence
14. 2009 – In Concert – The Yoga of Sacred Song and Chant (with Miten and Manose)
15. 2009 – Mantras for Precarious Times
16. 2009 – DevaSonic Vol 1
17. 2009 – DevaSonic Vol 2
18. 2009 – Download Singles (with Miten)
19. 2010 – Into Light
20. 2010 – Tibetan Mantras for Turbulent Times
21. 2011 – Password
22. 2013 – 21-Day Mantra Meditation Journey (with Miten)
23. 2013 – A Deeper Light (with Miten and Manose)
24. 2013 – MantraLove (with Miten)
25. 2014 – Mantras for Life (with Miten and Manose)
26. 2014 – The Spirit of Mantra (21-Day Mantra Meditation Journey, Vol. II) (with Miten)
27. 2015 – Songs for the Sangha (with Miten and Manose)
28. 2016 – Cosmic Connections Live (with Miten and Manose)
29. 2018 – Deva
30. 2022 – Timeless (with Miten)
31. 2024 – All the Birds Fly Home (Live, with Miten)
