= Mark Garnett =

English academic

Mark Garnett is a prolific author and media commentator on British politics, who has taught at several UK universities.

Garnett was educated at Gosforth High School, Newcastle, and Durham University (Grey College).

With Ian Aitken, he was the authorised biographer of Conservative politician William Whitelaw. He was a long-time collaborator with the Conservative cabinet minister, Sir Ian Gilmour, and assisted Sir Edward Heath in the composition of his memoir, The Course of My Life (London: Hodder & Stoughton, 1998).

== Selected Works ==
- (with Ian Gilmour), Whatever Happened to the Tories? (London: Fourth Estate, 1997).
- (with Andrew Denham), British Think Tanks and the Climate of Opinion (London: UCL Press, 1998).
- Alport: A Study in Loyalty, (Teddington: Acumen Publishing, 1999).
- (with Andrew Denham), Keith Joseph: A Life (London: Acumen Press, 2001).
- (with Ian Aitken), Splendid! Splendid! The Authorised Biography of Willie Whitelaw (London: Jonathan Cape, 2002).
- The Snake that Swallowed its Tail: Some contradictions in modern liberalism, (Exeter: Imprint Academic, 2004).
- (with P. Lynch), UK Government and Politics (London: Philip Allan, 2005).
- Principles and Politics in Contemporary Britain (Exeter: Imprint Academic, 2006).
- From Anger to Apathy: The British Experience since 1975 (London: Jonathan Cape, 2007).
- (with K. Hickson), Conservative Thinkers: The Key Contributors to the Political Thought of the Modern Conservative Party (Manchester: Manchester University Press, 2009).
- (with P. Dorey and Andrew Denham), From Crisis to Coalition: the Conservative Party, 1997-2010 (Basingstoke: Palgrave Macmillan, 2011).
- (with P. Lynch), Exploring British Politics. Third Edition (Harlow: Pearson Longman, 2012).
- (with David Denver), British General Elections since 1964: Diversity, Dealignment and Diversity (Oxford: Oxford University Press, 2014).
- (with M. Johnson and D. Walker), Conservatism and Ideology (London: Routledge, 2015).
- (with P. Dorey), The British Coalition Government, 2010-2015: A Marriage of Inconvenience? (London: Palgrave Macmillan, 2016).
- (with S. Mabon and R. Smith), British Foreign Policy Since 1945 (London: Routledge, 2017).
- (ed) Conservative Monents: Reading conservative texts, (London: Bloomsbury), 2018).
- (with D. Leonard), Titans: Fox vs Pitt (I.B Tauris, 2019).
- (ed) The Routledge Handbook of British Politics and Society (London: Routledge, 2020).
- The British Prime Minister in an Age of Upheaval (London: Polity Press, 2021).
- (with D. Denver), British General Elections since 1964: diversity, dealignment and disillusion (Oxford: Oxford University Press, 2nd edition 2021).
- Conservatism: A Short History (Newcastle Upon-Tyne: Agenda, 2023).
- (with G. Hyman and R. Johnson) Keeping the Red Flag Flying: The Labour Party in Opposition since 1922 (London: Polity Press, 2024).
