= Kitarō discography =

Kitaro discography
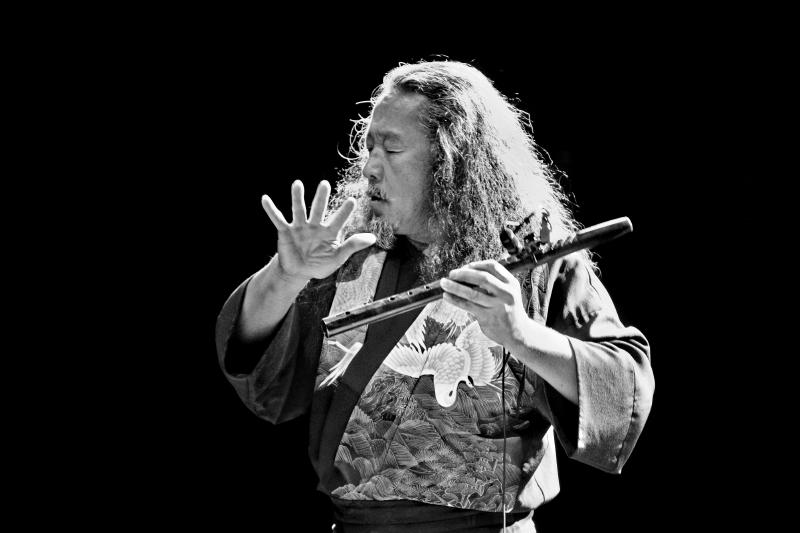
- Kitaro during a 2007 Concert
- Studio albums: 24
- Soundtrack albums: 14
- Live albums: 8
- Compilation albums: 42
- Singles: 7
- Music videos: 9
- Far East Family Band: 4
- Collaborations: 11
- Reissues: 4

Japanese musical artist Kitaro's discography consists of 24 studio albums, 8 live albums, 14 soundtrack albums, and 42 compilation albums. Kitaro's latest project, Symphony Live In Istanbul was nominated for the 57th Annual Grammy Awards, and is Kitaro's 16th Grammy nomination to date.

He also appears in five full-length concert videos and has composed scores for numerous films including Oliver Stone's Heaven & Earth, Impressions of the West Lake, and The Soong Sisters. He won Golden Globe Award Best Original Score for Heaven & Earth and won Golden Horse Award and Hong Kong Film Award for The Soong Sisters (1997).

He has collaborated with various artists including Megadeth's Marty Friedman, Mickey Hart, Philip Glass, Dennis Banks, Jon Anderson of Yes and Jane Zhang, as well as appearing on four Far East Family Band albums.

== Studio albums ==
15 of these studio albums were nominated for a Grammy Award. Thinking of You won a Grammy Award for Best New Age Album in 2000.

Title	Year	Label
Tenkai (a.k.a. Astral Voyage)	1978	Zen/Invitation
Daichi (a.k.a. Full Moon Story)	1979	Zen/Invitation
Oasis	1979	Pony Canyon, Domo Records
Ki	1981	Pony Canyon, Domo Records
Silver Cloud (a.k.a. Cloud)	1983	Polydor/Sound Design Records, Geffen Records
Toward the West (a.k.a. Endless Journey)	1985	Polydor/Sound Design Records, Geffen Records
Tenku	1986	Geffen Records, Domo Records
The Light of the Spirit (with Mickey Hart)	1987	Geffen Records, Domo Records
Kojiki	1990	Geffen Records, Domo Records
Dream (with Jon Anderson)	1992	Geffen Records, Domo Records
Mandala	1994	Domo Records
Peace on Earth (Christmas album)	1996	Domo Records
Cirque Ingenieux	1997	Domo Records
Gaia-Onbashira	1998	Domo Records
Thinking of You	1999	Domo Records
Ancient	2001	Domo Records
An Ancient Journey	2002	Domo Records
Sacred Journey of Ku-Kai Vol. 1	2003	Domo Records
Sacred Journey of Ku-Kai Vol. 2	2005	Domo Records
Spiritual Garden	2006	Domo Records
Sacred Journey of Ku-Kai Vol. 3	2007	Domo Records
Sacred Journey of Ku-Kai Vol. 4	2010	Domo Records
Final Call	2013	Domo Records
Sacred Journey of Ku-Kai Vol. 5	2017	Domo Records

== Soundtracks ==
Impressions of the West Lake is one of the Grammy nominated albums.

Title	Year	Label
Silk Road, Volume 1	1980	Pony Canyon, Domo Records
Silk Road, Volume 2	1980	Pony Canyon, Domo Records
Tonko (a.k.a. Tunhuang, Dunhuang, or Silk Road III)	1981	Pony Canyon, Domo Records
Queen of Millennia (a.k.a. Millennia)	1982	Pony Canyon, Geffen Records
Tenjiku (a.k.a. India or Silk Road IV)	1983	Polydor/Sound Design Records, Geffen Records
Si Shui Liu Nian	1984	–
Manhunter	1986	–
Heaven & Earth (a.k.a. Ten to Chi)	1993	Geffen Records
The Soong Sisters (film)	1998	Domo Records
Ninja Scroll	2003	Domo Records
Toyo's Camera (soundtrack)	2009	Domo Records
Impressions of the West Lake	2009	Domo Records
442 – Live with Honor, Die with Dignity	2010	Domo Records
MIS	2012	Domo Records

== Live albums ==
Title	Year	Label
In Person/In Person Digital	1980	Pony Canyon, Domo Records
Live at Budokan	1982	–
Live in Asia (a.k.a. Asia)	1984	Polydor/Sound Design Records, Westwood Records (Geffen Records)
Live in America	1991	Geffen Records, Domo Records
An Enchanted Evening	1995	Domo Records
Daylight, Moonlight: Kitaro Live in Yakushiji	2002	Domo Records
Tamayura	2013	Domo Records
Symphony Live in Istanbul	2014	Domo Records
Zen: Live In Katsuyama	2024	Domo Records
Kukai 1250: Live In Zentsuji	2024	Domo Records

== Compilation albums ==
Title	Year	Label
Best of Kitaro, Volume 1	1981	Pony Canyon, Domo Records
My Best	1986	Pony Canyon, Domo Records
The Best of Ten Years (1976–1986)	1988	Geffen Records, Domo Records
Best Collection	1990	Pony Canyon
Tokusen II (CD 1 Best Of, CD 2 Live in Osaka)	1994	–
The Best of Kitaro	1995	Geffen Records
Romantic Ballads	1998	–
Music for the Spirit, Volume 1	1998	Domo Records
Six Musical Portraits (Best Of)	1998	Domo Records
Noah's Ark (Japan only)	1998	Westwood Records
Music for the Spirit, Volume 2	1999	Domo Records
Best of Kitaro, Volume 2	1999	Domo Records
The Essential Collection (Japan only)	2000	–
Music for the Spirit, Volume 3	2001	Domo Records
Endless Journey (Best Of)	2001	Sony
Healing Forest (Best Of)	2001	3D
Music for the Spirit, Volume 4	2002	Domo Records
Journey to the Heart, Volume 1	2002	Domo Records
Journey to the Heart, Volume 2	2002	Domo Records
Journey to the Heart, Volume 3	2002	Domo Records
Journey to the Heart, Volume 4	2002	Domo Records
Asian Café / Ashu Chakan (Best Of)	2002	Sony/Columbia
Mizu ni Inorite	2002	Domo Records
Best of Silk Road	2003	Domo Records
Sleep, Volume 1	2004	Domo Records
Shikoku 88 Places	2004	Columbia Japan
The Most Relaxing New Age Music in the Universe	2005	Kin-Kou
The Essential Kitaro	2006	Domo Records
Music for Yoga	2007	Domo Records
The Definitive Collection	2008	Domo Records
Sleep, Volume 2	2009	Domo Records
Kitaro: Digital Box Set	2009	Domo Records
Grammy Nominated	2010	Domo Records
Celestial Scenery: Silk Road Legend, Volume 1	2011	Domo Records
Celestial Scenery: Silent Praying, Volume 2	2011	Domo Records
Celestial Scenery: Faraway Land, Volume 3	2011	Domo Records
Celestial Scenery: Eternal Trip, Volume 4	2011	Domo Records
Celestial Scenery: Holy Vibration, Volume 5	2011	Domo Records
Celestial Scenery: Breezing Universe, Volume 6	2011	Domo Records
Celestial Scenery: Fairy Stories, Volume 7	2011	Domo Records
Celestial Scenery: Divine Spirit, Volume 8	2011	Domo Records
Celestial Scenery: Galactic Flight, Volume 9	2011	Domo Records
Celestial Scenery: Heart Beat, Volume 10	2011	Domo Records
The Ultimate Kitaro Collection: Silk Road Journey	2012	Domo Records
The Kitaro Quintessential	2013	Domo Records
Asian Café	2016	Domo Records

== Singles ==
Title	Year	Label
"Utopia" (a.k.a. "Radio House Ginga")	1981	–
"Angel Queen" (from Queen Millennia, vocals by Dara Sedaka)	1982	Geffen Records
"Portopia '81/Portpier Matsushita Kan" (included in Noah's Ark)	1983	–
"Aura no Saiten"	1983	–
Four Seasons of Quality (EP)	1984	–
"Caravan" (vocals by Pages)	1984	Polydor
"Lady of Dreams" (from Dream, vocals by Jon Anderson)	1992	Geffen Records, Domo Records
"Nile (from Ancient)	2000	Domo Records

== Music videos ==
Title	Year	Label
Kojiki: A Story in Concert	1987	Geffen Records, Domo Records
The Light of the Spirit	1987	Geffen Records, Domo Records
Live in America	1991	Geffen Records, Domo Records
An Enchanted Evening	1995	Domo Records
Tamayura	2000	Domo Records
Thinking of You	2001	Domo Records
Peace on Earth	2001	Domo Records
The Best of Kitaro	2001	Domo Records
Daylight Moonlight: Live in Yakushiji	2003	Domo Records

== Far East Family Band ==
Title	Year	Label
The Cave Down to the Earth	1975	Phoenix Records
Nipponjin	1975	Phoenix Records
Parallel World	1976	Phoenix Records

== Collaborations ==
Title	Year	Label
Hako Yamasaki – "Akane" (released as a single)	–	–
Motoyoshi Iwasaki – "Aoi Kaze" (released as a single)	–	–
Silk Road Suite (conducted by Paul Buckmaster with the London Symphony Orchestra)	1980	Pony Canyon, Domo Records
World of Kitaro (conducted by Jeremy Lubbock with London National Philharmonic Orchestra)	1982	Pony Canyon, Domo Records
Gyuto Monks – Freedom Chants from the Roof of the World (with Philip Glass & Mickey Hart)	1988	–
Marty Friedman – Scenes, produced by Kitaro	1992	Shrapnel Records
Nawang Khechog – Karuna, produced by Kitaro	1995	Domo Records
Kitaro's World of Music featuring Yu-Xiao Guang	1996	Domo Records
Peter McEvilley & Rachel Leslie – Ninja Scroll (soundtrack)	2003	Domo Records
Ryuta Yoshimura – Hayazaki no Hana (soundtrack)	2006	–
Let Mother Earth Speak (with Dennis Banks)	2012	Domo Records

== Reissues ==
Title	Year	Label
Daylight, Moonlight: Live in Yakushiji (SACD)	2003	Domo Records
Kojiki (SACD)	2003	Domo Records
Sacred Journey of Ku-Kai Vol. 1 (SACD)	2003	Domo Records
The Light of the Spirit (Reissue)	2012	Domo Records
Thinking Of You (Remastered)	2014	Domo Records
Kojiki (Remastered)	2015	Domo Records
Tenku (Remastered)	2016	Domo Records
