= Grammy Nominated (Kitaro) =

Compilation album by Kitarō
- Released: 2010
- Genre: New-age

Grammy Nominated is a compilation album by new age artist Kitarō. It has 13 tracks from each of his Grammy-nominated albums.

== Track listing ==
1. Spirit Of The West Lake (from Impressions of the West Lake)
2. Estrella (from Thinking Of You)
3. Itonami (from Ancient)
4. As The Wind Blows (from Sacred Journey of Ku-Kai, Volume 2)
5. The Field (from The Light Of The Spirit)
6. Koi (from Kojiki)
7. Main Theme Nile, Version II (from An Ancient Journey)
8. A Passage Of Life (from Dream)
9. Into The Forest (from Sacred Journey of Ku-Kai, Volume 3)
10. Dance Of Sarasvati (from Mandala)
11. Kuu (from Sacred Journey of Ku-Kai, Volume 1）
12. Misty (from Gaia-Onbashira)
13. Heaven And Earth (from An Enchanted Evening)

== See also ==
- Kitarō discography – Compilation albums
