= Sacred Journey of Ku-Kai =

Sacred Journey of Ku-Kai is a series of peace-themed albums by new age artist Kitarō, inspired by the classic Buddhist pilgrimage to the 88 sacred temples on Japan's island of Shikoku (see Shikoku Pilgrimage). Each album in the series has been nominated for a Grammy Award for Best New Age Album.

== Sacred Journey of Ku-Kai Vol. 1 (2003) ==
Sacred Journey of Ku-Kai Vol.1

Studio album by Kitarō
- Released: September 9, 2003
- Genre: New-age
- Length: 68:36
- Label: Domo Records
- Producer: Kitarō, Gary Barlough

Kitarō chronology
| Daylight, Moonlight: Kitaro Live In Yakushiji (2002) | Sacred Journey of Ku-Kai Vol.1 (2003) | Sacred Journey of Ku-Kai, Vol. 2 (2005) |

All tracks are written by Kitarō

| No. | Title | Length |
|---|---|---|
| 1. | "Michi" | 7:46 |
| 2. | "Kagero" | 5:19 |
| 3. | "Shizuku" | 5:20 |
| 4. | "Flow" | 5:08 |
| 5. | "Nen" | 4:44 |
| 6. | "The Wind" | 4:57 |
| 7. | "Gi" | 5:05 |
| 8. | "Evening Sun" | 4:52 |
| 9. | "Silence" | 6:12 |
| 10. | "Earth In Bloom" | 7:44 |
| 11. | "Kuu" | 5:04 |
| 12. | "Cocoro" | 6:25 |

== Sacred Journey of Ku-Kai Vol. 2 (2005) ==
Sacred Journey of Ku-Kai Vol.2

Studio album by Kitarō
- Released: February 22, 2005
- Genre: New-age
- Length: 56:21
- Label: Domo Records
- Producer: Kitarō, Gary Barlough

Kitarō chronology
| Sacred Journey of Ku-Kai, Vol. 1 (2003) | Sacred Journey of Ku-Kai Vol.2 (2005) | Spiritual Garden (2006) |

All tracks are written by Kitarō

| No. | Title | Length |
|---|---|---|
| 1. | "Shining Spirit Of Water" | 5:33 |
| 2. | "As The Wind Blows" | 5:01 |
| 3. | "Koki" | 4:48 |
| 4. | "Kan-non" | 5:10 |
| 5. | "Whispering Earth" | 6:28 |
| 6. | "Inner Lights" | 6:34 |
| 7. | "Dancing Flower" | 4:48 |
| 8. | "Floating Lotus" | 5:30 |
| 9. | "Peaceful Valley" | 5:07 |
| 10. | "Crystal Field" | 4:53 |
| 11. | "Ritual Waves" | 4:29 |

=== Charts ===
| Chart (2005) | Peak position |
|---|---|
| Billboard Top New Age Albums | 15 |

== Sacred Journey of Ku-Kai Vol. 3 (2007) ==
Sacred Journey of Ku-Kai Vol.3

Studio album by Kitarō
- Released: September 25, 2007
- Genre: New-age
- Length: 60:49
- Label: Domo Records
- Producer: Kitarō

Kitarō chronology
| Spiritual Garden (2006) | Sacred Journey of Ku-Kai Vol.3 (2007) | Toyo's Camera (2009) |

All tracks are written by Kitarō

| No. | Title | Length |
|---|---|---|
| 1. | "Sky And Ocean" | 8:58 |
| 2. | "Crystal Winds" | 6:20 |
| 3. | "After The Rain" | 7:32 |
| 4. | "Sacred Fountain" | 7:02 |
| 5. | "Winds Blow Over The Hill" | 6:31 |
| 6. | "Into The Forest" | 5:45 |
| 7. | "Voice In Blue" | 8:04 |
| 8. | "Circle Dance" | 10:51 |

== Sacred Journey of Ku-Kai Vol. 4 (2010) ==
Sacred Journey of Ku-Kai Vol.4

Studio album by Kitarō
- Released: September 14, 2010
- Genre: New-age
- Length: 57:46
- Label: Domo Records
- Producer: Kitarō

Kitarō chronology
| Impressions of the West Lake (2009) | Sacred Journey of Ku-Kai Vol.4 (2010) | 442 – Extreme Patriots of WWII: Kitaro's Story Scape (2010) |

All tracks are written by Kitarō

| No. | Title | Length |
|---|---|---|
| 1. | "Lotus Mountain" | 9:04 |
| 2. | "Yakushi" | 8:32 |
| 3. | "Magic Seeds" | 8:39 |
| 4. | "Reflection Of Water" | 7:06 |
| 5. | "South Wind" | 5:30 |
| 6. | "Circle Pray" | 7:16 |
| 7. | "Requiem" | 7:45 |
| 8. | "Ritual Winds" | 4:17 |

== Sacred Journey of Ku-Kai Vol. 5 (2017) ==
Sacred Journey of Ku-Kai Vol.5

Studio album by Kitarō
- Released: April 21, 2017
- Genre: New-age
- Length: 60:17
- Label: Domo Records
- Producer: Kitarō

Kitarō chronology
| Final Call (2013) | Sacred Journey of Ku-Kai Vol.5 (2017) |

All tracks are written by Kitarō

| No. | Title | Length |
|---|---|---|
| 1. | "Soul from Ocean" | 5:57 |
| 2. | "Breath of Light" | 6:30 |
| 3. | "Reflection of the Heart" | 5:36 |
| 4. | "Wave Rotation" | 5:02 |
| 5. | "Time and Space Cry" | 6:11 |
| 6. | "Sea of Clouds" | 6:44 |
| 7. | "Floating Lotus Flower" | 4:15 |
| 8. | "Wind Invitation" | 7:59 |
| 9. | "Journey for Nirvana" | 6:47 |
| 10. | "Water Miracle" | 5:16 |

== Awards and nominations ==
| Year | Award | Result |
|---|---|---|
| 2004 | Grammy Award for Best New Age Album | Nominated |
| 2006 | Grammy Award for Best New Age Album | Nominated |
| 2008 | Grammy Award for Best New Age Album | Nominated |
| 2011 | Grammy Award for Best New Age Album | Nominated |
| 2017 | Grammy Award for Best New Age Album | Nominated |

== Personnel ==
- Kitaro - Producer, Composer, Arranger, Engineer, Mixing, Keyboards, Photography
- Gary Barlough - Producer (V.1), Engineer (V.2)
- Allen Sides - Engineer (V.1)
- Doug Sax - Mastering (V.1, 2, 3)
- Joe Chiccarelli - Engineer (V.2)
- Robert Hadley - Mastering (V.2)
- Randy Miller - Orchestration (V.3), Arranger (V.3)
- Steven Miller - Engineer (V.3)
- Ian Ulibarri - Engineer (V.3)
- Timothy Beach - Engineer (V.4)
- Tim Gennert - Mastering (V.4)
- Paul Lamb - Mastering (V.5), Engineer (V.5)

Musicians

- Kristin Stordahl Kanda - Flute (V.1, 2)
- Rie Shimomura - Violin (V.1)
- Tu Shang Xian - Pipa (V.1, 2)
- Jonathan Goldman - Chanting (V.2)
- Paul Pesco - Guitars (V.2, 3)
- Franci Miho Shimomaebara - Vocals (V.2)
- Nawang Khechog - Tibetan Flute & Chanting Voice (V.2)
- Keiko Takahashi - Keyboards (V.2, 3, 4), Composer (V.3), Arranger (V.3)
- Masayuki Koga - Shakuhachi (V.3)
- Alexander Adhami - Cello, Santoor, Guitar, Ebow, Flute (V.3, 4)
- Steven Kindler: Violin (V.4)
- Diana Dentino: Keyboards (V.4)
- Voyce McGinley: Percussion (V.4)
- Shinji Ebihara (V.5)

Additional Personnel

- Eiichi Naito - Producer, Executive Producer, Management
- Dino Malito - Artists & Repertoire, Management
- Howard Sapper - Business & Legal Affairs
- Tatsuya Hayashi - Marketing (V.1, 2)
- Hitoshi Saito - Marketing (V.3, 4)
- Atsuko Mizuta - Marketing (V.4)
- Kio Griffith - Art Direction, Design
