= The Surfers =

The Surfers may refer to:

- The Surfers (Dutch group), a Dutch pop music band
- The Surfers (Singaporean band), a Singaporean band
