= The Most Relaxing New Age Music in the Universe =

Compilation album by Various Artists
- Released: January 11, 2005
- Genre: New-age
- Length: 120:43
- Label: Kin-Kou

The Most Relaxing New Age Music in the Universe is a two-disk album of new-age music produced by Kin-Kou Music under Savoy Label Group and first released on January 11, 2005. Each disk contains 12 tracks arranged and performed by various artists. The album reached number six in top New Age album charts in 2005, and was on the Billboard charts in that genre for 40 weeks. It was followed by several more albums: More of the Most Relaxing New Age Music in the Universe (July 2005), The Ultimate Most Relaxing New Age Music in the Universe (June 2006), and The Best of the Most Relaxing New Age Music in the Universe (October 2012). Each contained music by many of the same artists and was produced under the same label.

== Track listing ==
Disk 1
No.	Title	Writer(s)	Length
1.	"Message from the Cosmos"	Kitaro	5:45
2.	"Water Mark"	Mari Fujiwara	2:06
3.	"White Fantasy"	Toshiyuki Watanabe	4:41
4.	"Calmness"	Hideo Shimazu	4:20
5.	"The Field"	Kitaro	4:53
6.	"Japanese Roots"	TakeDake with Neptune	7:35
7.	"Borobudur"	Febian Reza Pane	6:53
8.	"A White Pass to the Creek"	Manabu Ohishi	5:08
9.	"Shimmering Horizon"	Kitaro	4:48
10.	"The Wind Forest from "My Neighbor Totoro""	Mari Fujiwara	4:43
11.	"Kingdom"	Keiichi Oku	6:08
12.	"Spring Prayer"	Hideo Shimazu	4:32

Disk 2
No.	Title	Writer(s)	Length
1.	"The Wind"	Kitaro	4:57
2.	"Slipping into April"	Hideo Shimazu	5:10
3.	"Glittering Green"	Manabu Ohishi	5:33
4.	"Korea Idea"	TakeDake with Neptune	4:46
5.	"Sheep, Cloud and Wind"	Keiichi Uko	3:39
6.	"Crescent"	Makoto Hirahara	5:34
7.	"Evening Sun"	Kitaro	4:53
8.	"Children's Dream"	Toshiyuki Watanabe	4:44
9.	"Walking in the Air from "Snow Man""	Mari Fujiwara	4:37
10.	"Taklamakan Desert"	Kitaro	5:09
11.	"Java"	TakeDake with Neptune	5:57
12.	"Icarus"	Mari Fujiwara	4:12
