= Truck (Singaporean band) =

- Origin: Singapore
- Genres: Rock, pop
- Years active: 1970s
- Labels: Baal, Baal Records, Guerssen Records
- Spinoff of: The October Cherries
- Past members: Peter Diaz; Richard Khan; Jeremiah "Jay" Shotam

Truck was a spinoff of Singapore pop rock band The October Cherries, consisting of three of its members, vocalist/bassist Jeremiah "Jay" Shotam, guitarist Peter Diaz, and drummer Richard Khan. Their only release, Surprise, Surprise, was issued on Jay's brother Balram's label, Baal Records in 1974. Like the October Cherries, it was influenced by The Beatles, but with heavier psychedelic leanings.

== Background ==
According to the "Surprise, Surprise - it's all about Truck" Lion City Rock Episode 54 on (Dec 13, 2022) Red Circle, the members of Truck were, Jay Shotam, Benny Siew and Richard Khan.

The "A Trip Around the World" article in Record Collector magazine, 06 August 2011, says that the tracks on the album were previously used backing tracks from past October Cherries recordings. New overdubs of vocals, guitars and synthesizers were added by Richard Khan and Benny Siew. The result was a new album with a somewhat psychedelic feeling.

Given that this album was released during Singapore's clampdown period of the early-to-mid 70s, which drastically hindered local distribution and media coverage of what was deemed "Yellow Culture" (including hard rock, heavy metal and/or psychedelic-oriented rock music), the album sold poorly and quickly fell into obscurity. According to Jay Shotam, it would subsequently be heavily pirated over the years, although exact sales figures, authentic or not, aren't known.

== Later years ==
Surprise, Surprise was officially re-issued on CD and LP by Spanish label Guerssen Records in 2004, albeit with scarce, inaccurate information, including that the band is from Malaysia and that the exact names and roles of the band are unknown. According to the February 23rd, 2011 article about the album on The Rising Storm, the vocals were reminiscent of Graham Nash, it was a superbly crafted record, and the most surprising thing was how consistent the songs were.

Truck was the subject of the Lion City Rock Episode 54, published on Dec 13, 2022.

== Discography ==
=== Single ===
- Col Truck - "You're All I Need" / "One Fine Day" - Baal BDN 38031 - 1976
- Truck with Hey Ho - "Mrs. Vanderbilt" / Truck - "Love Song" - Baal BDN 38036 - 1976

=== Album ===
- Truck, Surprise! Surprise! - Baal Records BRC 2011, 1974
- Col Truck, One Fine Day - Baal BAL 89001 - 1976
- Truck, Surprise, Surprise, Guerssen Records GUESS 002CD (CD reissue)
