= Kyle Abbott (shamisen player) =

American shamisen player and author

- Born: Kyle Miro Abbott; Santa Cruz, California
- Occupations: Shamisen player, teacher, and author
- Known for: Kubo and the Two Strings
- Notable work: Shamisen of Japan: The Definitive Guide to Tsugaru Shamisen
- Spouse: Su Bunjamin
- Parents: Carl Abbott (father); Leslie Abbott (mother)

Kyle Abbott is an American shamisen player, author, and the founder of Bachido, an international shamisen community. His debut book Shamisen of Japan: The Definitive Guide to Tsugaru Shamisen was published through CreateSpace in 2009, and has produced multiple albums featuring the instrument. He is also recognized for providing live shamisen performances to support the animators of the 2015 animated film Kubo and the Two Strings, helping them understand how the instrument is played in real life.

== Early life ==
Abbott was born to Leslie and Carl Abbott and raised in Santa Cruz, California, where his musical journey began at a young age. He started learning the mandolin at age seven, and in the following years, he also learned to play the guitar, banjo, violin, and bass. These early musical experiences provided a strong foundation for his later work with the shamisen, which he began playing at the age of 13. Abbott's family also contributed to his development as a music instructor by teaching bluegrass workshops for beginners.

He has a brother and lives in Santa Cruz, California with his wife, Su Bunjamin.

== Career ==
In 2010, Abbott travelled to Japan to compete in the National Hirosaki Tsugaru Shamisen Tournament. The following year, he founded Bachido, the world's first international shamisen community, which connects enthusiasts globally and provides educational resources, workshops, and opportunities for collaboration. Membership has grown to over 3,000 participants worldwide. In 2009, he published Shamisen of Japan: The Definitive Guide to Tsugaru Shamisen, a comprehensive manual to help others construct and play their own shamisen.

Abbott has also led shamisen workshops in the United States, Japan, and Europe and established a local shamisen group in California. In 2015, he founded the world’s first international shamisen workshop series in Japan, which attracted top instructors to inspire players globally.

In April 2019, Abbott provided lessons on the Japanese shamisen, a traditional three-stringed instrument, at the Japantown Immersive event in San Jose.

== Recordings and albums ==
Abbott has recorded and produced several albums, including two solo projects, The Cuckoo and Frosty: A Retrospective Christmas. Additionally, he contributed to and produced multiple albums with the ensemble Monsters of Shamisen. He was also a member of The Abbott Brothers, a band he formed with his brother Luke Abbott and released their debut EP, Trifecta, in July 2012. The group features Mason Hutchinson on bass and occasional guest musicians. Abbott and his brother also used to perform with their parents as part of "The Abbott Family Band".

- 2012, Trifecta (EP)
- 2013, Stellar (producer, shamisen, vocals, mandolin, percussion, morinhoor, doshpuluur)
- 2014, Resonance (producer, shamisen, vocals, cello, taiko, morinhoor)
- 2014, The Cuckoo (producer, vocals, guitar, mandolin, shamisen, bass, ukulele, fiddle, banjo)
- 2016, Frosty: A Retrospective Christmas (producer, vocals, guitar, mandolyain, bass, shamisen)
- 2018, California Dreams (producer, shamisen, mandolin, guitar)

== Awards and recognition ==
He participated in the Solo division C Class at the National Tsugaru Shamisen Tournaments in Hirosaki, and Solo Division B Class in Kanagi in 2010, representing the international shamisen community and received the Judge’s Special Award. In 2013 and 2014, he formed a team of 16 Bachido members and traveled to Japan to compete in the Group Division A Class, where they achieved third place and first place, respectively. In 2019, he returned to the World Tsugaru Shamisen Tournament in Hirosaki, competing in the Solo Division A Class, where he once again received the Judge’s Special Award. In 2015, he worked on the animated movie Kubo and the Two Strings, where his live shamisen performances were recorded to help animators depict the instrument's movement and sound authentically.

Abbott also founded ShamiCamp, the first international shamisen workshop series which brings together renowned shamisen instructors and has been held in cities such as Tokyo, Berlin, Sapporo, and California.

== Collaborations ==
He has collaborated with several artists, including Kenny Endo, John Neptune, Kevin Kmetz, Masahiro Nitta, and Reigen Fujii.

== Bibliography ==
- Abbott, Kyle (11 October 2012). Shamisen of Japan: The Definitive Guide to Tsugaru Shamisen. CreateSpace Independent Publishing Platform. ISBN 978-1-4800-6445-4.
