= Nao Watanabe =

Japanese singer signed with Domo Records

- Origin: Japan
- Genres: Pop/Indie
- Years active: 2006–current
- Label: Domo Records
- Website: Official Websites (Japan)

Nao Watanabe (渡邊奈央) is a Japanese singer signed with Domo Records.

== Life ==
Nao Watanabe's musical influence was provided by her mother, who loves music. Watanabe began taking classical piano lessons when she was five and began giving live performances when she was 18 years old.

Her song "Invoice" reached the top 10 in the Independent Chart of a cable broadcasting in Japan.

== Influences ==
Watanabe's met her favorite musician, Kitaro, when she was performing at the live house in Tokyo. Later, she was offered a contract with Domo Records.

In 2005, she recorded her new album in Los Angeles.

== Discography ==
International album

- Nao Watanabe

Japanese album

- SACHI
