= Spiritual Garden =

Studio album by Kitarō
- Released: February 21, 2006
- Genre: New-age
- Length: 56:53
- Label: Domo Records, Inc
- Producer: Kitarō

Kitarō chronology
Sacred Journey of Ku-Kai Vol. 2 (2005)	Spiritual Garden (2006)	The Essential Kitarō (2006)

Spiritual Garden is an album by Kitarō, inspired by the Harupin-Ha Butoh Dance of Koichi Tamano. It also features Kitaro's first collaboration with wife, Keiko Takahashi.

== Track listing ==
All tracks are written by Kitaro and Keiko Takahashi

No.	Title	Composer	Length
1.	"Gentle Forest"	Kitaro, Keiko Takahashi	3:41
2.	"The Stone And The Green World"	Kitaro, Keiko Takahashi	8:43
3.	"Sunlight Dancing"	Kitaro, Keiko Takahashi	10:13
4.	"Moon Flower"	Kitaro, Keiko Takahashi	3:12
5.	"Wind And Water"	Kitaro, Keiko Takahashi	5:21
6.	"Moon Shadow"	Kitaro, Keiko Takahashi	3:40
7.	"Love For Elka"	Kitaro, Keiko Takahashi	5:30
8.	"Hydrosphere"	Kitaro, Keiko Takahashi	3:10
9.	"Quasar"	Kitaro, Keiko Takahashi	6:50
10.	"White Night"	Kitaro, Keiko Takahashi	1:56
11.	"Spiritual Garden"	Kitaro, Keiko Takahashi	4:37

== Charts ==
Chart (2006)	Peak position
Top New Age Albums (Billboard)	7

== Personnel ==
- Kitaro - Keyboards, Producer, Engineer, Mixing
- Keiko Takahashi - Keyboards
- Paul Pesco - Guitars
- Gary Barlough - Engineer
- Alan Mason - Mix
- Doug Sax - Mastering
- Robert Hadley - Mastering

Additional Personnel

- Eiichi Naito - Executive Producer, Management
- Dino Malito - A&R, Management
- Howard Sapper - Business & Legal Affairs
- Hitoshi Saito - Marketing
- Kio Griffith - Art Direction, Design
