= Karjam Saeji =

Tibetan singer/songwriter/dancer

Karsangjamtso "Karjam" Saeji
- Origin: Maqu County, Gansu Province, China
- Genres: New-age, Traditional, World
- Years active: 1991 - Present
- Website: www.karjamsaeji.com

Karjam Saeji is a Tibetan singer/songwriter/dancer from the grasslands near Maqu in Gansu Province in China. He performed with the Gannan Tibetan Performance Troupe, from Gannan Tibetan Autonomous Prefecture from 1991 and moved to the United States in 2007. He recorded a CD, Pilgrimage, in 2007 as part of the Lopez Artist Advance Project, on Lopez Island in Washington state. The executive producers of "Pilgrimage" were Lenedra Carroll (formerly manager for Jewel) and Michele and Steve Heller. The producer was Ralf Illenberger.

== Biography ==
Karjam was one of the invited performers for the 2008 World Festival of Sacred Music held in Los Angeles, California. "Pilgrimage" was nominated in 2009 for the Just Plain Folks music awards, the largest independent music awards in the world, as were two of the singles off the album, "Danlih" and "Nehnijih Lirang". On August 28, 2009 at the awards show they announced that Karjam won the Asian Album award for "Pilgrimage" and was the first runner-up for the Best Asian Song with "Danlih". In 2010 he appeared at the Seattle Folklife Festival and was honored to be included in the Northwest Roots and Grooves CD that included some of the best music from the festival. He also performed at Northwest Folklife in 2012 and 2013. In 2011, he performed again at the World Festival of Sacred Music in Los Angeles.

== Awards and recognition ==
He was nominated for the 2011 Independent Music Awards best traditional world music album for his 2011 CD, "Tibet in my Heart." This CD, recorded in Seoul, Korea, includes a mix of traditional acoustic instruments from around the world with guest performances by Philip Graulty of Los Angeles Electric 8, well known Korean percussionist Go Seokjin (who often accompanies Jang Sa-ik, and a host of other friends including Karjam's childhood schoolmate and exceptional vocalist Samkuchet. One of Karjam's songs was included on the CD "Tribal Beats: Music for the Strange and Beautiful Vol. 3" curated by Bellydance sensation April Rose.

Karjam is known for his strong singing voice, frequently singing a cappella. He also accompanies himself with the bouzouki, the Tibetan dranyen, and sometimes on the mandolin and banjo.

Karjam joins a fairly large group of musicians in the Tibetan tradition now active in the West, including singer Techung, singer Yungchen Lhamo, singer Phurbu T Namgyal, flautist Nawang Khechog and Jewish-American performer Amalia Rubin.

== Partial discography ==
Album Information
Pilgrimage
- Released: 2007
Tibet in my Heart
- Released: 2011
