= Peace on Earth (Kitaro album) =

Studio album by Kitaro
- Released: 1996, re-released in 2011
- Genre: New-age
- Length: 55:17
- Label: Domo Records
- Producer: Kitaro

Kitaro chronology
Mandala (1994)	Peace on Earth (1996)	Cirque Ingenieux (1997)

Professional ratings
Review scores
Source	Rating
AllMusic	3/5 stars

Peace on Earth is a Kitaro album of classic Christmas songs taken from cultures around the world. It was released by Domo Records in 1996 and reissued in 2011. The reissue includes a DVD of nature visuals synchronized to music from the album. Peace on Earth peaked at number 4 on the Billboard Top New Age Albums Chart in December 1996.

== Track listing ==
All songs are traditional, except "The Great Spirit", which was composed by Kitaro.

No.	Title	Length
1.	"Jesu, Joy Of Man's Desiring"	4:46
2.	"Silent Night"	4:23
3.	"Angels We Have Heard On High"	5:39
4.	"Joy To The World / The First Noel"	4:36
5.	"Little Drummer Boy"	5:57
6.	"Jingle Bells"	3:39
7.	"Rosa Mystica"	2:57
8.	"It Came Upon A Midnight Clear"	4:00
9.	"God Rest Ye Merry Gentlemen"	3:50
10.	"A La Nanita Nana"	5:14
11.	"O Holy Night"	4:56
12.	"The Great Spirit"	5:20

== Personnel ==
- Kitaro : producer, lead synthesizers, Hammond organ, electric guitar, taiko, gong, beam
- Annamaria Karacson : violin
- Gyongyver Petheo : violin
- Daniel Flick : viola
- Kevin Johnson : cello
- Kristen Stordahl Kanda : flute, music contracting
- Pamela Eldridge : harp
- Massito : guitar
- Derek Zimmerman : percussion
- Keith Heffner : keyboards
- Gary Barlough : producer, engineer, synclavier and analog keyboards
- International Peace Choir
- David Holtom : vocal solo on "Little Drummer Boy"
- Massito : guitar arrangement on "A La Nanita Nana"
- Peter R. Kelsey : engineer
- Steve Mixdorf : assistant engineer
- Daijiro Miyazawa : assistant engineer
- Doug Sax : mastering engineer
- Gavin Lurssen : mastering engineer
- Dino Malito : mastering engineer (re-issue)
- Keith Heffner : arranger, conductor
- Music contracting : Kristen Stordahl Kanda

Additional personnel

- Eiichi Naito : executive producer, management
- Dino Malito : artists & repertoire, management
- Howard Sapper : business & legal affairs
- Hitoshi Saito : marketing
- Kio Griffith/ 9rpm.com : art direction and design (2012 version)
- Art Slave : art direction and design (1995 version)
- Uniphoto Picture Agency : front cover photography
- Steve Burns : International Peace Choir photography

== Charts ==
Chart (1996)	Peak position
The Billboard 200	185
Billboard Heatseekers Albums	8
Billboard Top New Age Albums	4
