= Nawang Khechog =

Tibetan flute player and composer

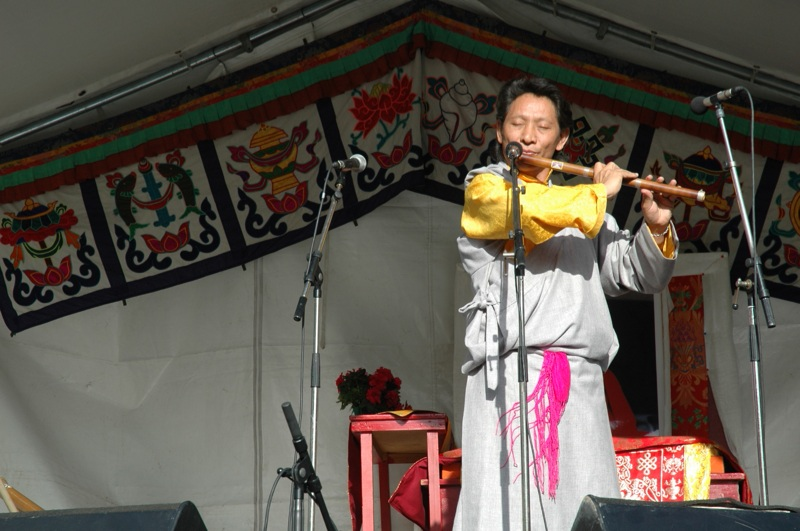
- Nawang Khechog at the Festival culturel du Tibet et des peuples de l'Himalaya, 19 September 2004

Background information
- Origin: Lhasa, Tibet
- Occupation: Musician
- Instrument: Flute
- Website: nawangkhechogmusic.com

Nawang Khechog (Tibetan: ངག་དབང་མཁས་མཆོག་, Wylie: Nga-dbang Mkhas-mchog; also known as Nawang Khechong) is a Tibetan flute player and composer.

Nawang was born in Tibet, but following the Chinese invasion of 1949/1950, his family moved to India, where Nawang studied meditation and Buddhist philosophy. He spent eleven years as a monk, including four years as a hermit meditating in the Himalayan foothills under the guidance of the Dalai Lama.

A self-taught musician, Nawang's expression springs from his emotions and his life experience traveling the world as a Tibetan nomad. In 1986, he emigrated to Australia, where he first performed, and his recordings achieved bestseller status. Nawang is best known for his collaborations with Kitaro, including performances on Kitaro's Grammy-nominated Enchanted Evening and Mandala albums. He has received international acclaim for his live performances with Philip Glass, Paul Winter, Laurie Anderson, Paul Simon, Natalie Merchant, R. Carlos Nakai, and Babatunde Olatunji. On July 31, 1999, Nawang performed with the band Phish during their encore at the Fuji Rock Festival in Niigata, Japan.

Nawang is part of a fairly large group of musicians in the Tibetan tradition now active in the West, including singer Techung, singer Karjam Saeji, singer Phurbu T Namgyal, singer Yungchen Lhamo, singer Amchok Gompo Dhondup and Jewish-American Tibetan-genre performer Amalia Rubin.
