= Gaia-Onbashira =

Studio album by Kitarō
- Released: May 19, 1998
- Genre: New age
- Length: 49:16
- Label: Domo
- Producer: Kitarō

Kitarō chronology
Cirque Ingenieux (1997)	Gaia-Onbashira (1998)	Best Of Kitaro Vol. 2 (1999)

Professional ratings
Review scores
Source	Rating
Allmusic	3/5 stars

Gaia-Onbashira is an album by the new age artist Kitarō. It was nominated for the Grammy Award for Best New Age Album in 1998.

== Track listing ==
All tracks are written by Kitaro

Title
No.	Title	Length
1.	"Yamadashi"	13:27
2.	"Misty"	4:13
3.	"Gaia"	7:11
4.	"Wood Fairy"	5:34
5.	"Satobiki"	9:21
6.	"Kiotoshi"	9:30

== Charts ==
Year	Chart	Position
1998	Top New Age Albums (Billboard magazine)	9
