= FitGirl Repacks =

Distributor of pirated video games

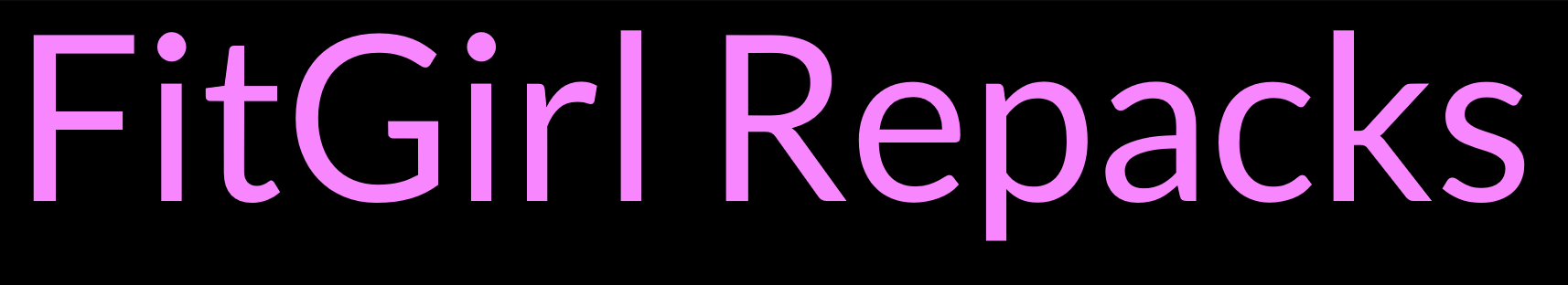
- Website type: Magnet links provider, peer-to-peer
- Founded: July 6, 2016
- Country of origin: Latvia (claimed)
- Revenue: Donations
- Website: fitgirl-repacks.site

FitGirl Repacks is a website distributing pirated video games. FitGirl Repacks is known for "repacking" games – compressing them significantly so that they can be downloaded‚ played and shared more efficiently. TorrentFreak listed FitGirl Repacks at sixth in 2024 and at ninth in 2020's Top 10 Most Popular Torrent Sites lists.

FitGirl, the creator of the site, does not crack games; instead, she uses existing game installers or pirated game files like releases from the warez scene and repacks them to a significantly smaller download size. The repacked games, usually limited to Microsoft Windows, are distributed using file hosting services and BitTorrent. They are generally accompanied during installation by the song "Solo" by RiveR, a remix of "Tsuki Sayu Yoru" by Hiromitsu Agatsuma.

The mascot of FitGirl Repacks is the French actress Audrey Tautou as she appears in the 2001 movie Le fabuleux destin d'Amélie Poulain, a French romantic comedy directed by Jean-Pierre Jeunet.

== History ==
In 2012, FitGirl started compressing game files for sharing with friends. After realizing that public repacks on pirating sites were smaller than her initial repacks, she decided to learn how to optimize her own compression. When her repacks became more optimized than the ones already available, she decided to start sharing them. The first one she shared was a repack of Geometry Wars 3: Dimensions on Russian trackers on July 6, 2016. Her repacks grew in popularity; in 2020 TorrentFreak described her as "the best-known releaser on the internet".

In a 2016 interview FitGirl stated that she was in her 20s to 30s and worked in computers. She stated that she was "female and kinda proud of it", as the only female repacker in the P2P scene at the time. She claims that she was born in Russia, but based in Latvia.

In October 2024, the US trade association Entertainment Software Association submitted a list of notorious markets to the US Trade Representative which listed FitGirl Repacks. The report stated that the website received 22 million visits in July 2024. The 2024 Review of Notorious Markets for Counterfeiting and Piracy published by the Office of the United States Trade Representative had the website listed, and stated that it failed to comply with takedown notices, and was the subject of blocking orders in Italy and Spain.
