= Symphony Live in Istanbul =

Live album by Kitaro
- Released: September 9, 2014
- Recorded: March 2014
- Venue: Halic Congress Center (Istanbul)
- Genre: New-age
- Length: 1:03:58
- Label: Domo Records, Inc
- Producer: Kitarō

Kitaro chronology
The Kitaro Quintessential (2013)	Symphony Live in Istanbul (2014)	Thinking of You (Remastered) (2014)

Symphony Live in Istanbul is an album by Japanese new-age recording artist Kitaro, released by Domo Records on September 9, 2014. The album was recorded live at the Halic Congress Center in Istanbul, Turkey over two evenings in March 2014.

Commenting on the event, Kitaro said, "This past spring, I embarked upon my first Symphonic Tour that reached Russia, Eastern and Central Europe and had the distinct pleasure of performing in Istanbul; a place where from ancient times to modern times, has flourished as an important hub of the Silk Road where Europe and Asia meet. I am extremely grateful that my dream of performing in Istanbul finally came true."

In December 2014, Kitaro was honored by The National Academy of Recording Arts & Sciences for his work on Symphony Live in Istanbul, recognized as Best New Age Album, becoming Kitaro's 16th career Grammy Award nomination.

== Track listing ==
All tracks are written by Kitaro.

Title
No.	Title	Composer	Length
1.	"Heaven & Earth"	Kitaro	13:52
2.	"Thinking of You"	Kitaro	5:52
3.	"Orochi"	Kitaro	6:50
4.	"Silk Road"	Kitaro	5:55
5.	"Kokoro (Part II)"	Kitaro	5:21
6.	"Mercury"	Kitaro	8:41
7.	"Reimei"	Kitaro	8:55
8.	"Matsuri"	Kitaro	10:32

== Awards ==
Year	Award	Result
2015	57th Grammy Best New Age Album	Nominated

== Personnel ==
- Kitaro – Producer, Composer, Arranger, Keyboards, Peace Bell, Cover Art Painting
- Stephen Small – Arranger, Conductor, Keyboards, Music Director
- Michael Wilson – Recording & Mixing, Production Manager
- Tim Gennert – Mastering
- Keiko Takahashi – Keyboards, Photography
- Jessica Hindin – Violin
- Dan Antunovich – Bass
- Jasper De Roos – Drums
- The Alexander Symphony Orchestra
- Philip Gerke – Stage Tech
- Elijah Topazio – Monitor Engineer
- Leslie Weinberg – Lighting Designer
- Andrew Gearhart – Keyboard Tech

Additional Personnel

- Eiichi Naito – Executive Producer, Management, Photography
- Dino Malito – Artists & Repertoire, Management
- Howard Sapper – Business & Legal
- Kio Griffith – Art Direction, Design
- Atsuko Mizuta – Marketing & Promotions
- Mai Okuno – Marketing & Promotions
