= Let Mother Earth Speak =

Studio album by Kitarō
- Released: September 11, 2012
- Genre: New-age, spoken word
- Length: 59:20
- Label: Domo Records, Inc
- Producer: Kitarō

Professional ratings
Review scores
Source	Rating
Amazon.com	4/5 stars

Let Mother Earth Speak is a collaboration album, by Japanese new age musician Kitaro and Native American activist Dennis Banks.

It was released on September 11, 2012. Let Mother Earth Speak is included in the article "Best Instrumental Album 2012" of New Age Music World.

== Track listing ==
No.	Title	Composer	Length
1.	"Thank You Great Spirit"	Kitaro	8:03
2.	"Song of Responsibilities"	Kitaro	9:13
3.	"The Missionary Song"	Kitaro	8:16
4.	"A Good Day To Die"	Kitaro	6:47
5.	"Don't Cry"	Kitaro	5:50
6.	"The End of the Day Song"	Kitaro	6:33
7.	"She Don't Love Me Anymore"	Kitaro	5:49
8.	"Longest Walk 2"	Kitaro	4:28
9.	"Peace"	Kitaro	4:21
