= Singapore long hair ban =

A ban on long hair once existed in Singapore. In the 1960s, a Singapore government policy forbidding any male to sport long hair went into effect. This was in response to the growing popularity of the hippie subculture worldwide; the government under the conservative People's Action Party deemed this subculture as a supposedly negative influence and "detrimental to the country's development". The consequences for defying the long hair ban varied from getting fined to having one's hair being forcefully cut short. Additionally, it was ordered by the government that long-haired males be given the lowest priority when it came to requests for help at government facilities.

Long-haired male foreigners entering the country were requested to leave. Among others, the Bee Gees, Kitarō, and Led Zeppelin all were forced to cancel their gigs in Singapore because they refused to accommodate the policy.

The ban caused repercussions for the country after its introduction, straining ties between Singapore and other countries. Prime Minister of Singapore Lee Kuan Yew even had to cancel a business trip owing to heavy protests by a few individuals affected by the ban. It was finally lifted in the 1990s. In 2013, local newspaper The Straits Times included the ban in its list of fifty objects identifiable to Singapore.

== Background ==
The hippie (also spelled as "hippy") subculture movement arose in the United States in the 1960s. Other countries were quick to pick up this youth movement. Among other traits, hippies were supposed to sport long hair. Hippies in the West were said to consume great amounts of illegal drugs.

== Ban ==
The Singapore government claimed that so-called hippies were negative influences for Singaporeans capable of "corrupting" their minds and "polluting" the country's society. Adopting an anti-hippy stance, the government introduced an official policy dissuading males from having long hair. (Note: The Ministry of Home Affairs construed "long hair" as "hair covering the ears", "hair reaching below an ordinary shirt collar", and/or "hair falling across the forehead and touching the eyebrows".) In the first few years after the policy's introduction, the consequences for not abiding by it were already intrusive: long-haired males spotted by the police were forced to cut it short. In addition, should they have been civil servants, they were at risk of losing their livelihoods or, if lucky, receive a strict warning for "flouting discipline". Lastly, any male with long hair was automatically given the lowest priority at government facilities. Posters outside these places proclaimed, "Males with long hair will be attended to last". (Note: see this article for an example)

In 1976, long-haired men in Singapore who worked for the government began being fined a sum of S$200. The other possible consequences also remained. The ban applied not only to locals, but also to visiting or working foreigners. It was officially lifted in the 1990s.

=== Incidents ===
In August 1970, Prime Minister of Singapore Lee Kuan Yew had to cancel his official business trip to Kuala Lumpur, Malaysia to handle the uproar caused by the apprehension of three long-haired youths from Malaysia, which many found to be controversial and unjustified. Lee organised a press conference, where he formally apologised to the affected parties.

Long-haired male tourists attempting to enter Singapore were made to visit the barber or leave the country. Those who took the latter option were barred from re-entering the country for months even if they already got their hair cut. In 1972, a few protesting Australian tourists reportedly urged the masses to boycott Singapore. The Australian High Commission took note of their dissatisfaction, and promptly made a formal inquiry into the incident, though admitting that it was not its prerogative to complain about it.

In 1974, 8,172 male government workers were called up for having long hair. Some eleven of them were fined, whilst four others left the government. Although the ban was only officially applied to men, a handful of female schoolchildren in Singapore were reported to have had their long hair forcefully cut short after being warned countless times. In justification, the school's principal, who was responsible for cutting their hair, claimed that she was following the law.

Japanese entertainer Kitarō was forced to cancel his 1984 gig in Singapore because of his long hair, which he refused to cut. Similarly, Cliff Richard, Led Zeppelin and the Bee Gees were all supposed to perform in Singapore at different points in time but left because of the ban.

=== Aftermath ===
The ban is frequently mentioned in books about Singapore, to exemplify the fact about it being strict in terms of discipline. In 1982, Australian rock band Little River Band released the song "Down On The Border", in which a reference to the ban on long hair is made in the lyrics "And I never will go to Singapore/The people there will cut your hair/In Singapore". The ban has been compared with Singapore's ban on chewing gum. In November 2013, The Straits Times listed it as one of the fifty items relating to Singapore's history.

== See also ==
- Chewing gum ban in Singapore
- Beard and haircut laws by country
