= Ancient (album) =

Studio album by Kitarō
- Released: May 08, 2001
- Genre: New-age
- Length: 55:47
- Label: Domo Records, Inc
- Producer: Kitarō

Kitarō chronology
Thinking Of You (1999)	Ancient (2001)	An Ancient Journey (2002)

Ancient is an album by Japanese new age artist Kitarō, which was released in 2001.

The album was nominated for 44th Grammy Awards New Age Best Album in 2002.

== Track listing ==
All tracks are written by Kitaro.

No.	Title	Length
1.	"Prologue"	0:35
2.	"Nile"	4:10
3.	"Ancient Of Wind"	2:01
4.	"Ritual Dance"	3:35
5.	"Water Of Mastery"	3:07
6.	"Tumba Dance"	4:39
7.	"Wave From Ancient"	2:56
8.	"Spirit Of Harp"	2:59
9.	"Great Pyramid"	3:53
10.	"Mysterious Triangle"	4:11
11.	"Itonami"	5:50
12.	"Unicorn"	3:46
13.	"Crystal Sand"	3:37
14.	"Dholavira"	5:04
15.	"Beyond"	5:35

== Charts and awards ==
Year	Chart	Position
2001	Top New Age Albums (Billboard)	10

Year	Award	Result
2002	44th Grammy Best New Age Album	Nominated

== Personnel ==
Kitaro - Keyboards

- Gary Barlough - Engineer
- Barry Goldberg - Mix
- Doug Sax - Mastering

Additional Personnel

- Eiichi Naito - Management
- Dino Malito - Management
- Kazu Kuni - Art Direction & Design
