= Hiromitsu Agatsuma =

Japanese shamisen artist

- Born: July 27, 1973 (age 52)
- Origin: Hitachi, Ibaraki, Japan
- Genres: Jazz fusion, Hogaku, jazz, Rock
- Instrument: Tsugaru-jamisen
- Years active: 2001–present
- Labels: Toshiba EMI, Domo Records
- Website: http://agatsuma.tv/

Hiromitsu Agatsuma (上妻 宏光 Agatsuma Hiromitsu, born July 27, 1973) is a Japanese shamisen artist who plays the Tsugaru-jamisen, a larger shamisen with thicker strings than those used for most other styles. He was born in Hitachi, Ibaraki Prefecture.

== Early life ==
Agatsuma began studying the Tsugaru-jamisen at the age of six, and earned his first accolade - top prize at the 1988 All-Japan Tsugaru-jamisen Competition - at 14. This was followed in 1995 and 1996, by top honours at the Tsugaru-jamisen National Competition, said to be the country's most prestigious.

Despite the high acclaim he received in the hogaku, or traditional Japanese music world, for his accomplishments, Agatsuma did not rest on his laurels. He not only continued to explore the traditional aspects of his instrument, but also avidly experimented in fusing its sounds with diverse musical genres.

== Career ==
In September 2001, he made his major label debut on Toshiba EMI with the eponymous Agatsuma. This album, comprising five traditional pieces and five original ones, was named Traditional Japanese Music Album of the Year at the 16th Japan Gold Disc Awards.

In BEAMS, his second album (released in July 2002), he recorded ten original works, taking the Tsugaru-jamisen in new directions. The same album was subsequently released in America by Domo Records in January 2003, upon which Agatsuma made his US debut. His five-concert tour of the east coast - New York, Boston, Windsor, and Baltimore - was a huge success.

In March 2003, Agatsuma released a traditional shamisen album, Classics (Agatsuma 3), which includes tracks recorded live in a New York church.

Currently he is broadening his field with over 100 annual concerts, sessions and media appearances both in Japan and overseas, while continuing to pursue "the traditions of and innovation in the Tsugaru-jamisen."

Media appearances include joint performances with artists from around the world; he was a guest at the Japan performances of Marcus Miller (Bass) and has performed with Larry Coryell (Guitar), Nana Vasconcelos (Percussion), Sarena Jones (Vocals) and others.

Agatsuma's song Tsuki Sayu Yoru was included by FitGirl Repacks as an installer tune for many pirated video games. The song gained significant popularity online, particularly among pirates. In 2020, the volume of YouTube comments on his music discussing FitGirl was enough to cause Google's algorithm to erroneously consider her a "musical artist", and link from her knowledge base panel back to Agatsuma.

== Discography ==
- 2001 – Agatsuma
- 2002 – Beams (Agatsuma 2)
- 2002 – New Asia
- 2002 – KoKoRo-Dozen Hearts
- 2003 – Classics (Agatsuma III)
- 2003 – New Asia II
- 2004 – Beyond
- 2005 – Eien no Uta - Eternal Songs
- 2006 – En
- 2007 – Soufuu
- 2008 – Agatsuma Plays Standards
- 2010 – The Best of
- 2010 – Jukki
- 2012 – Kusabi
- 2014 – Gen
- 2015 – Kusabi
- 2015 – New
- 2016 – Sui
- 2018 – NuTRAD
- 2020 – Tsugaru
- 2025 – TSUNAGU
