= Heaven & Earth (soundtrack) =

Film score by Kitarō
- Released: December 7, 1993
- Genres: instrumental, folk
- Length: 39:02
- Label: Domo Records, Inc
- Producer: Kitarō

Kitarō chronology
Live in America (1992)	Heaven & Earth (1993)	Mandala (1994)

Heaven & Earth is the official soundtrack to the 1993 Golden Globe-winning film of the same name directed by Oliver Stone, with the original score composed by Japanese composer Kitarō. The score won a Golden Globe Award for Best Original Score.

== Overview ==
In the score are featured exotic-sounding percussion, gongs and flutes contrasted with synthesizer and orchestral sounds. It also features Chinese huqin, Vietnamese folk tunes and chant-like vocal textures. It is additionally filled with rich orchestral timbres, and earth-shaking taiko drums.

== Track listing ==
All tracks are written by Kitaro.

No.	Title	Length
1.	"Heaven And Earth (Land Theme)"	7:38
2.	"Sau Dau Tree"	3:37
3.	"Ahn & Le Ly Love Theme"	4:55
4.	"Saigon Reunion"	5:48
5.	"ARVN"	3:41
6.	"Sau Nightmare"	0:58
7.	"V.C. Bonfire"	0:47
8.	"Trong Com"	0:43
9.	"Ahn's House: Entrance/ Please Come Visit My Village of Hoa Qui"	6:26
10.	"Destiny"	1:13
11.	"Last Phone Call"	1:40
12.	"A Child Without A Father"	2:04
13.	"Village Attack/ The Arrest"	1:21
14.	"Walk To The Village"	2:59
15.	"Steve's Ghosts"	1:31
16.	"Return To Vietnam"	2:04
17.	"Heaven And Earth (End Title)"	10:27
Total length:		57:52
