= Yukiko Haneda =

Japanese singer (born 1966)

Johanna Yukiko Haneda 羽根田 征子
- Born: January 11, 1966 (age 60); Tokyo, Japan
- Genres: J-pop, jazz
- Occupation: Singer
- Instrument: Vocals
- Years active: 1988–present
- Labels: Sony Music Japan, Domo
- Website: jo-h.me

Yukiko Haneda (羽根田 征子, Haneda Yukiko; born January 11, 1966 in Tokyo) is a Japanese singer.

== Biography ==
She graduated from the University of the Sacred Heart in Tokyo with a degree in philosophy.

Haneda made her debut as a recording artist with her album Beating Mess in 1988. Several of her songs have appeared on television commercials in Japan, with her initial single, "Encore," featured in the Fuji Television drama series Dakishimetai! (抱きしめたい!).

Since the late 1990s, Haneda has been noted for her cover versions of works by Western artists. Her albums since her 1997 release Good Times, Bad Times have encompassed genres including fado, tango, jazz, and American show tunes.

== Discography ==
=== Albums ===
Year	Title	Release date
1988	Beating Mess	March 21, 1988
1989	Sora	August 21, 1989
1997	Good Times, Bad Times; Reissued in 2005 on Domo Records	June 1997
2002	Love in the Hands	June 19, 2002
2005	Aire de Tango; Collaboration with Kiyoshi Shiga	March 2005
2008	fadista	June 2008
2010	Music Trip -Aranjuez- Collaboration with Trio The Trip	July 27, 2010
2012	Changes-	February 25, 2012

=== Singles ===
Year	Title	Release date
1988	"Encore"; Featured in the Fuji Television drama series Dakishimetai! (抱きしめたい!)	July 21, 1988
1991	"You Are My Home"; Main theme in the film Strawberry Road (ストロベリーロード)	April 26, 1991

=== Contributions to other works ===
Year	Title	Release date
2006	"Great Masters of Art"; On the TV Tokyo series The Great Masters of Art 2000–2006 (美の巨人たち Bi no kyoujin-tachi) soundtrack album	March 24, 2006
2006	"Mais Para La"; On the album Mais para la by Mikio Watanabe & Best Friends	September 11, 2006
2019	6 Underground	
