= Baal Records =

- Founded: 1970s
- Founder: Jay Shotam, Bal Shotam
- Distributor: Pye UK
- Genre: Rock, pop
- Country of origin: Singapore

Baal Records was a Singaporean record label that released recordings by artists such as Breath, Funkgus, Jade & Pepper, October Cherries Truck and others from Singapore. The label also handled the Singapore release of records by artists such as Van McCoy & the Soul City Symphony and The Stylistics.

== Background ==
Baal Records was a major distributor for recordings in the far East. Most of the artists signed to the label had their recordings made in Holland. According to an interview on Ear Candy, the label came about as a result of Jay Shotam being unable to get the recordings of his group The Surfers issued in Europe by EMI. So, they devised their own method.

Artists to have releases on the label include, Agnes Strange, Brutus, Funkgus, October Cherries, Star and Truck.

By the late 1970s, among the genres the label was pushing was disco music. The label had a list of 400 venues which it serviced.

It appears that a variant of the label, Baal was used for UK releases.

== History ==
Baal Records handled the Singapore manufacturing for The Stylistics' album Rockin' Roll Baby and the manufacturing and licensing for Van McCoy's 1975 album Disco baby.

According to the 5 March 1977 issue of Billboard, Baal Records had picked up the master recording for "Move Up Starsky" by The Mexicano for a national release.

It was reported by Music Week in the magazine's 17 September issue that Baal Records had set up their UK operation with Pye Records earlier that year. With some pop and disco acts already signed to them, they were planning to venture into new wave. Conjuring up unique promotion methods to get media attention, the label sent out whips with the J J Jameson release "Rock And Roll Slave". New recordings that the label was promoting in the UK was "Loving You Has Never Come Easy" by Australian act, First Lady and "Me to the Disco" by the AJL Band. They had also signed on Agnes Strange, a former RCA act. The singles they licensed from Canada's GRT label were "Ooh Mama Mama" by Brutus, "Star Born Every Minute" by Ralph Murphy and "Come to the Music" by Ishan People. At the time, Jay Shotam was handling the label's A&R activities, Warren Hoskins was handling promotion and Colin Brain was the MD.

It was noted by Music Week in the magazine's 29 April 1978 issue that Baal Records were seeking second options on major US and European product. At the time they had a London office located at 62 Gloucester Place, London Wl.

As producers, Jay Shotam and Balram Shotam worked with arranger Alan Hill on Christina Ong's 25th Of Last December album which was released on Baal BAL 89009 and Elektra/Asylum Records in 1979.

As of 1980, the directors were, Balram Shotam and Jay Shotam. The sales director was Jeffrey Collins.

It was reported in the 19 January 1980 issue of Music Week that director Balram Shotam and sales director Jeffrey Collins were at the Midem festival seeking a record deal.
