= Koichi Tamano =

Japanese Butoh dancer

Koichi Tamano (玉野黄市) is one of the masters of the Japanese dance form Butoh. He performed individually or with his wife Hiroko Tamano and their performance group Harupin-Ha. He has also performed with other artists including Kitaro. They introduced the dance form to the west coast of America.

== Early life and career ==
Tamano was born in 1946 near the Ooi River in Shimada, Shizuoka, Japan.

In 1964, when he was 18, he began his 10-year apprenticeship under Hijikata Tatsumi at Asbestos-kan, where he earned the nickname "bow-legged Nijinsky". His first butoh performance was in 1965 in Tokyo in a work of Tatsumi Barairo Dansu (Rose-Colored Dance). In 1968, he performed in "Tatsumi Hijikata and the Japanese-Nikutai no Hanran". Both he and his wife, Hiroko Tamano, performed with Tatsumi.

In 1970, Tamano was a part of the Hangi Daitokan performance series, lasting for 3 years. He was involved in performances such as "Gibasa", "Buy Love", and "Susamedama".

He founded Harupin-Ha in 1972 and performed in Tokyo. Harupin-Ha is a reference to Manchuria and has the meaning "a studying station from Asia to Europe, a place of journey of mixed culture" or "starting place of a journey". Their first performance was titled "Nagasu Kujira" or "Finback whale". He acted as artistic director for Harupin-Ha, choreographing works such as Swamp (1979), Fetus of Nature (1988), Piece on Earth (1989), Wings of a Century - Life (1990), Wings of a Century - Death (1991), and MANDALOVE (1992).

In the '70s, in addition to Hangi Daitokan and Harupin-Ha, Koichi performed in "Shiki no tame no Nijyuu Nana Ban" or "27 Nights for Four Seasons" and "Hosotan" or "Story of Smallpox". Both of these pieces would later be revived during the Tamano's time in San Francisco.

== Career in America ==
Tamano first visited United States in 1976 to perform at the "Japan Now" SFMOMA exhibition. With this visit, he also had the goal of seeking out his grandfather who had moved to the United States in 1907. In 1978, Koichi Tamano relocated to Berkeley, California with Hiroko Tamano, in search of a place to raise his child. In the beginning of 1986, Tatsumi Hijikata passed away. In the same year, Koichi Tamano obtained his green card in the United States.

In 1993, Koichi appeared as a guest performer in several state-side performances. Among them included "Goten, Sora o Tobu" with Kazuo Ono Buto and "UGETSU" with Akaji Maro and DaiRakuda Kan.

Koichi and Hiroko Tamano were based in San Francisco where they ran a restaurant, first in Country Station in the Mission, then in Noe Valley. They taught Butoh in California and continued to perform around the world.

The Tamanos were honored with an Izzie Sustained Achievement Award in 2005.

== Artistic collaborations ==
After Tatsumi Hijikata's death in 1986, Tamano spent the next years in Japan, performing in memorial of Hijikata. These performances included an appearance at the 1986 "Hijikata Tatsumi Photo Exhibition", "Rashomon" in 1987 in Kyoto with Akaji Maro and DaiRakuda Kan, and "Romanov's Sea" in 1987 in Tokyo with Akiko Motofuji and M. Ishii.

In 2000, the couple performed in the world tour of Kitaro.
