= Daylight, Moonlight: Kitaro Live in Yakushiji =

Daylight, Moonlight: Kitaro Live In Yakushiji

Live album by Kitarō
- Released: 2002
- Genre: New age
- Length: 112:55
- Label: Domo Records
- Producer: Kitarō

Professional ratings
Review scores
Source	Rating
Allmusic	3/5 stars

Daylight, Moonlight: Live In Yakushiji is a 2 disc live album by Kitaro. It was recorded over three evenings at the Yakushi-ji temple in the ancient Japanese capital of Nara.

== Track listing ==
Disk 1

All tracks are written by Kitaro.

Title
No.	Title	Composer	Length
1.	"Monk's Introduction"	Kitaro	5:05
2.	"Hazimari/Sozo"	Kitaro	9:52
3.	"Carvansary"	Kitaro	5:57
4.	"Silk Road"	Kitaro	7:51
5.	"Magma"	Kitaro	10:23
6.	"Mercury"	Kitaro	13:06

Disk 2

All tracks are written by Kitaro.

Title
No.	Title	Composer	Length
1.	"Water Of Mystery"	Kitaro	9:37
2.	"Estrella"	Kitaro	7:44
3.	"Koi"	Kitaro	10:29
4.	"Wa"	Kitaro	11:06
5.	"Free Flight"	Kitaro	9:26
6.	"Heaven And Earth"	Kitaro	12:19

== Personnel ==
- Kitaro : Keyboards
- Keiko Takahashi : Keyboards
- Shinji Ebihara : Keyboards
- Yayoi Sakiyama : Violin
- Tomoko Nomura : Percussion
- Gary Barlough - Engineer
- Dave Collins - Mastering Engineer

Additional Personnel

- Eiichi Naito : Executive Producer, Management
- Dino Malito : Artists & Repertoire, Management
