= The Light of the Spirit =

Studio album by Kitarō
- Released: 1987 (Released in 1997)
- Genre: New-age
- Length: 48:45
- Label: Domo Records
- Producers: Kitaro, Mickey Hart

Kitarō chronology
Tenku (1986)	The Light of the Spirit (1987)	Kojiki (1990)

Professional ratings
Review scores
Source	Rating
Allmusic	5/5 stars

The Light of the Spirit is a Kitarō studio album co-produced by the Grateful Dead drummer, Mickey Hart. The album received a Grammy nomination for the single "The Field".

== Reception ==
CD Review called the album "[...] a lush wash of synthesizer orchestrations with acoustic colors."

== Track listing ==
All music is composed by Kitarō.

No.	Title	Length
1.	"Mysterious Encounter"	6:04
2.	"Sundance"	6:18
3.	"The Field"	4:55
4.	"The Light of the Spirit"	7:29
5.	"In the Beginning"	5:54
6.	"Moondance"	4:44
7.	"Howling Thunder"	6:09
8.	"Journey to a Fantasy"	7:12

== Personnel ==
Musicians

- Kitaro - arranger
- Hiroshi Araki - guitar
- Bobby Black - pedal steel guitar, guitar
- David Grisman - mandolin
- Mickey Hart - percussion, special effects
- Tomoyuki Hayashi - keyboards
- Zakir Hussain - percussion
- David Jenkins - guitar
- Jose Lorenzo - percussion
- John Meyer - flute
- Lynn Ray - vocals
- Jeff Sterling - synthesizer
- Jeanie Tracy - vocals
- Norihiro Tsuru - violin
- Bobby Vega - bass guitar

Credits

- Producer - Kitaro, Mickey Hart
- Mixing - Kitaro
- Engineer - Tom Flye
- Programming, operation - Jeff Sterling
- Assistant engineer - Tom Size
- Assistant producer - Ruriko Sakumi
- Design - Laura LiPuma
- Photography - Yukio Ohyam, Ryuzo Toyotaka
