= Dream (Kitarō album) =

Studio album by Kitarō, Jon Anderson
- Released: 1 February 1992 (Japan); 1 January 1997 (re-release)
- Genre: New-age
- Length: 56:31
- Label: Geffen Records; Domo Records

Kitarō, Jon Anderson chronology
Kojiki (1990)	Dream (1992)	Mandala (1994)

Professional ratings
Review scores
Source	Rating
Allmusic	4/5 stars

Dream is an album by the Japanese new age musician Kitarō, featuring vocals by Jon Anderson, singer of the band Yes on three songs.

== Track listing ==
All lyrics are written by Jon Anderson (Tracks 3, 6 and 10); all music is composed by Kitarō.

No.	Title	Length
1.	"Symphony of the Forest"	4:43
2.	"Mysterious Island"	3:40
3.	"Lady of Dreams (ft. Jon Anderson)"	8:17
4.	"A Drop of Silence"	2:56
5.	"A Passage of Life"	8:00
6.	"Agreement (ft. Jon Anderson)"	6:31
7.	"Dream of Chant"	3:53
8.	"Magical Wave"	3:06
9.	"Symphony of Dreams"	5:44
10.	"Island of Life (ft. Jon Anderson)"	9:41

== Charts ==
Year	Chart	Position
1992	Top New Age Albums (Billboard)	3
