= October Cherries =

Singaporean rock band

- Origin: Singapore
- Genres: Rock, pop
- Years active: 1968-1974
- Labels: Baal Records, Baal, Best of Everything, Columbia, Elastic, Hit, P.S. Records, Pink Elephant, Stateside
- Spinoffs: Truck
- Spinoff of: The Surfers
- Past members: Peter Diaz; Sunny Ismail; Richard Khan; Jay Shotam; Benny Siow

The October Cherries were a rock group from Singapore that was founded in 1968. They recorded a number of singles and albums They also had a chart hit in Australia.

== Background ==
The group was influenced by The Beatles and were popular in Malaysia and the Netherlands.

=== The Surfers ===
The group was originally known as the Surfers. They were signed to the EMI label.

The Surfers released the Hooray for Hazel EP on Columbia ECHK-602 in 1968. It included the songs, "Hooray for Hazel", "Mony Mony", "Answer Me" and "Honey (I Miss You)". The group also backed Asha Puthli on an EP recording which was released that year. The songs were "Angel of the Morning", "The Sounds of Silence", "Sunny" and "Fever".

Due to being unable to have their recordings released in Europe, stemming from the unwillingness of EMI, the group changed their name to The October Cherries in 1968. As they were signed on as The Surfers, changing their name to October Cherries via a legal hole in their contract enabled the action. This also led to the formation of Baal Records.

=== October Cherries ===
The October Cherries recorded songs with strong psychedelic backgrounds, which included "Lay Down Your Love", "Dreamseller" and "Felicia".

Like many of the Baal label artists, they recorded in Holland.

== Career ==
In 1968 / 1969, the group debuted with their Meet the October Cherries album that was released on Baal Records BCO 100.

It was reported by Billboard in the magazine's 2 December 1972 issue that the October Cherries had been in Holland to promote their single "All Things Work Together" which was released by Dureco on the Pink Elephant label. The single would bring them some overseas chart success. It peaked at number 96 in Australia in January 1972.

The band broke up around the early to mid-seventies after performing in New Delhi as a result of Peter Diaz accepting an offer to join Belgian band Pepples.

In 1975, their World Hits 1975 was released. It included the songs "Kung Fu Fighting", "Honey Honey", "Rock Your Baby", "Rock The Boat", "Rock Me Gently" and "Billy, Don't Be a Hero" etc. It was also released in Australia on the EMS Records label, cat no. EMS 3026.

In 1980, a single, "The Buck Stops Here" bw "Breezy" was released on Baal BDN 38054. It was reviewed in the July 1980 issue of Zigzag and given a B−. The reviewer said that the beginning of "Jet Airliner" by Steve Miller and that it then rocks along into a tailor made for the charts poppy song. But the reviewer said that the vocalist sounded like "the dreaded Gilbert O'Sullivan".

== Later years ==
A short film by Christie Rodrigues, October Cherries was completed in 2015. It captured the band members then aged in their sixties. The film asks the question, the band with their history would they reunite again. Christie Rodrigues aka Cristy Amanda Rodrigues is the daughter of one of the band members.

Peter Diaz, was scheduled to appear at the "Blast from the Past" show, an event celebrating Singapore music at the Esplanade Concert Hall, on 3 March 2022.
