= Kojiki (album) =

Studio album by Kitarō
- Released: 1990
- Genre: New age
- Length: 46:16
- Labels: Original: Geffen, Remastered: Domo Records, Inc
- Producer: Kitarō

Kitarō chronology
The Light of the Spirit (1987)	Kojiki (1990)	Dream (1992)

Professional ratings
Review scores
Source	Rating
AllMusic	3/5 stars

Kojiki (Japanese: 古事記/こじき) is an album by the new age artist Kitarō, which was nominated for a Grammy award in 1990. It is based on the Kojiki, a classic book of ancient Japanese history and legends.

This album features the string section from the Skywalker Symphony, along with Kitaro's signature keyboard and flute sounds. It was released in 1990.

The flute music and prelude in the song "Duniya Haseenon ka mela" from the Bollywood movie Gupt (released in 1997) has been partially influenced from the song Matsuri (among other songs by Kitaro), by the composer Viju Shah.

== Track listing ==
All tracks are written by Kitaro.

No.	Title	Length
1.	"Hajimari"	5:34
2.	"Sozo"	3:35
3.	"Koi"	6:29
4.	"Orochi"	7:10
5.	"Nageki"	5:44
6.	"Matsuri"	8:59
7.	"Reimei"	8:36

== Charts ==
Chart (1990)	Peak position
The Billboard 200	159
Top New Age Albums (Billboard)	1
