= Final Call (album) =

Studio album by Kitaro
- Released: September 10, 2013
- Genre: New-age
- Length: 61:51
- Label: Domo Records, Inc
- Producer: Kitarō

Kitaro chronology
Tamayura (2013)	Final Call (2013)	The Kitaro Quintessential (2013)

Final Call is an album by Japanese New Age recording artist Kitaro, released by Domo Records on September 10, 2013. The album is a tribute to Kitaro's lifelong reverence of Nature, and a musical call to action to encourage everyone to take better care of how we treat our planet.

Commenting on Final Call, Kitaro said, "I have always felt we all must respect the providence of the Universe. Unfortunately, through the course of time and the growth of civilization, many living creatures that we now know will become extinct. If we don't alter how we treat each other and our planet Earth, many habitats and portions of this earth may become devastated and eventually disappear."

In December 2013, Final Call was nominated by The National Academy of Recording Arts & Sciences for Best New Age Album, becoming Kitaro's 15th Grammy Award nomination.

== Track listing ==
All tracks are written by Kitaro

Title
No.	Title	Composer	Length
1.	"Final Call"	Kitaro	6:17
2.	"Jupiter's Beam"	Kitaro	6:07
3.	"Yo-En"	Kitaro	9:46
4.	"Shadow Of The Moon"	Kitaro	4:45
5.	"Traveler"	Kitaro	5:58
6.	"Valley Of The Spirit"	Kitaro	4:10
7.	"After Glow"	Kitaro	4:50
8.	"Wind From The Desert"	Kitaro	5:33
9.	"Moment Circle"	Kitaro	4:27
10.	"Whispering Shore"	Kitaro	5:09
11.	"Solar Eclipse"	Kitaro	4:50

== Awards ==
Year	Award	Result
2014	56th Grammy Best New Age Album	Nominated

== Personnel ==
- Kitaro - Producer, Composer, Arranger, Engineer, Keyboards, Percussion
- Timothy Beach - Engineer
- Tim Gennert - Mastering

Additional personnel

- Eiichi Naito - Executive Producer, Management
- Dino Malito - Artists & Repertoire, Management
- Kio Griffith - Art Direction, Design
- Atsuko Mizuta - Marketing & Promotions
- Mai Okuno - Marketing & Promotions
- Craig Melone - Liner Notes
