= An Enchanted Evening =

Live album by Kitarō
- Released: June 29, 1995
- Genre: New-age
- Length: 67:07
- Label: Domo Records, Inc
- Producer: Kitarō

An Enchanted Evening is a live album by Kitarō, released on June 29, 1995, recorded during his world tour that year. It features music from his studio album, Mandala, and his original score to Oliver Stone's 1993 film, Heaven and Earth.

A DVD was also released by Domo records, through Pioneer Artists (pa). With a different order and 7 tracks. "Silk road" is absent.

== Track listing ==
Title
No.	Title	Composer	Length
1.	"Mandala"	Kitaro	7:55
2.	"Planet"	Kitaro	1:59
3.	"Dance Of Sarasvati"	Kitaro	9:06
4.	"Silk Road"	Kitaro	7:59
5.	"Chant From The Heart"	Kitaro	8:59
6.	"Jawa Taiko"	Kitaro	7:05
7.	"Kokoro"	Kitaro	13:50
8.	"Heaven & Earth"	Kitaro	12:14

== Personnel ==
- Kitaro : Producer, Keyboards, Taiko Drums, Guitar, Wooden Flute, Tibetan Long Horn, Chanting
- Angus Clark : Guitar
- Diana Dentino : Keyboards
- Keith Heffner : Keyboards
- Nawang Khechog : Flutes/Percussion/Chanting
- Jeff McElroy : Bass
- Lorenza Ponce : Violin
- Yoshi Shimada : Drums
- Derek Zimmerman : Percussion
- Gary Barlough : Co-Producer
- Peter Kelsey : Engineer
- Erick Labson : Mastering Engineer
- Art Slave : Design
- Hideo Oida : Photography
- Kazu Yanagi : Photography
- Tour Manager: Matt Leach
- Production Manager : John Warren
- Guitars & Strings Tech : Ross Lahey
- Key Tech : Gary Barlough
- Eiichi Naito : Management
- Dino Malito : Management
- Frank V. Farrell : Touring Monitor Engineer

== Charts ==
Chart (1995)	Peak position
The Billboard 200	199
Billboard Top New Age Albums	4
Billboard Heatseekers Albums	16
