= Thinking of You (Kitarō album) =

Thinking Of You

Studio album by Kitarō
- Released: November 06, 1999
- Genre: New-age
- Length: 54:24
- Label: Domo Records, Inc
- Producer: Kitarō

Kitarō chronology
Best Of Kitaro Vol. 2 (1999)	Thinking Of You (1999)	The Soong Sisters (2000)

Professional ratings
Review scores
Source	Rating
Allmusic	4/5 stars

Thinking Of You is an album by Kitarō which won at the 43rd Grammy Awards for Best New Age Album.

== Track listing ==
All tracks are written by Kitarō

No.	Title	Length
1.	"Estrella"	4:20
2.	"Mercury"	5:57
3.	"Cosmic Wave"	3:40
4.	"Harmony of the Forest"	6:22
5.	"Fiesta"	7:46
6.	"Thinking of You"	6:53
7.	"Spirit of Water"	4:44
8.	"Stream"	5:33
9.	"Space II"	6:58
10.	"Del Mar"	2:11

== Charts ==
Year	Chart	Position
1999	Top New Age Albums (Billboard Magazine)	23

== Awards ==
Year	Award	Result
2000	Best New Age Albums (The Recording Academy)	Won
