= Amalia Rubin =

American singer known for Tibetan language songs

Amalia Rubin is an American singer of Jewish heritage who performs songs and music in the Tibetan language.

== Education ==
She was raised in a Reform Jewish home of Ashkenazi Polish-Russian Jews, in an English speaking family in upstate New York. Rubin pursued Asian Studies at the University at Buffalo and International Studies at the University of Washington. Through her education and career, she traveled to Tibet and Mongolia.

== Career ==
Rubin has released two albums, Mountains and Deserts and Leaving Home, both featuring traditional Tibetan songs. She has performed in over 30 concerts.

In 2007, she received the Best International Artist award for Tibet in Dharamsala, India.
