= John Kaizan Neptune =

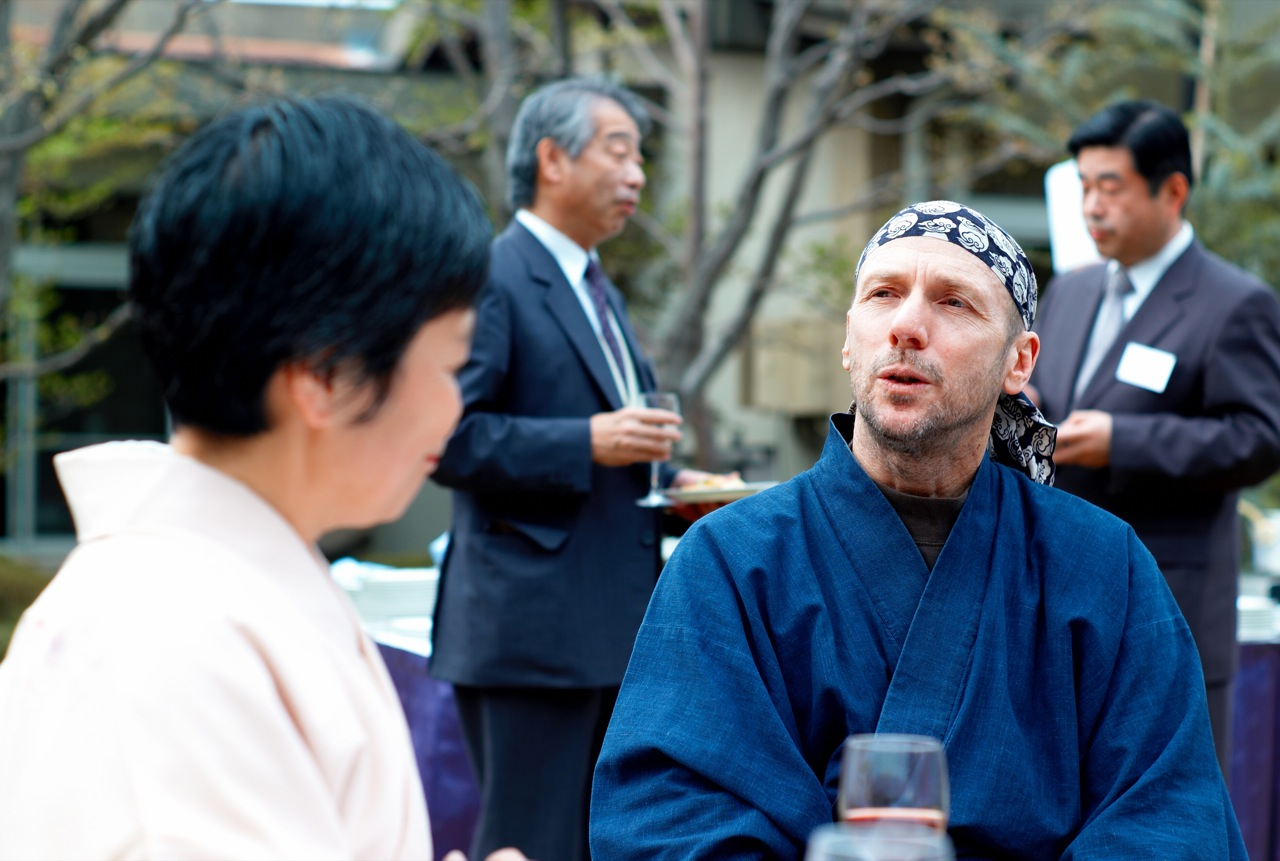

Background information
- Born: November 13, 1951 (age 73)
- Origin: Oakland, California, United States
- Genres: Jazz, jazz fusion, new-age, world
- Occupation: Musician
- Instrument: shakuhachi

John Kaizan Neptune (born November 13, 1951, in Oakland, California, United States) is an American player and builder of the shakuhachi (Japanese bamboo flute). He is known particularly for his use of the instrument in non-traditional contexts, such as jazz and cross-cultural music.

Neptune studied ethnomusicology at the University of Hawaii, where he began to study the shakuhachi with a Japanese Buddhist priest in 1971. In 1973, he continued his shakuhachi studies in Kyoto, Japan, returning after one year to Honolulu to complete a degree in ethnomusicology. Following his graduation, he traveled again to Kyoto for several more years of intensive study, and in March 1977 he received the "shi-han," or master's certificate, in the Tozan School of Shakuhachi. At that time he was awarded the honorary name "Kaizan," which means Sea Mountain. He lives in Japan.

Neptune has performed in North America, Europe, Australia, and Asia and recorded more than 20 albums with a variety of musicians. As a non-Japanese playing a Japanese traditional instrument, Neptune has attracted much interest from the Japanese public. His third recording, entitled Bamboo, was named Outstanding Album of the Year for 1980 by the Cultural Affairs Agency of the Japanese Ministry of Education, the first time a jazz recording or foreign artist had been so honored.

He also makes shakuhachi and other bamboo instruments at his home workshop in the Japanese countryside.

John Kaizan Neptune has recorded 21 records since 1979.
