= Impressions of the West Lake =

Studio album by Kitarō
- Released: April 28, 2009
- Genre: New-age
- Length: 1:14:44
- Label: Domo Records, Inc
- Producer: Kitarō

Impressions of the West Lake is an album by Japanese new age musician Kitarō, released in April 2009. It was nominated for Best New Age Album at the 52nd Annual Grammy Awards.

== Track listing ==
All tracks are written by Kitaro

Title
No.	Title	Composer	Length
1.	"The Inmost Feeling Ripples"	Kitaro	5:53
2.	"Aria di West Lake"	Kitaro	12:52
3.	"Fish Dive in the Lake"	Kitaro	7:29
4.	"The Moon on the Lake"	Kitaro	5:33
5.	"Impressions of the West Lake"	Kitaro	5:15
6.	"Zen"	Kitaro	5:05
7.	"Lotus"	Kitaro	7:25
8.	"Reflection of the Moon"	Kitaro	11:57
9.	"Romance"	Kitaro	7:06
10.	"Spirit of the West Lake"	Kitaro	6:09

== Awards ==
Year	Award	Result
2010	52nd Grammy Best New Age Album	Nominated

== Personnel ==
- Kitaro - Producer, Composer, Arranger, Engineer, Mixing
- Randy Miller - Arranger
- Ian Ulibarri - Assistant Engineer
- Steven Miller - Mixing
- Doug Sax - Mastering
- Jane Zhang - Vocals on the track, “Impressions Of The West Lake”

Additional Personnel

- Eiichi Naito - Executive Producer, Management
- Dino Malito - A&R, Management
- Howard Sapper - Business & Legal Affairs
- Joseph DeMeo - Marketing
- Hitoshi Saito - Marketing
- Atsuko Mizuta - Marketing
- Kio Griffith - Art Direction, Design
