= Mandala (Kitarō album) =

Studio album by Kitarō
- Released: August 24, 1994
- Genre: New-age
- Length: 51:35
- Label: Domo Records
- Producer: Kitarō

Kitarō chronology
Dream (1992)	Mandala (1994)	Peace on Earth (1996)

Professional ratings
Review scores
Source	Rating
Allmusic	3/5 stars

Mandala is an album by Kitarō, released in 1994. This is his first studio album for Domo Records. It was nominated for a Grammy Award in 1994 for Best New Age Album.

== Track listing ==
All tracks are written by Kitarō.

No.	Title	Length
1.	"Mandala"	6:09
2.	"Planet"	2:34
3.	"Dance of Sarasvati"	6:46
4.	"Scope"	4:51
5.	"Chant from the Heart"	8:10
6.	"Crystal Tears"	3:07
7.	"Winds of Youth"	7:27
8.	"Kokoro"	12:32

== Charts ==
Chart (1994)	Peak position
Top New Age Albums (Billboard)	3
