= Kitarō =

Japanese musician and composer

Kitaro 喜多郎
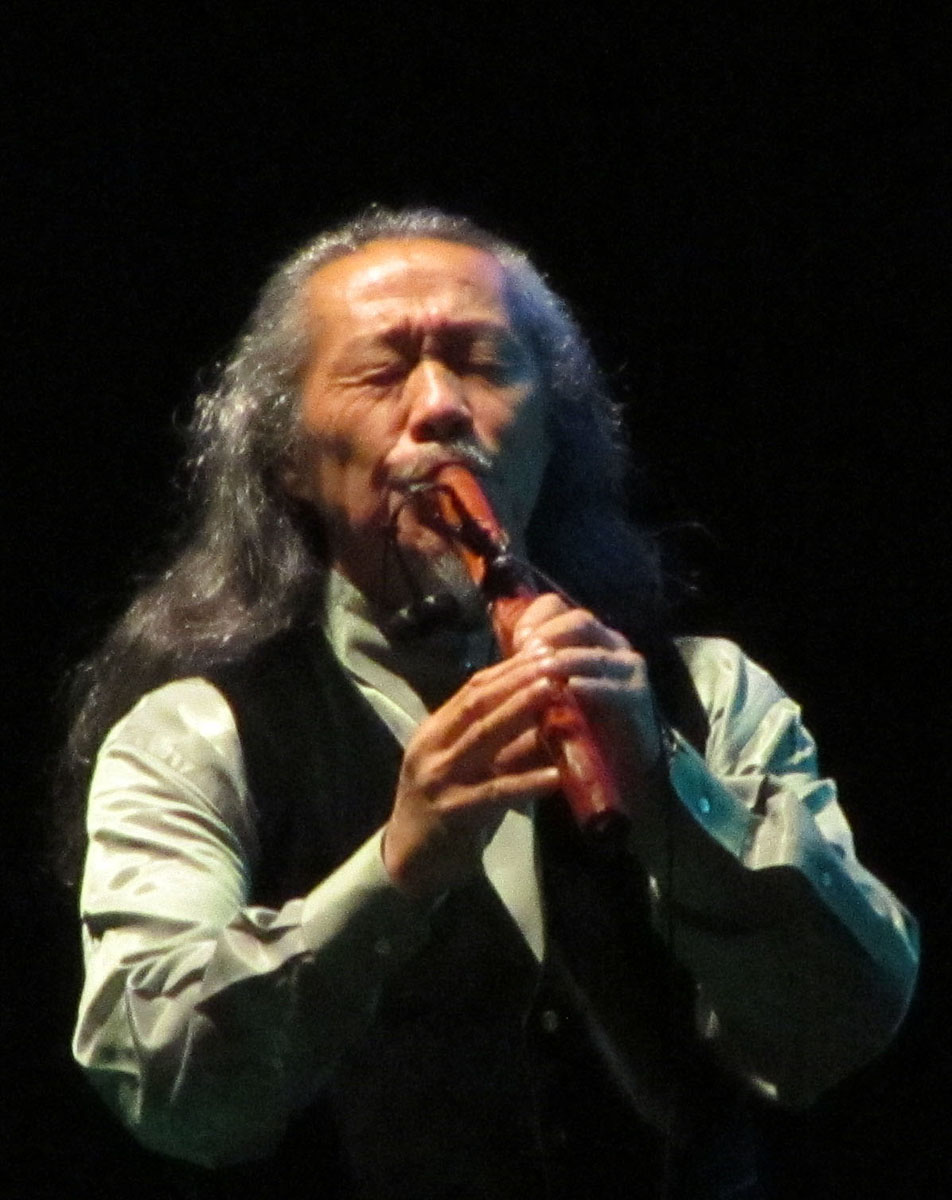
- Kitarō playing in Tehran, October 2014

Background information
- Born: Masanori Takahashi; February 4, 1953 (age 73); Toyohashi, Aichi, Japan
- Genres: Electronica, world, folk, classical, new-age
- Occupations: Musician, composer, record producer, arranger
- Instruments: Keyboards, guitar, bass guitar, Japanese flutes, drums, percussion
- Years active: 1975–present
- Labels: Geffen/Warner Bros. Records (US); Geffen/MCA Records (US); Domo Records; Nippon Columbia; Vertigo Records

Masanori Takahashi (高橋 正則, Takahashi Masanori; born February 4, 1953), professionally known as Kitarō (喜多郎), is a Japanese musician, composer, record producer, and arranger noted for his electronic-instrumental music, and is often associated with and regarded as one of the most prominent musical acts of new-age music. He won the Grammy Award for Best New Age Album for Thinking of You (1999), with a record 16 nominations in the same category. He received a Golden Globe Award for the original score to Heaven & Earth (1993).

== Early life: 1954–76 ==
Masanori Takahashi was born in Toyohashi, Aichi, Japan, and is a graduate of Toyohashi Commercial High School. Kitarō, which is his boyhood name meaning "man of love and joy", a practicing Buddhist himself, was born in a family of Shinto-Buddhist farmers. After graduating his parents were first opposed to the idea of their son having a musical career. In an effort to maneuver him towards their vision, they made arrangements for him to take a job at a local company. In response, he silently did not show up for the job, eventually convincing them that he should work on something he loved.

In high school Kitaro played electric guitar in a band that played American rhythm and blues of Otis Redding and covers by The Beatles. After graduating, and learning to play drums and bass, Kitaro moved to Tokyo to experience and become a part of the music scene, and it was there that he discovered the synthesizer. His first synthesizer was analog, and he recalls having "just loved the analog sound that it made compared to today's digital sound".

In the early 1970s, he changed completely to keyboard and joined the Japanese progressive rock band Far East Family Band and recorded four albums with them. While in Japan and Europe in 1975, he met the German electronica and former Tangerine Dream member Klaus Schulze. Schulze produced two albums for the band and gave Kitaro some tips for controlling synthesizers. In 1976, Kitaro left Far East Family Band and travelled through Asia (China, Laos, Thailand, India).

== Solo career: 1977–1993 ==
Back in Japan, Kitaro started his solo career in 1977. The first two albums Ten Kai and Daichi were released in 1978 and 1979. He performed his first symphonic concert at the "Small Hall" of the Kosei Nenkin Kaikan in Shinjuku, Tokyo.

=== Silk Road ===
The Silk Road: The Rise And Fall Of Civilizations is an NHK Tokushu documentary series that first aired on 7 April 1980, with sequels being broadcast over a 10-year period. It took a total of 17 years from conception to complete what many consider a landmark in Japan's broadcasting television history. The intention of the program was to reveal how ancient Japan was influenced by the Silk Road trade route. The documentary was narrated by Ishizaka Koji with music composed by Kitaro, who insisted that the show be broadcast in stereo. The music was composed mainly using a Minimoog, miniKORG 700, and Maxikorg DV800. The score received a Galaxy Award, and the series of soundtracks sold millions of copies. The success created from the program brought Kitaro international attention.

=== 1984–1993 ===
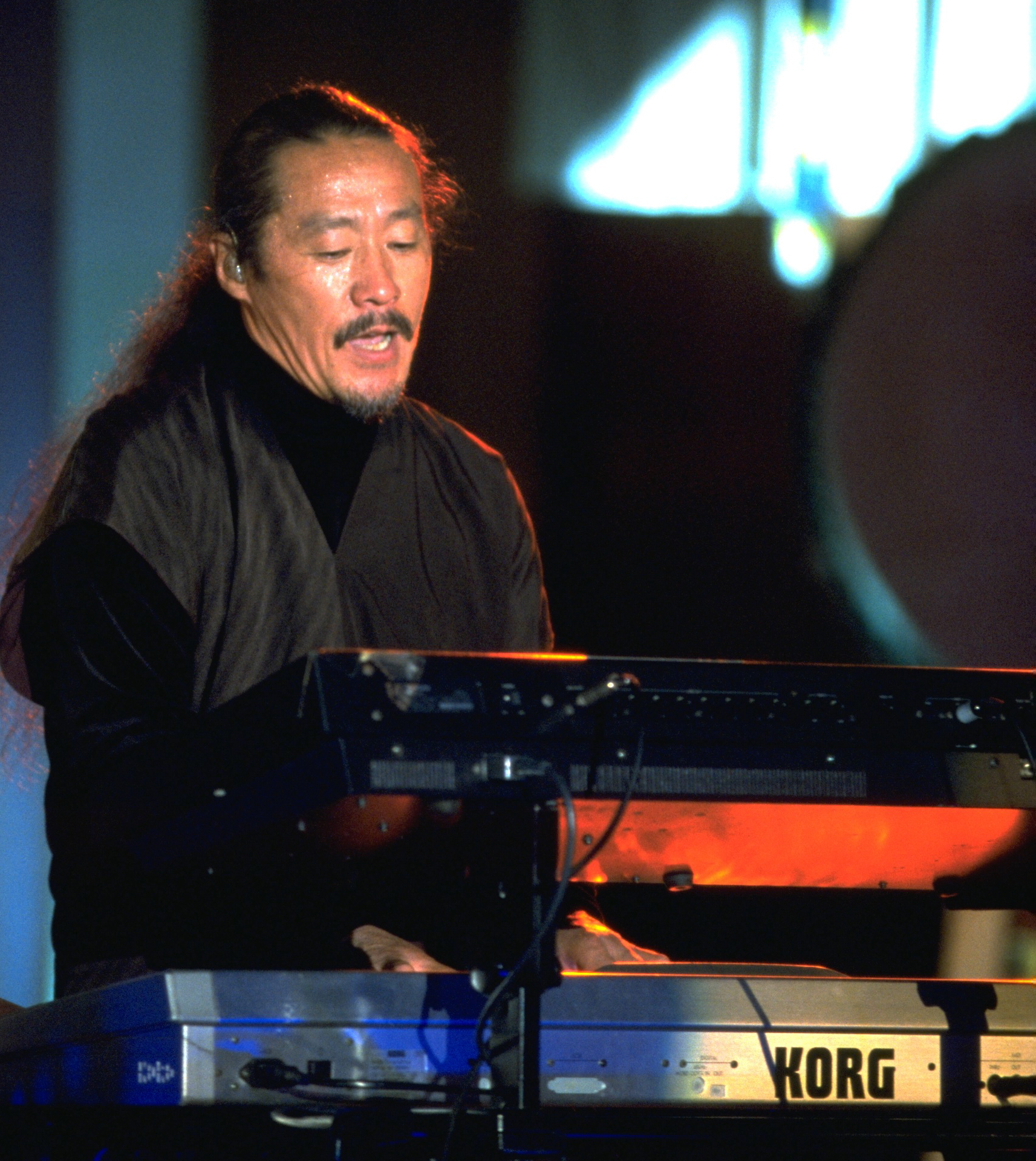
Kitaro playing live in the early 1990s

In 1984, Kitaro embarked on a "Live in Asia" tour. Notably, he was forced to cancel a leg in Singapore because he had long hair and at that time the country had a policy banning it.

He entered into a worldwide distribution arrangement with Geffen Records in 1985–1986. This included a re-releasing of six prior albums entitled Ten Kai (aka Astral Voyage), Daichi (aka Full Moon Story), Millennia, India, Silver Cloud and Live in Asia (aka Asia) (each packaged with Japanesque obi strips) as well as a new album, aptly titled Toward the West. Due to his combination of electronic and acoustic sounds, mellow music, and repeating chords which resembled the umbrella New age music category in the United States and Europe, his music was labeled as "new age". While he is not comfortable with the term, it doesn't mean much to him: "Whether people say my music is new age or not, it's OK with me. I'm just going to keep calling it Kitaro's music". On his music he noted that his outlook on life, study of philosophy, and responsibility to create music which has a good influence on society, influence his musical creation.

In 1987, he collaborated with Mickey Hart of the Grateful Dead for the album The Light of the Spirit (which sold two million copies) and in 1992 with Jon Anderson (Yes) for the album Dream. In 1988, his record sales soared to 10 million worldwide following a successful US tour. He was nominated three times for Grammy Award for Best New Age Album during his tenure at Geffen Records. In 1990 the studio album Kojiki was released, inspired by the Japanese 8th century chronicle Kojiki; the album reached #159 on Billboard 200, and #1 on Billboard New Age chart. His soundtrack for the movie Heaven & Earth (1993) won the Golden Globe Award for Best Original Score. Kitaro also produced an album Scenes (1992) released by Shrapnel Records with former Megadeth guitarist Marty Friedman.

== 1994–present ==
=== Domo Records ===
Since his 1994 debut for Domo Records, and the Grammy-nominated Mandala, Kitaro has released 24 studio albums. Among them, the live An Enchanted Evening (1995), Gaia-Onbashira (1998), and Ancient (2001) were all Grammy nominated. In 1999, Thinking of You won the Grammy for Best New Age Album. Kitaro and Randy Miller's soundtrack album The Soong Sisters (2000) received Best Original Music Award from the Hong Kong Film Award (1998), as well as the Taiwan Golden Horse Film Festival and Award (1997).

=== Sacred Journey of Ku-Kai series ===
Kitaro's music has long been recognized for its messages of peace and spirituality. In the wake of 9/11 the artist began to record the conceptual endeavor, which he envisioned as an artistic means to help unify people globally, Sacred Journey of Ku-Kai (2003). This was a series of peace-themed albums inspired by the Shikoku Henro Pilgrimage - the travel of Kūkai more than 1100 years ago. The four volumes in the album series were released in 2003, 2005, 2007, and 2011, respectively. Every track on the 4 volumes of Sacred Journey Of Ku-Kai contains samples from ancient Japanese temple bells (Peace Bells) from 88 sacred temples on the island of Shikoku, Japan.

=== Impressions of the West Lake ===
In 2007, Kitaro composed the music for Impression West Lake, a large-scale opera, directed by the renowned Chinese film director Zhang Yimou. The opera reflects Hangzhou city's history and culture through music and dance. Using modern technology, the stage is 75 centimeters below the lake's surface during the day so as not to affect the landscape and boating activities. In the evening, the stage is a few centimeters below the lake's surface so actors can walk and perform freely over a surprising water mirror that compose with the lights and colors. The one-hour event had its opening night in March 2007. In 2009, Domo Records released the original soundtrack album Impressions of the West Lake which was nominated for the Grammy in Best New Age Album category.

=== Recent projects ===
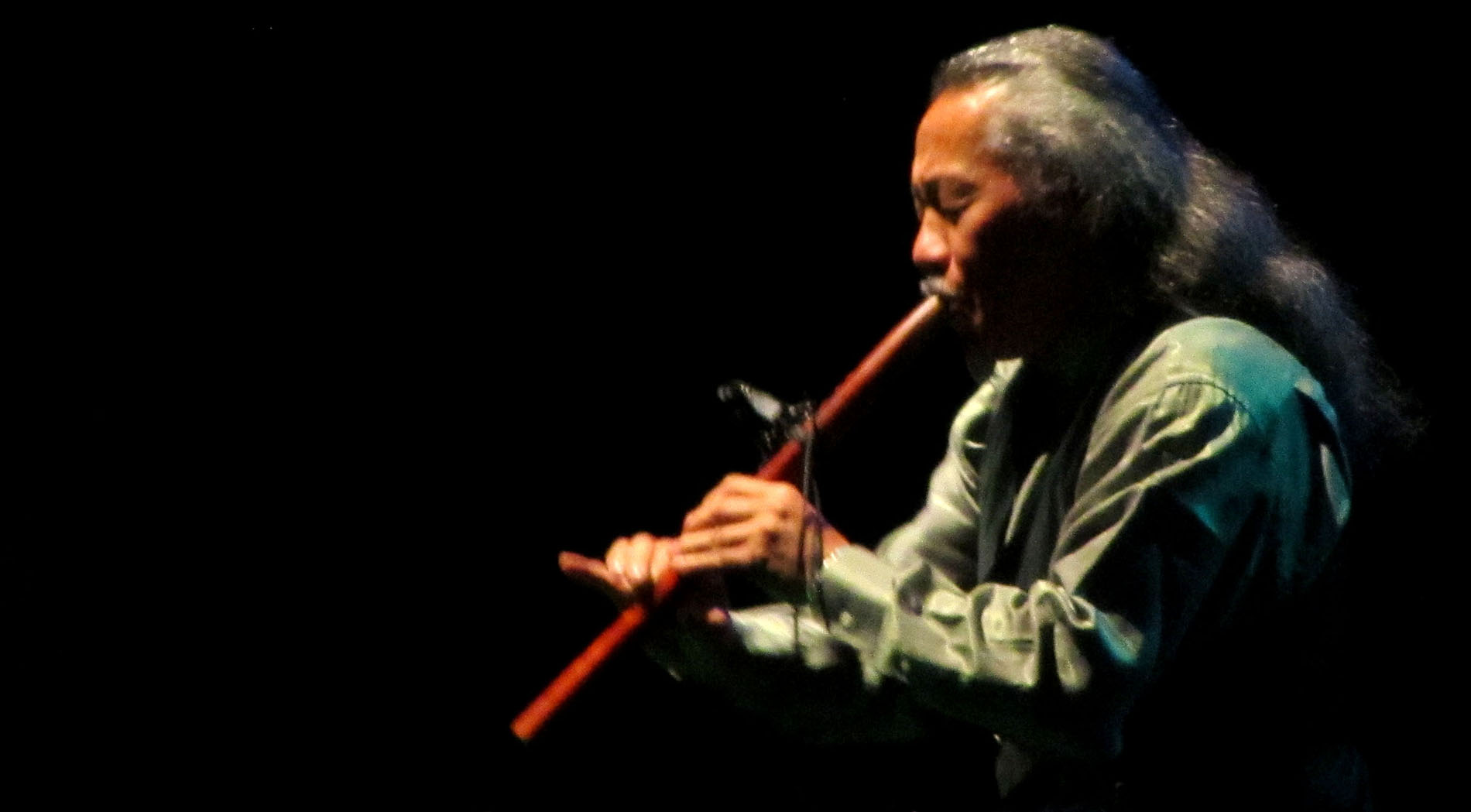
Kitaro playing in Tehran, October 2014

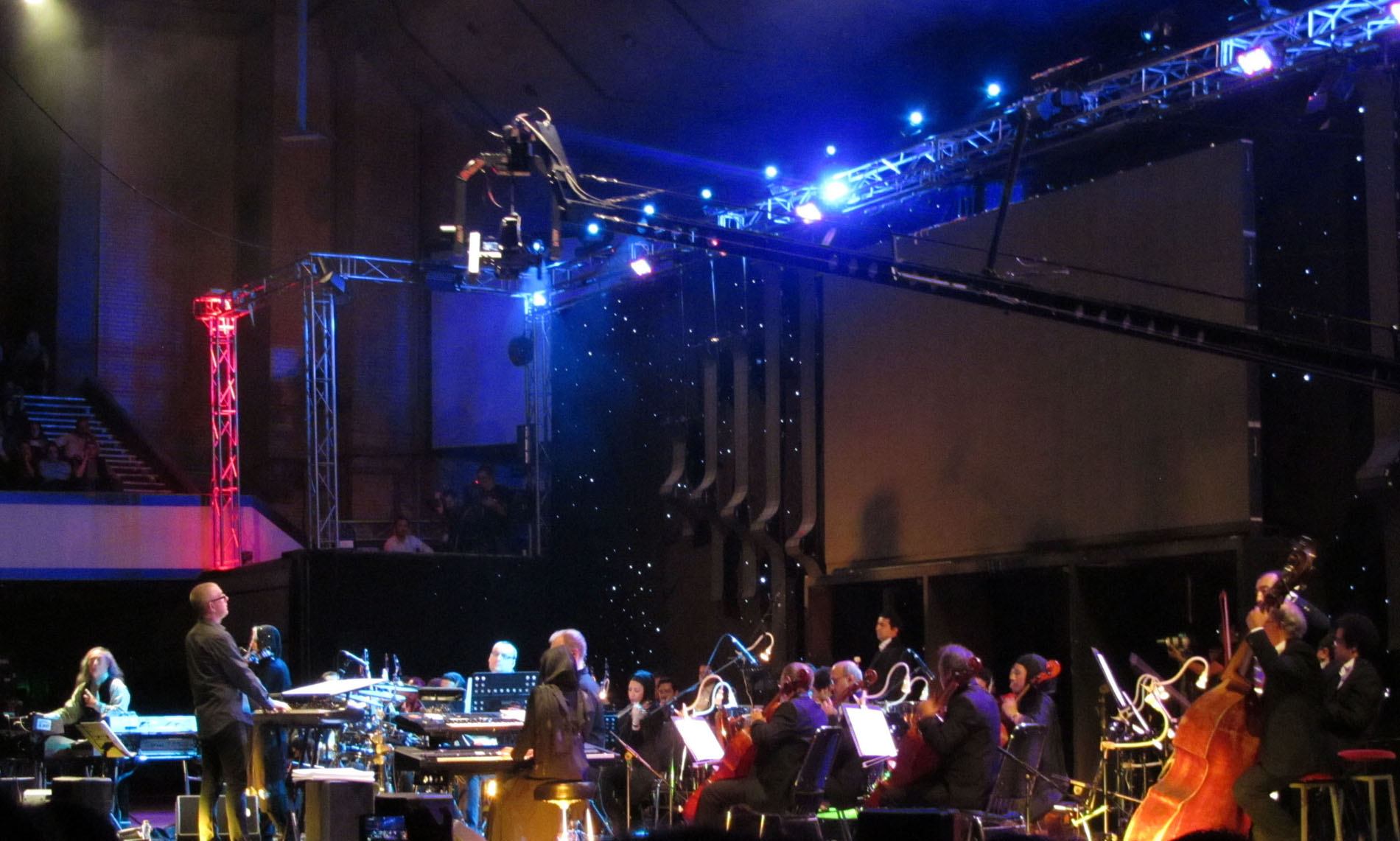
Kitaro playing with the orchestra in Tehran, 2014

Kitaro's latest studio album is Final Call, which is a homage to Kitaro's lifetime reverence for nature and was released in September 2013. A year later, in September 2014, his latest live album Symphony Live in Istanbul was released. It was recorded live at the Halic Congress Center in Istanbul, Turkey during Kitaro's Symphonic World Tour, balancing the artist's trademark signature sound and expanding it to new heights with the addition of a 38-piece chamber symphony orchestra. Both Final Call and Symphony Live in Istanbul were nominated for Best New Age Album, becoming Kitaro's 15th and 16th career Grammy Award nominations. More recently he has reissued his critically acclaimed studio albums Kojiki in 2015 and Tenku in 2016.

=== Touring and other activities ===
In 2007 to 2009, he launched the "Love and Peace World Tour," an international tour with which Kitaro hoped to inspire his message of world peace with his music. Kitaro toured Southeast Asia in 2007, Greece in 2008 and Hong Kong, Japan, Southeast Asia in 2009. During his visit to Greece, Kitaro met Greek composer Vangelis, and exchanged musical experience and creative ideas.

In 2010, Kitaro performed in Singapore in March, in Mexico for the Zacatecas Cultural Festival in April, in Xi'an, China for the opening event of Daming Palace National Heritage Park in September, in Aichi, Japan, for the Thousand Drums Event at COP10 for the Convention on Biological Diversity in October. From March to April, 2011, he was on a tour titled The Silk Road – East & West, visiting Thailand, Hong Kong, Indonesia, Singapore and Malaysia. He donated part of the CD sales and concert profits to Tōhoku earthquake and tsunami Relief. For the same purpose he participated in the 2011 edition of Musicians United for Safe Energy. In 2012 he released Let Mother Earth Speak, a collaboration album with Native American activist Dennis Banks.

== Personal life ==
From around 1983 to 1990, Kitarō was married to Yuki Taoka, daughter of Kazuo Taoka. They have a son. In the early 1990s, he moved from Japan to the United States. In the mid-1990s, he married Keiko Matsubara, a musician who played on several of his albums. Along with Keiko's son, the couple lived in Ward, Colorado, on a 180-acre (72.85 hectare) spread and composed in his 2500-square-foot (230 m^{2}) home studio "Mochi House" (it is large enough to hold a 70-piece orchestra). Around 2005, they relocated to Sebastopol, California. Kitaro subsequently divorced Keiko (she was visibly absent from the performances during 2020-2021 period). On 24 February 2022, he married Brazil-born, ethnically Japanese artist Franci Shimomaebara in a private ceremony attended by friends and relatives. They had met in 1990, and after becoming friends worked together on The Wind, which was featured on Kitarō's Grammy-nominated 2003 album, Sacred Journey of Ku-Kai, Volume 1. In 2012 they collaborated on the album Symphony of my Dreams where Franci recorded vocal renditions of some of Kitarō's famous pieces, including Silk Road.

== Discography ==
Studio albums

- Tenkai (aka Astral Voyage, 1978)
- Daichi (aka Full Moon Story, 1979)
- Oasis (1979)
- Ki (1981)
- Silver Cloud (aka Cloud, 1983)
- Toward the West (1985)
- Tenku (1986)
- The Light of the Spirit (1987)
- Kojiki (1990)
- Dream (1992)
- Mandala (1994)
- Peace on Earth (1996)
- Cirque Ingenieux (1997)
- Gaia-Onbashira (1998)
- Thinking of You (1999)
- Ancient (2001)
- An Ancient Journey (2002)
- Sacred Journey of Ku-Kai Vol. 1 (2003)
- Sacred Journey of Ku-Kai Vol. 2 (2005)
- Spiritual Garden (2006)
- Sacred Journey of Ku-Kai Vol. 3 (2007)
- Sacred Journey of Ku-Kai Vol. 4 (2010)
- Final Call (2013)
- Sacred Journey of Ku-Kai Vol. 5 (2017)

== Tours ==
- 1986: "Japan Tour" (17 cities)
- 1987: "1st North American Tour" (24 cities, 26 shows)
- 1989: "1st Europe Tour" (15 cities, 16 shows)
- 1990: "Kojiki World Tour" U.S., Japan, Europe (39 cities, 41 shows)
- 1992: "Dream World Tour" U.S., Japan, Asia
- 1992: "Her Majestry Queen" Sirikit Birthday Anniversary Concert, in Bangkok, Thailand
- 1994: "The Kitaro Mandala World Tour" Latin America Tour (4 cities, 6 shows)
- 1994: "The Kitaro Mandala World Tour" The USA Tour (32 shows)
- 1995: "Southeast Asia tour" (4 cities, 9 shows)
- 1995: "Kitaro Enchanted Evening Tour" (22 cities, 22 shows)
- 1997: "Kitaro's Peace on Earth Holiday Tour" in USA (5 cities, 5 shows)
- 1998: "Europe Tour" (13 cities)
- 1999: "Kitaro 1999 New Millennium World Tour in USA" (21cities)
- 1999: "Kitaro 1999 New Millennium World Tour in South America"
- 2000: "Kitaro Asia 2000" in Malaysia, Singapore, Hong Kong
- 2002: "The Silk Road Tour in USA" (6 cities)
- 2002: "The concert for 30th anniversary of diplomatic ties between Japan and China" in China (2 cities)
- 2004: "Asia Tour 2004" (7 cities, 8 shows)
- 2007: "Love & Peace World Tour 2007" in Philippines, Taiwan, Malaysia, Indonesia, Singapore, Thailand
- 2008: "Love & Peace World Tour 2008" in Athens
- 2009: "Love & Peace Planet Music Tour 2009" in Malaysia, Singapore, India, Japan, Hong Kong
- 2009: "31st Harmony Festival" in Santa Rosa, California
- 2009: "Silk Road Arts Festival" in Hong Kong, China
- 2010: "Love & Peace Planet Music Tour 2010" in Singapore
- 2010: "Zacatecas Cultural Festival" in Mexico
- 2010: "Opening Ceremony for 32nd Harmony Festival" in Santa Rosa, California
- 2010: "Opening Event of Daming Palace National Heritage Park" in Xi'an, China
- 2010: "Thousand Drums Event at COP10 for Convention on Biological Diversity" in Aichi, Japan
- 2010: "Asian Art Museum" in San Francisco, California
- 2011: "Silk Road East & West Tour" in Bangkok, Hong Kong, Jakarta, Singapore and Malaysia
- 2011: "Closing Ceremony for 33rd Harmony Festival" in Santa Rosa, California
- 2011: "Opening Ceremony for Musicians United For Safe Energy (MUSE) Benefit Concert" in Mountain View, California
- 2012: "Festival International Farosor 2012" in Montevideo, Uruguay
- 2014: "Symphonic World Tour|Symphonic World Tour 2014"

== Awards ==
- 1985: Hong Kong Film Awards nomination for Homecoming
- 1987: Grammy nomination for The Field
- 1990: Grammy nomination for Kojiki
- 1991: Gold Disc Award winner (Japan) for Kojiki
- 1992: Grammy nomination for Dream
- 1993: Golden Globe Award winner for Heaven & Earth
- 1994: Grammy nomination for Mandala
- 1995: Grammy nomination for An Enchanted Evening
- 1998: Grammy nomination for Gaia Onbashira
  - Golden Horse Award winner (Hong Kong) for Soong Sisters
- 1999: Grammy Award winner for Thinking Of You
- 2002: Grammy nomination for Ancient
- 2003: Grammy nomination for An Ancient Journey
- 2004: Grammy nomination for Sacred Journey of Ku-Kai Volume 1
- 2006: Grammy nomination for Sacred Journey Of Ku-Kai Volume 2
- 2008: Grammy nomination for Sacred Journey Of Ku-Kai Volume 3
- 2009: Grammy nomination for Impressions Of The West Lake
- 2011: Grammy nomination for Sacred Journey Of Ku-Kai Volume 4
- 2013: Grammy nomination for Final Call
- 2014: Grammy nomination for Symphony Live In Istanbul
- 2017: Grammy nomination for Sacred Journey of Ku-Kai Vol. 5

== See also ==
- List of ambient music artists
