= Domo Records =

American record label

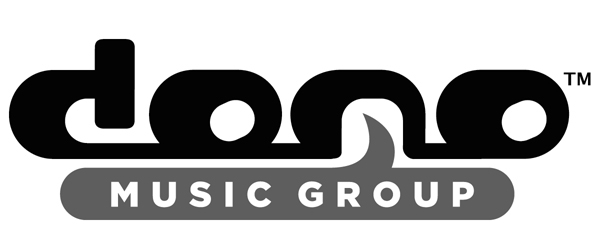
- Founded: 1993
- Founder: Eiichi Naito
- Distributor: MVD Entertainment Group
- Genre: New-age, world, electronic, indie rock, J-pop
- Country of origin: U.S.A.
- Location: Los Angeles, California
- Official website: www.domomusicgroup.com

Domo Records is an independent record label based in Los Angeles, California.

Domo Records was established in 1993 by Eiichi Naito, a record producer, recording engineer, and artist manager. Domo is an abbreviation and romanization of the Japanese expression dōmo arigatō (どうもありがとう), which means "thank you very much" in Japanese.

Domo Records first signee was Japanese composer Kitarō, who in 1994 won a Golden Globe for Best Original Score with his soundtrack to the Oliver Stone film Heaven & Earth and in 2001, won a Grammy Award for Best New Age Album for Thinking of You. Kitaro's albums with Domo Records have received sixteen Grammy Award nominations.

The label has been distributed by Narada, Virgin/EMI Records, Fontana Distribution/Universal, Allegro Media Group, and Entertainment One Distribution. The record label's executive team currently includes Eiichi Naito and Dino Malito.

Domo Records has continued to sign and develop other artists including the Yoshida Brothers, Dave Eggar, Seda Bağcan, Kuni Murai, Peas, Tao of Sound, Luna and The Viva Girls.

== Artists ==
Domo Records

- A New Revenge
- Aco Takenaka
- Akasau
- Akiko Kosaka
- Akiko Moriyako
- Agatsuma
- Aman Ryusuke Seto
- Benedetti & Svoboda
- Chuck Barris
- Dave Eggar
- Dennis Banks
- Dino Malito
- Ema & Esoh
- Fiddle Witch & The Demons Of Doom
- Franci
- Fumio Miyashita
- Han
- Harleigh Cole
- Hiroki Okano
- Horny Toad
- Jazz On The Vine
- Jean-Francois Maljean
- Kitarō
- Kotahi Te Wairua
- Kuni Murai
- Lee Blaske
- Luis Perez
- Luis Villegas
- Luna
- Masa Takumi
- Michael Vescera
- Michel Huygen
- Minmi
- Nao Watanabe
- Nawang Khechog
- Neuronium
- Nicholas Olate
- Ninja Scroll
- Olate Dogs
- Peas
- Randy Armstrong
- Randy Miller (composer)
- Ray Obiedo
- Rin'
- Sangeeta Kaur
- Sapphron Obois
- Seda Bağcan
- Shinji
- Shinji Ebihara
- Stableford
- Stephen DeRuby
- Stephen Small
- Steve Reid
- Susan Mazer and Dallas Smith
- Tao Of Sound
- The Violet Burning
- Uma Silbey
- ViVA Girls
- Yoshida Brothers
- Yukiko Haneda

Daruma Label

- Coma*
- Jabberloop
- M-Swift
- Kaoru Ono
- Miu-Clips
- Michina & Tomo

Kanpai Records

- Appogee
- Indicia
- Little Plastic Pilots
- Peas
- Prototokyo
- Test Shot Starfish
- Hoppy Kamiyama & Bill Laswell
- The Saboten

== Soundtracks ==
- Soong Sisters (2000)
- Metropolis (2002)
- Confessions Of A Dangerous Mind (2003)
- Ninja Scroll (2003)
- Steamboy (2005)
- Impressions Of The West Lake (2009)
- Toyo's Camera (2009)
- 442 – Extreme Patriots Of WWII (2010)
- Forest Of Time (2012)
- An Ethics Lesson (2013)
- Foulball (2015)
