= Lunas del Auditorio =

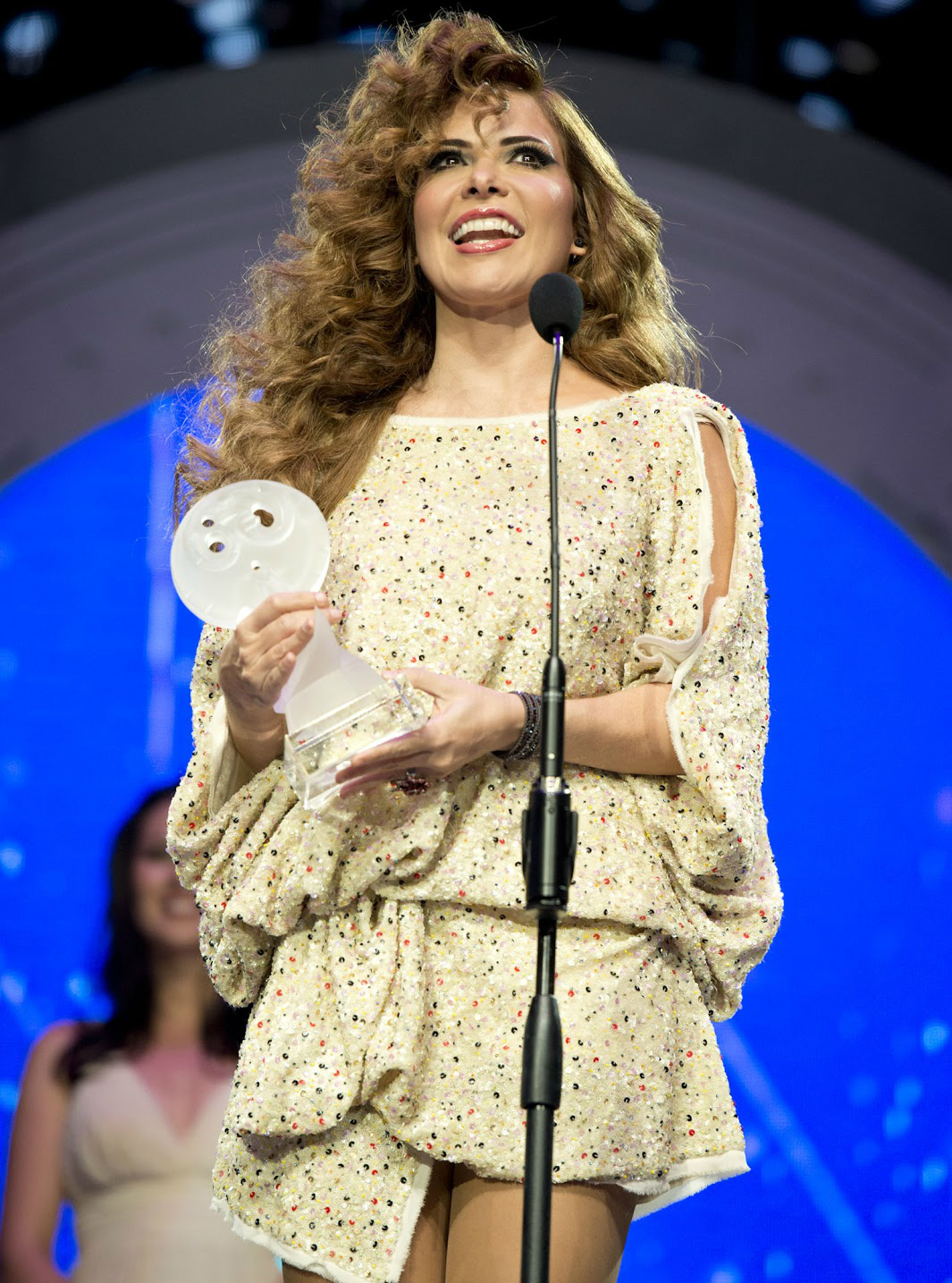
- Mexican singer Gloria Trevi holding a Lunas del Auditorio trophy
- Awarded for: Music achievements
- Country: Mexico
- First award: 2002; 24 years ago
- Website: Lunas del Auditorio

Lunas del Auditorio (lit. 'Auditorium Moons') was an award given by the Auditorio Nacional to the best live concerts in Mexico, created in 2002 to celebrate the 50th anniversary of the Auditorio Nacional. Its objective was to reward groups, companies and soloists in Mexico.

The trophy is a replica of the sculpture of the Moon by the sculptor Juan Soriano. The ceremony was broadcast by Televisa, TV Azteca, Secretariat of Culture's Canal 22 and Instituto Politécnico Nacional's Canal Once. Since its 1st edition, the awards were presented annually until 2019. However, they were cancelled between 2020 and 2022 due to the COVID-19 pandemic, with the announcement that they would resume in 2023, although this has not happened so far. A very important element of the awards ceremony is the stage design, which from 2010 to 2017, which was designed by architect Mauricio Chacón Granados in collaboration with various departments of the National Auditorium, production, and talented creatives from other areas who have brought to life a stage that accompanies the award winners in an impressive and wonderful event.

== Winners ==
=== 2002 ===
- Career as a Composer and Performer: Armando Manzanero
- A Life on Stage: María Victoria
- Artistic Career: Luis Miguel
- Rock in Spanish: El Tri
- Foreign Language Rock: Eric Clapton
- Pop in Spanish: Aleks Syntek
- Foreign Language Pop: Miguel Bosé
- Ballad: Alejandro Sanz
- Jazz & Blues: Diana Krall
- Grupera Music: Celso Piña
- African Rhythms: Buena Vista Social Club
- Mexican Music: Alejandro Fernández
- Latin American Music to the World: Joan Manuel Serrat
- Family Show: Disney on Ice
- Research and Recovery: Óscar Chávez
- Classical Show: Madama Butterfly
- Dance: Mariinsky Ballet (Don Quixote - Swan Lake - Ballet Gala)
- Musical Theater: The Phantom of the Opera
- Revelation: Elefante
- Sponsor: Telmex

=== 2003 ===
- Artistic Trajectory: Chespirito
- A Life on Stage: Silvia Pinal
- Spanish Rock: Café Tacuba
- Foreign Language Rock: Peter Gabriel
- Spanish Pop: Shakira
- Foreign Language Pop: Paul McCartney
- Ballad: Rosana Arbelo
- Jazz & Blues: Pat Metheny Group
- Grupera Music: Los Tigres del Norte
- African Rhythms: Celia Cruz
- Mexican Music: Vicente Fernández and Alejandro Fernandez
- Ibero-American Music to the World: Tania Libertad
- Family Show: Cirque du Soleil
- Research and Recovery: Ballet Folklorico de Mexico
- Classical Show: Das Rheingold
- Dance: Mariinsky Ballet
- Musical Theater: Les Misérables
- Alternative Show: Marcel Marceau
- Alternative Cultural Promotion: Dfiesta Program in Mexico City, of the Government of the Federal District
- Revelation: Yahir

=== 2004 ===
- Artistic Trajectory: Ernesto Alonso
- A Life on Stage: Amparo Arozamena
- Musical Composition: Rubén Fuentes
- Spanish Rock: Café Tacuba
- Spanish Pop: Alejandro Sanz
- Foreign Language Rock: Coldplay
- Foreign Language Pop: Air Supply
- Ballad: Sin Bandera
- Jazz and Blues: Lincoln Center Jazz Orchestra with Wynton Marsalis
- Grupera Music: Intocable
- African Rhythms: Ruben Blades
- Mexican Music: Pepe Aguilar
- Family Show: Cirque du Soleil
- Research and Recovery: Ballet Folklorico de Mexico
- Alternative Show: Festival Alternative (Café Tacuba, La Mala Rodriguez, Cerati, Placebo, Kinky)
- Classical Show: National Symphony Orchestra
- Dance: Spanish National Dance Company
- Musical Theater: Les Misérables
- Forger of the Popular Imagination: Manuel Esperón
- Artistic Innovation: Miguel Bosé
- Latin American Music to the World: Joan Manuel Serrat
- Revelation: Angélica Vale

=== 2005 ===
- Artistic Trajectory: Ignacio López Tarso
- A Life on Stage: Carmen Montejo
- Spanish Rock: Café Tacuba
- Spanish Pop: Diego Torres
- Ballad: Sin Bandera
- African Rhythms: International Sonora Santanera
- Mexican Music: Juan Gabriel
- Classical Show: Carmina Burana Monumental Opera
- Modern Dance: Spanish National Dance Company (Carmina Burana - Dionaea - The Nutcracker - Swan Lake)
- Ballet: Ballet Bolshoi
- Musical Theater: Fiddler on the Roof
- Family Show: Disney on Ice
- Jazz and Blues: Jazz Festival 2005 (Diana Krall, Mike Stern, Chucho Valdes, Wayne Shorter, Maria Rita, Yellowjackets)
- Research and Recovery: La Guelaguetza
- Grupera Music: Intocable
- Latin American Music to the World: Chucho Valdés and Diego el Cigala
- Alternative Show: Stomp
- Foreign Language Rock: Lenny Kravitz
- Foreign Language Pop: Eros Ramazzotti
- Revelation: Moderatto

=== 2006 ===
- Artistic Career: Jose Angel Espinoza
- A Life on Stage: Manuel "El Loco" Valdés
- Mexican Artist with International Projection: Alejandro Fernandez
- Spanish Rock: Alejandra Guzman
- Foreign Language Rock: U2
- Spanish Pop: Luis Miguel
- Foreign Language Pop: Air Supply
- Ballad: Raphael
- Jazz and Blue: Jazz Chick Corea and Touchstone
- Grupera Music: Intocable
- African Rhythms: Buena Vista Social Club
- Mexican Music: Alejandro Fernandez
- Latin American Music to the World: Diego el Cigala
- Family Show: Cirque du Soleil Saltimbanco
- Alternative Show: Nevermore: A Concert for Life
- Classical Show: Vienna Philharmonic Orchestra Director Riccardo Muti
- Modern Dance: Ballet Theater Space, 2002 Carmen
- Musical Theater: Cabaret
- Ballet: Ballet of the Teatro alla Scala in Milan in June
- Electronic Music: Moby
- Tradition and Folklore: Jarocho
- Revelation: Zoé

=== 2007 ===
- Artistic Career: Marco Antonio Muñiz
- A Life on Stage: Sergio Corona
- Spanish Rock: Zoé
- Foreign Language Rock: Coldplay
- Spanish Pop: Shakira
- Foreign Language Pop: Robbie Williams
- Ballad: From A to Z (Armando Manzanero and Susana Zabaleta)
- Jazz and Blues: Jazz Festival 2006 Mexico City
- Grupera Music: K-Paz de la Sierra
- African Rhythms: Celsus Pineapple
- Mexican Music: Alejandro Fernández
- Latin American Music to the World: Joaquín Sabina
- Family Show: Slava's Snowshow
- Alternative Show: Festival Vive Latino 2006
- Classical Show: Aida, Opera monumental fire
- Modern Dance: Corner Down! (Spanish National Dance Company)
- Musical Theater: Hoy no me Puedo Levantar
- Ballet: Sleeping Beauty (Spanish National Dance Company)
- Electronic Music: Depeche Mode
- Tradition and Folklore: Jarocho
- Spanish Pop - Revelation: Camila
- Renewed Tradition: Ana Ofelia Murguía

=== 2008 ===
- Artistic Trajectory: José José
- A Life on Stage: Fannie Kauffman
- Spanish Rock: Café Tacuba
- Foreign Language Pop: Alizée
- Ballad: Emmanuel
- Grupera Music: Banda el Recodo
- Ibero-American Music: Dos Pájaros de un Tiro (Joan Manuel Serrat and Joaquín Sabina)
- Family Show: Quidam (Cirque du Soleil)
- Alternative Show: Fuerza Bruta
- Modern Dance: Ballet Theater Space
- Ballet: Royal Ballet in London in August
- Musical Theater: The Lion King
- Foreign Language Rock: Bob Dylan
- Jazz and Blues: Bobby McFerrin
- Classical Show: Ennio Morricone (Music per il cinema)
- Electronic Music: Daft Punk
- World Music: Manu Chao
- Pop in Spanish: Miguel Bosé
- Mexican Music: Juan Gabriel
- Tradition and Folklore: Chavela Vargas
- African-American Music: Omara Portuondo
- Revelation: Ximena Sariñana

=== 2009 ===
- Artistic Trajectory: Banda el Recodo
- A Life on Stage: Elsa Aguirre
- Spanish Rock: Café Tacuba
- Foreign Language Rock: Radiohead
- Spanish Pop: Miguel Bosé
- Foreign Language Pop: Madonna
- Ballad: Yuri
- Jazz and Blues: Béla Fleck & the Flecktones
- Grupera Music: Los Tigres del Norte
- African Rhythms: Sonora Santanera
- Mexican Music: Alejandro Fernández
- Latin American Music: Joan Manuel Serrat
- Latin American Music to the World: Isabel Pantoja
- Family Show: Slava's Snowshow
- Research and Recovery: Ema Elena Valdelamar
- Classical Show: Plácido Domingo
- Dance: National Contemporary Dance Company of Cuba (Carmina Burana)
- Musical Theater: The Sound of Music
- World Music: Manu Chao
- Tradition and Folklore: Joaquín Cortés
- Electronic Music: Kinky
- Ballet: Compañía Nacional de Danza y Orquesta del Teatro de Bellas Artes (The Nutcracker)
- Alternative Show: Lila Downs
- Composition for Mexico de Siempre: Emma Elena Valdelamar
- Revelation: Alexander Acha

=== 2010 ===
- Artistic Career: Yolanda Montes
- A Life on Stage: Xavier López Chabelo
- Foreign Language Rock: Paul McCartney
- Foreign Language Pop: Elton John
- Ballad: Reyli
- Grupera Music: La Arrolladora Banda El Limón
- Classical Show: National Opera Company
- Only the Truth: The True Story of Camelia La Texana
- Modern Dance: National Dance Company of the INBA. Carmina Burana and Esquina Bajan. Tribute to Nellie Happee
- Musical Theater: Lies, the Musical
- Traditional Music: Susana Harp and the IPN Symphony Orchestra. Of revelry and velorios
- Jazz and Blues: Paté de Fuá
- Mexican Music: Pedro Fernández
- Ballet: Ballet of Kiev
- World Music: Lila Downs
- Electronic Music: Kinky
- Ibero-American Music: Diego el Cigala
- Family Show: Circo Atayde
- Alternative Show: Brute Force
- Traditional Dance: Joaquín Cortés
- Rock in Spanish: Enrique Bunbury
- Pop in Spanish: Julieta Venegas
- African-American Music: Ruben Blades
- Revelation: Hello Seahorse!

=== 2011 ===
- Artistic Career: Joaquín Cordero
- A Life on Stage: Julio Alemán
- Spanish Rock: Zoé
- Foreign Language Rock: U2
- Spanish Pop: Camila
- Foreign Language Pop: The Black Eyed Peas
- Electronic Music: David Guetta
- Jazz and Blues: Let's celebrate America; Jazz at Lincoln Center Orchestra with Wynton Marsalis; Paquito de Rivera; Antonio Sánchez; Diego Urcola and Edmar Castañeda
- Grupera Music: Espinoza Paz
- African-American Music: Calle 13
- Mexican Music: Alejandro Fernández
- Ibero-American Music: Joan Manuel Serrat
- Music Theater: Mamma Mia
- Traditional Music: The Folkloristas 2011
- Ballad: Marco Antonio Solís
- Modern Dance: Pilobolus Dance Theater
- Traditional Dance: La Guelaguetza
- Alternative Show: Philip Glass
- Family Show: Slava's Snowshow
- Classical Show: Alondra de la Parra and Plácido Domingo: Mexico celebrates Plácido Domingo in concert
- World Music: Emir Kusturika / The No Smoking Orchestra
- Ballet: Spanish National Dance Company
- Revelation: Espinoza Paz

=== 2012 ===
- Artistic Career: Óscar Chávez
- A Life on Stage: Angélica María
- Ibero-American Artistic Legacy : Joaquín Sabina and Joan Manuel Serrat
- Spanish Rock: Wirikuta Fest
- Foreign Language Rock: Paul McCartney
- Spanish Pop: Gloria Trevi
- Foreign Language Pop: Elton John
- Electronic Music: Nortec Collective Presents: Bostich + Fussible
- Jazz and Blues: Michael Bublé
- Grupera Music: Jenni Rivera
- African-American Music: Buena Vista Social Club, Omara Portuondo
- Mexican Music: Pedro Fernández
- Latin American Music: Chavela Vargas (La Luna Grande - Homage to García Lorca)
- Ballad: Cristian Castro
- Alternative Show: Lila Downs: Pecados y milagros
- Family Show: Cirque du Soleil: Ovo
- Classical Show: André Rieu & His Johann Strauss Orchestra
- Modern Dance: Compañía Tania Pérez-Salas (Pasión por la Danza)
- Theatrical Musical: Mentiras - The Musical
- World Music: Julia Migenes, Teresa Salgueiro, Angélique Kidjo, Mala Rodríguez, Bebel Gilberto, Olivia Gorra and Denise de Kalafe: Women of the World Sing
- Ballet: Spanish National Dance Company (The Nutcracker)
- Traditional Dance: Ballet Folklórico de México of Amalia Hernández
- Traditional Music: Diego el Cigala: Cigala & Tango
- Revelation: Group Torreblanca

=== 2013 ===
- Artistic Career: Vargas de Tecalitlán
- A Life on Stage: Héctor Bonilla
- Spanish Rock: Caifanes
- Foreign Language Rock: Metallica
- Spanish Pop: Emmanuel & Manuel Mijares
- Foreign Language Pop: Madonna
- Electronic Music: David Guetta
- Jazz and Blues: Paté de Fuá
- Grupera Music: La Arrolladora Banda El Limón
- African-American Music: Cumbre Tajín 2013
- Mexican Music: Alejandro Fernández
- Ibero-American Music: Joan Manuel Serrat and Joaquín Sabina
- Ballad: Franco De Vita
- Alternative Show: Lila Downs
- Family Show: Cirque du Soleil: Michael Jackson The Immortal World Tour
- Classical Show: Ópera de Bellas Artes: Carmen
- Modern Dance: Beijing Dance LDTX
- Musical Theater: Mary Poppins
- World Music: Concha Buika
- Festival: Clazz Continental Latin Jazz
- Ballet: Spanish National Dance Company (The Nutcracker)
- Traditional Dance: Ballet Folklórico de México of Amalia Hernández
- Traditional Music: Los Folkloristas - Viva México! Mi Canto Tiene Raíz (Guillermo Pérez Ávila, Patricio Hidalgo and Leovigildo Martínez Vásquez)
- Emblematic Venue: Hall Los Angeles
- Revelation: Jenny and the Mexicats

=== 2014 ===
- Artistic Trajectory: Fernando Luján
- A Life on Stage: José Solé
- Spanish Rock: Café Tacuba
- Spanish Rock / Precursors of the Contemporary Mexican Rock: Caifanes
- Foreign Language Rock: Santana
- Spanish Pop: Jesse & Joy
- Foreign Language Pop: Beyoncé
- Electronic Music: Avicii
- Jazz and Blues: Hugh Laurie and Copper Bottom Band
- Grupera Music: La Arrolladora Banda El Limón
- African-American music: Los Ángeles Azules
- Mexican Music: Alejandro Fernández
- Ibero-American Music: Joan Manuel Serrat
- Ballad: Franco de Vita
- Alternative Show: Lila Downs
- Family Show: Disney on Ice, Fun Forever
- Classical Show: Ópera de Bellas Artes: La Bohème
- Modern Dance: Quadrille: Dance Swan
- Musical Theater: Wicked (Danna Paola and Cecilia de la Cueva)
- World Music: Paco de Lucía
- Festival: Festival Internacional Cervantino
- Ballet: Spanish National Dance Company
- Traditional Dance: Guelaguetza 2013
- Traditional Music: Diego el Cigala
- Emblematic Venue: Palace of Fine Arts
- Artistic Revelation: Sofi Mayen

=== 2015 ===
- Artistic Career: Los Tigres del Norte
- A Life on Stage: Diana Bracho
- Spanish Rock: Café Tacuba
- Spanish Rock / Precursors of the Contemporary Mexican Rock: Jaime Lopez
- Foreign Language Rock: Carlos Santana
- Spanish Pop: Ricky Martin
- Foreign Language Pop: Bruno Mars
- Electronic Music: Paul van Dyk
- Jazz and Blues: Michael Bublé
- Grupera Music: Julión Álvarez
- African-American Music: Los Ángeles Azules
- Mexican Music: Juan Gabriel
- Ibero-American Music: Joaquin Sabina
- Ballad: Camila
- Alternative Show: Lila Downs
- Family Show: Cirque du Soleil
- Classical Show: Symphony Orchestra Mining
- Modern Dance: Mexico City Ballet
- Musical Theater: The Lion King
- World Music: Ten Pianos
- Festival: Latin American Festival Vive Latino
- Ballet: Spanish National Dance Company
- Traditional Dance: Guelaguetza 2014
- Traditional Music: Son de Madera
- Precinct Landmark: Teatro Degollado
- Artistic Revelation: Caloncho

=== 2016 ===
- Artistic Career: Luz Maria Aguilar
- A Life on Stage: Susana Alexander
- Spanish Pop: Café Tacuba and Zoé
- Spanish Rock / Precursors of the Contemporary Mexican Rock: Cecilia Toussaint
- Foreign Language Rock: The Rolling Stones
- Spanish Pop: OV7 and Kabah
- Foreign Language Pop: Coldplay
- Electronic Music: David Guetta
- Jazz and Blues: Paté de Fuá
- Grupera Music: Julión Álvarez
- African-American Music: Los Ángeles Azules
- Mexican Music: Juan Gabriel
- Regional Mexican Music: La Arrolladora Banda El Limón
- Ibero-American Music: Pablo Milanes, Óscar Chávez and Fernando Delgadillo
- Ballad: Sin Bandera
- Alternative Show: Les Luthiers
- Family Show: Cirque du Soleil
- Classical Show: London Philharmonic Orchestra directed by Alondra de la Parr
- Modern Dance: Blanca Li
- Musical Theater: The Lion King
- World Music: Los Pericos
- Festival: XLIII Festival Internacional Cervantino
- Ballet: Spanish National Dance Company
- Traditional Dance: Ballet Folkloric of the University of Colima
- Traditional Music: Susana Harp
- Emblematic Venue: Teatro Macedonio Alcalá
- Artistic Revelation: Felipe El Hombre

=== 2017 ===
- Artistic Career: Enrique Guzman
- A Life on Stage: Ernesto Gomez Cruz
- Spanish Rock: Café Tacuba
- Spanish Rock / Precursors of the Contemporary Mexican Rock: Cecilia Toussaint
- Foreign Language Rock: Roger Waters
- Spanish Pop: Emmanuel & Mijares
- Foreign Language Pop: Ed Sheeran
- Electronic Music: Nortec Collective: Bostich + Fussible
- Jazz and Blues: Paco de Maria: Mexico Big Band Sounds
- Urban Music: Maluma
- Grupera Music: Julión Álvarez
- African-American Music: Los Ángeles Azules
- Mexican Music: Lila Downs
- Regional Mexican Music: Banda Sinaloense MS of Sergio Lizárraga
- Ibero-American Music: El Gusto es Nuestro: Joan Manuel Serrat, Miguel Ríos, Victor Manuel and Ana Belén
- Ballad: Carlos Rivera
- Alternative Show: Apocalyptica
- Family Show: Harry Potter and the Philosopher's Stone with the Orquesta Internacional de las Arte
- Classical Show: Ópera de Bellas Artes: Lucia di Lammermoor
- Modern Dance: First Contemporary Dance International Festival of Mexico City
- Musical Theater: El Hombre de la Mancha
- World Music: El Show de los 10 Pianos
- Festival: Corona Capital
- Ballet: Ballet of Jalisco: Don Quijote
- Traditional Dance: Guelaguetza
- Traditional Music: Diego el Cigala
- Precinct Landmark: Teatro Juárez
- Artistic Revelation: LNG / SHT

=== 2018 ===
- Artistic Career: Horacio Franco
- International Career: Isaac Hernandez
- A Life on Stage: Patricia Reyes Spíndola
- Spanish Rock: Café Tacuba
- Foreign Language Rock: Depeche Mode
- Spanish Pop: Timbiriche
- Foreign Language Pop: Bruno Mars
- Electronic Music: Dimitri Vegas & Like Mike
- Jazz and Blues: Diana Krall
- Urban Music: J Balvin
- Grupera Music: Julión Álvarez
- African-American Music: Willie Colon: The King of Salsa
- Mexican Music: Aida Cuevas
- Regional Mexican Music: Banda Sinaloense MS of Sergio Lizárraga
- Ibero-American Music: Jorge Drexler
- Ballad: Carlos Rivera
- Alternative Entertainment: Cirque du Soleil
- Family Show: Disney On Ice: Follow your Emotions
- Classical Show: Vienna Philharmonic conducted by Gustavo Dudamel
- Modern Dance: 2nd Contemporary Dance International Festival of Mexico City
- Musical Theater: Billy Elliot the Musical
- World Music: La Santa Cecilia
- Festival: XLV Festival Internacional Cervantino
- Ballet: Ballet de Monterrey: The Phantom of the Opera, The Nutcracker and Swan Lake: Passion in Black and White
- Traditional Dance: Ballet Folklorico de Mexico of Amalia Hernandez
- Traditional Music: Omara Portuondo and Diego el Cigala: Omara & Diego
- Emblematic Venue: Teatro de la Ciudad Esperanza Iris
- Artistic Revelation: El David Aguilar

=== 2019 ===
- Foreign Language Rock: Roger Waters
- Spanish Pop: Timbiriche
- Jazz and Blues: Big Band Jazz of México
- Regional Mexican Music: Los Tigres del Norte
- African-American Music: Los Ángeles Azules
- Mexican Music: Lila Downs
- Ibero-American Music: Cantautores presenta: Delgadillo, Filio y Oceransky
- Ballad: Carlos Rivera
- Alternative Show: Tokyo Ska Paradise Orchestra
- Family Show: Cirque du Soleil: Luzia
- Classical Show: Orquesta Filarmónica of UNAM
- Modern Dance: Compañía Nacional de Danza: Carmina Burana
- Ballet: Isaac Hernández: Despertares
- Traditional Dance: La Guelaguetza
- Traditional Music: Los Cojolites & Ampersand
- World Music: Los Pericos
- Festival: Vive Latino 2019
- Urban Music: Sebastián Yatra
- Musical Theater: Les Misérables
- Foreign Language Rock: Roger Waters
- Spanish Pop: Timbiriche
- Foreign Language Pop: Phil Collins
- Electronic Music: The Chemical Brothers
- Revelation: Ed Maverick
- A Life on Stage: Rafael Inclán
- Artistic Trajectory: Gloria Trevi
- Emblematic Venue: Teatro Ángela Peralta Mazatlán, Sinaloa
