= Pecadora (song) =

Single by Lila Downs

from the album Pecados y milagros
- Released: November 21, 2011
- Genre: world music, ska
- Length: 4.08
- Label: Sony Music Latin
- Songwriter(s): Lila Downs, Paul Cohen
- Producer(s): Paul Cohen Aneiro Taño

Lila Downs singles chronology
"Palomo del comalito" (2011)	"Pecadora" (2011)	"Mezcalito" (2012)

"Pecadora" is the second single and title track of Mexican singer-songwriter Lila Downs's third Spanish album Pecados y Milagros. The song was written by Lila Downs and Paul Cohen, and was released on November 21, 2011. "Pecadora" was announced as the second single from the album on November 19, 2011, via Lila Downs's official fan site.
