= Pecados y milagros =

Studio album by Lila Downs
- Released: October 18, 2011
- Recorded: 2011
- Studios: AT Studio (Mexico City); Soundworks Recording Studio (New York)
- Genres: Latin, world music, traditional
- Length: 46:04
- Languages: Spanish, Nahuatl
- Label: Sony Music Latin
- Producers: Lila Downs, Paul Cohen, Aneiro Taño

Lila Downs chronology
Lila Downs y La Misteriosa in París (2010)	Pecados y milagros (2011)

Singles from Pecados y milagros
- 1. "Palomo del comalito" Released: October 18, 2011; 2. "Pecadora" Released: November 21, 2011

Pecados y milagros (English: Sins and miracles) is the seventh studio album by Mexican singer-songwriter Lila Downs, released on October 18, 2011. The album cover was released on September 14, 2011.

The album debuted at number fifty two on the Billboard 200 becoming her fourth-highest peak on the chart. It also debuted at number one on the Billboard Top Latin Albums Chart and stayed there for over 3 consecutive weeks. This album has sold over 60,000 copies in the US and over 290,000 copies worldwide.

The album is the first album to win the Grammy Award for Best Regional Mexican Music Album (including Tejano) and the Latin Grammy Award for Best Folk Album.

== Recording and description ==
The album was recorded in Mexico City and New York. Downs describes the album musically as having "a strong rock side" along with "traditional" and "Latino" songs. Celso Duarte is one of several collaborators to appear on the album, featuring on the first single "Palomo del comalito".

Other collaborations are said to include songs with rappers Illya Kuryaki and the Valderramas, Celso Piña and Totó la Momposina.

Upon its release, Pecados y milagros received general acclaim from most music critics. At Metacritic, which assigns a normalized rating out of 100 to reviews from mainstream critics, the album received an average score of 89, based on 5 reviews, which indicates "universal acclaim".

The album has accounted for 9% of overall album sales for the Latin Top 100 albums and has reached and remained at number 2 on the Latin iTunes. The sales, chart position, and the heavily digital sales are records for Spanish-language albums released this year. This album debuted at number 57 on European Top 100 Albums after debuting at number 10 in Spain and Portugal and number 29 in France. After two weeks at number 39 on European Albums, the album moved up to a peak of number 20, spending a second week atop the French chart and climbing 3–1 in Italy. It's down 19–26 in Portugal. The album debuted at number 20 on French Physical Album Chart with sales of 10,500, becoming her highest-peaking album on the chart. It debuted at number 10 on the French Digital Album Chart with sales of 2,000. The album debuted at number 68 at German Album Chart and number 2 on German Downloads Chart. It has sold 30,000 copies in France alone since its release in October 2011.

According to Downs' label Sony Music, the album set the record for selling 30,000 copies in Mexico in three weeks.

== Track listing ==
No.	Title	Writer(s)	Length
1.	"Mezcalito"	Lila Downs/Paul Cohen	4:28
2.	"Tu Cárcel"	Marco Antonio Solís	3:44
3.	"Zapata se queda (feat. Totó la Momposina & Celso Piña)"	Lila Downs/Paul Cohen	4:25
4.	"Vámonos"	José Alfredo Jiménez	3:32
5.	"Cucurrucucú paloma"	Tomás Mendez	4:51
6.	"La reyna del inframundo"	Lila Downs/Paul Cohen	3:11
7.	"Fallaste corazón"	Cuco Sánchez	4:45
8.	"Solamente un día"	Lila Downs/Paul Cohen	3:43
9.	"Xochipitzahua (Flor menudita)"	Dominio Popular	1:13
10.	"Palomo del comalito (La molienda)"	Lila Downs/Paul Cohen	4:08
11.	"Dios nunca muere (feat. La Banda Tierra Mojada)"	Macedonio Alcalá/Julián Maqueo	4:56
12.	"Pecadora (feat. Emmanuel Horvilleur, Illya Kuryaki and the Valderramas)"	Lila Downs/Paul Cohen	4:08
13.	"Cruz de olvido"	Juan Zaizar	4:49
14.	"Misa oaxaqueña (feat. La Banda Tierra Mojada)"	Timoteo Cruz Santos	3:24

== Release history ==
Region	Date	Label	Catalog
France	October 26, 2011	Epic Records	
Canada	October 19, 2011	Sony Music	
Colombia	October 19, 2011	Sony Music	
Mexico	October 19, 2011	Sony Music	
United States	October 19, 2011	827226	
