= Lila Downs =

Mexican singer-songwriter (born 1968)

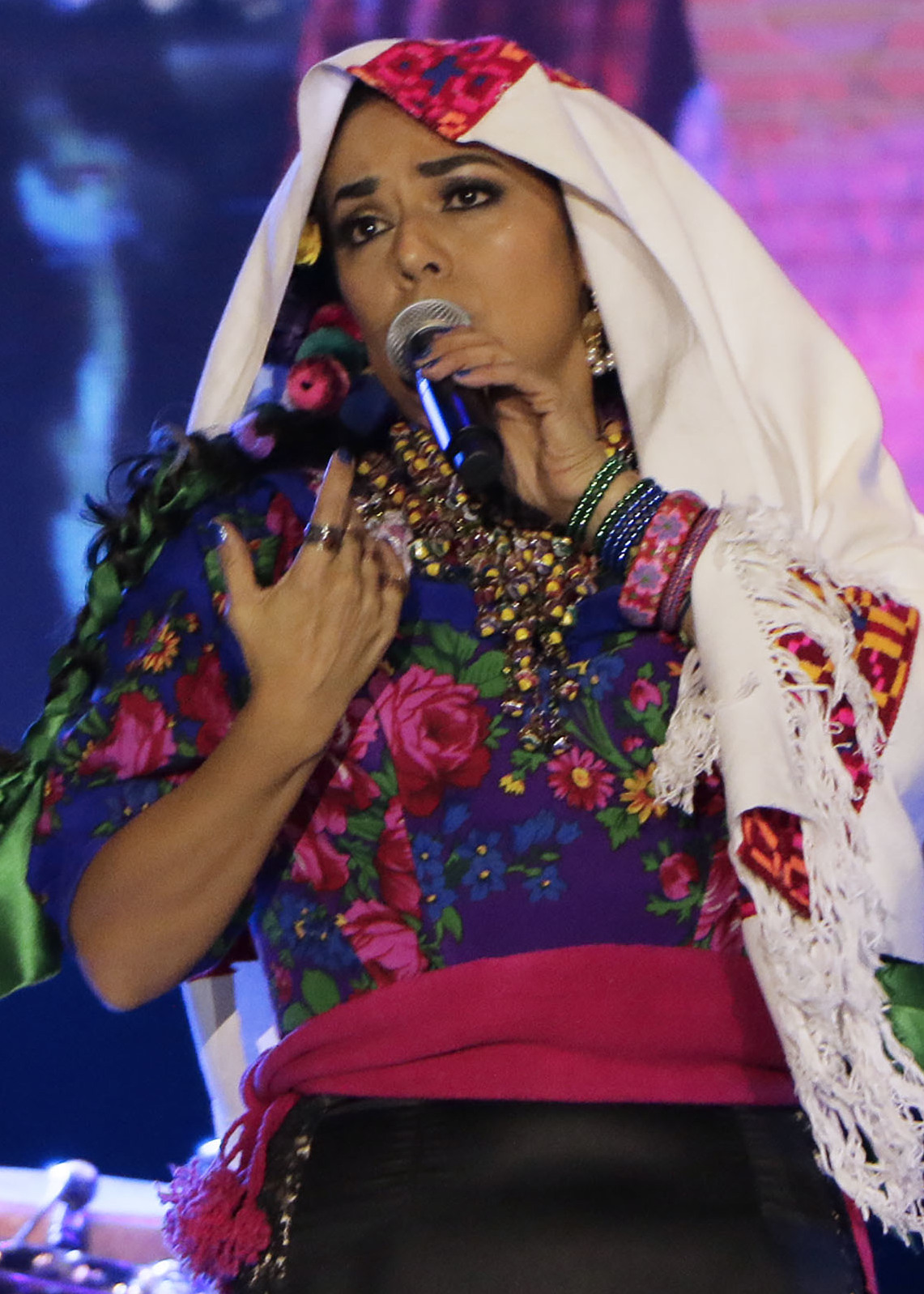
- Downs performing in Mexico (2018)

Background information
- Born: Ana Lila Downs Sánchez; 9 September 1968 (age 58); Tlaxiaco, Oaxaca, Mexico
- Origin: Tlaxiaco, Oaxaca, Mexico
- Genres: Latin; Latin rock
- Instruments: Voice; guitar
- Years active: 1990–present
- Labels: Sony Music; Columbia
- Website: liladowns.com

Ana Lila Downs Sánchez (born 9 September 1968) is a Mexican singer-songwriter, actress, and anthropologist. She performs her own compositions and the works of others in multiple genres, as well as tapping into Mexican traditional and popular music. She also incorporates indigenous Mexican influences and has recorded songs in many indigenous languages such as Mixtec, Zapotec, Mayan, Nahuatl and Purépecha. Born and raised in Oaxaca, she primarily studied at the Institute of Arts by Oaxaca and briefly attended the University of Minnesota, before withdrawing to focus on her musical career. She soon began performing in the traditional music scene of Oaxaca City.

Her first (independent) album, Ofrenda, was released in 1994. In 1999, Downs came to prominence with her debut studio album, La sandunga, which was a critical and commercial success. She achieved international success in 2001 with the album Border which emerged in the music scene of Mexico and Latin America in the early 2000s (decade). Downs's seventh album, Pecados y milagros (2011), topped album charts in most major markets and generated chart-topping world music albums. Her eighth album, "Balas y Chocolate", was released in 2015. "Salón Lágrimas y Deseo", her ninth album, came out in 2017.

Downs began performing in school, demonstrating her vocal ability with traditional music, Latin and American influences, and with her own original twist on dancing. Downs, a native Spanish speaker, also speaks fluent Mixtec and English. Downs through her activism has gone through great lengths to preserve the Mixtec language as well as many other Indigenous Mexican languages.

Influenced by Chavela Vargas, Mercedes Sosa, Lucha Villa, and Amparo Ochoa, Lila Downs is recognized for her diverse contributions to the music industry through her traditional and authentic fashion, the majority of which are based around Mexico's indigenous peoples' styles, cultures and heritages, which show through her performances and music videos. Her achievements include one Grammy Award and three Latin Grammy Awards.

Besides her musical career, she involves herself with humanitarian causes and political activism, especially dealing with issues of Latin America's indigenous population.

== Early life ==
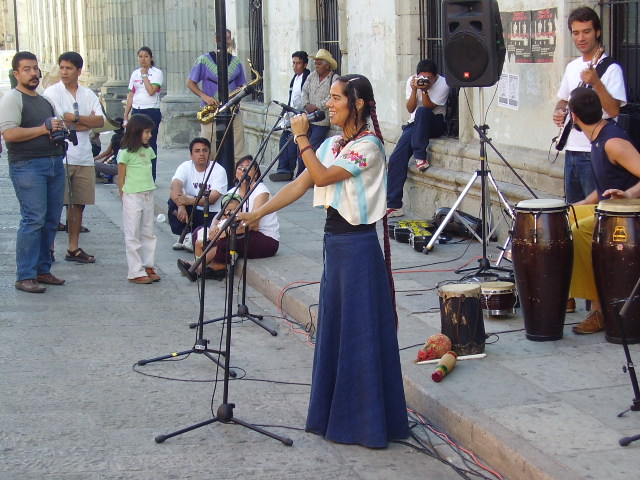
Lila Downs in Oaxaca in 2005

Lila Downs was born on 9 September 1968, in Tlaxiaco, Oaxaca, Mexico. She is the daughter of Anita Sánchez, a Mixtec cabaret singer and Allen Downs, a Scottish-American professor of art and cinematographer from Minnesota. From an early age Downs showed interest in music. At the age of eight she began singing rancheras and other traditional Mexican songs. She began her professional career singing with mariachis. At fourteen she moved to the United States with her parents. She studied voice in Los Angeles and learned English, which her father helped her to perfect. When she was 16, her father died, and she decided to return to her native town Tlaxiaco with her mother.

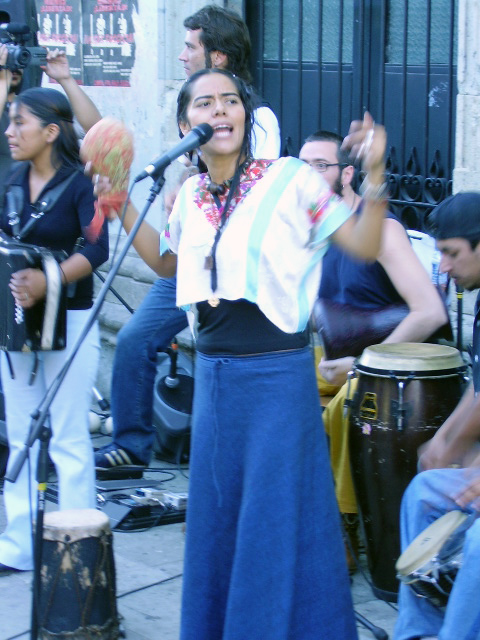
Lila Downs in Oaxaca in 2005

One day while she was working in a store in the Mixtec mountains, a man came in to ask her to translate his son's death certificate. She read that he had drowned trying to cross the border into the United States. This deeply affected her and has continued to her work. She talked about this in an NPR interview about her 2001 release entitled Border.

Although today Downs is proud of her origins there was a time when she felt shame regarding her Indigenous roots. "I was embarrassed to have Indian blood. I was embarrassed that my mother spoke her language in public." This led her on a path to find herself, which included dropping out of college, dyeing her hair blonde and following the band The Grateful Dead. After some time Downs found herself back in Oaxaca, a city in southern Mexico, working at her mother's auto parts store, where she met her future husband and musical collaborator, tenor saxophonist Paul Cohen.

Downs studied Anthropology at the University of Minnesota and voice in New York. Later she attended the Institute of Science and Arts of Oaxaca in Mexico to complete her studies.

At 25, after completing academic and music studies, Downs decided to return to Tlaxiaco. Paul Cohen always encouraged her musical ventures, and she joined a group percussion called Yodoyuxi's Cadets. Because Paul Cohen had business in the United States she began to live in both Minnesota and Oaxaca.

During her stay in Minnesota, Downs formed a group called La Trova Serrana which achieved great popularity among the Latin community within the United States, singing songs about the Zapotec values and culture. Upon her return to Mexico she started singing in bars, restaurants and clubs in the City of Oaxaca, as well as the city of Philadelphia and the state of California, always with the support of US saxophonist Paul Cohen. She received many positive critical reviews, which led to her decision to undertake an extensive tour of Mexico.

== Career ==
=== 1994–1996: First albums ===
In 1994, Lila Downs independently made her first album, entitled Ofrenda. This was both a collection of traditional songs from Oaxaca and Mexico, and songs written by the singer with lyrics sung in Spanish, Mixtec and Zapotec (native languages of Oaxaca). The material was produced both independently and with the support of the Oaxacan Cultures Institute. Because this album was not a commercial success in LP or cassette, she never released a version on CD.

In 1996, Downs recorded a live session at a renowned café-bar of the City of Oaxaca. On this record Downs was accompanied by a set of well-known musicians who supported its interpretation of traditional themes, as well as country music and jazz. With this work Downs and her music became known in different parts of Mexico, and this was her first album to be released on CD. The album had a big impact, despite limited promotion and the fact that only a small number of copies were made. This CD is now out of print, and although not available as part of the official discography of Lila Downs, can be found in digital format.

=== 1997–1999: La Sandunga ===
In 1997, Lila Downs made a second recording, called "Traces", on which she performed material that was to be included in later albums such as La Sandunga, Tree of Life and Border. It is an extensive compilation of items in her traditional repertoire but, like its predecessor, had no commercial distribution, so this disc is also currently out of print.

It was not until 1999, when Downs signed with the label Narada Productions, that she achieved commercial success and made herself known internationally with the album La Sandunga. Recorded a year earlier, this material came to the forefront of Mexican music and her album was one of the first to merge the sounds of traditional music and modern rhythms as jazz, blues and bolero. The album was sung in Spanish and Mixtec, and was produced by Lila Downs and Paul Cohen with the support of Xquenda Cultural Association. Because of this success, Downs participated in the soundtrack of the Mexican film Green Stones and achieved great popularity in countries such as Mexico, United States, Spain, France, England and Germany, selling over 500,000 units worldwide.

=== 1999–2000: Tree of Life/Yutu Tata ===
Downs's next album, Tree of Life, was released in 2000. With this album the fame of Downs continued to spread to other markets in England, Switzerland, Canada and especially the United States. This work found Downs turning to her indigenous past, and the album features pre-Hispanic sounds and instruments. Several of the songs on the album are sung in native Mexican languages such as Mixtec, Zapotec and Nahuatl. In October 2000, she began a two-month tour called the Tree of Life/Árbol de la vida, which included concerts in Latin America, Europe and the US. The tour began in Mexico and ended in Spain.

=== 2001–2003: Border/La Linea (The Line) ===
Border, released by EMI Music in 2001, was the first album by Downs to feature songs sung in English. The album was released simultaneously in the United States and Mexico. With this album Downs merged sounds from different genres such as traditional folk music, hip hop, rock and chilena. It included fifteen songs, eleven in Spanish, three in English and one in Mayan. The album received generally good reviews and placed seventh in the top charts of world music. It also stirred up controversy due to its frank discussion of immigration, Indigenous marginalization and the Acteal massacre. This drew criticism, especially from politicians and the church.

The album's first single was released in Mexico, "Mi corazón me recuerda", a poem by Chiapas poet Jaime Sabines. Set to music, it achieved moderate success on the Mexican music charts. In Spain the song was called "La Llorona", in France the song was called "Corazoncito Tirano" and in the United States the song was called "Medley: Pastures of Plenty/This Land Is Your Land/Land" were released as singles. The latter incorporates two Woody Guthrie songs, "Pastures of Plenty" and "This Land is Your Land" as well as original lyrics by Downs in "Land".

=== 2004–2006: Una Sangre/One Blood ===
One Blood, one of Lila Downs's most successful albums, was released in April 2004, simultaneously in the United States, Spain, and Mexico. The lyrics on this album are about migration, discrimination and the case of Mexican human rights defender Digna Ochoa. In addition to traditional songs such as "La Bamba", "Viborita", and "La Cucaracha", the album includes genres such as son jarocho, jazz, rock and folk. This album contains thirteen tracks, three in English, one in Triqui, one in Purepecha and eight in Spanish. Lyrics were authored by Lila Downs, Paul Cohen, Celso Duarte, and Jose Martí. In 2005 Lila Downs received the Grammy Latino in the category of "Best Album of World Music" for this album and reached the top of the charts in the United States, Mexico, Spain, the United Kingdom, Germany and France.

=== 2006–2008: La Cantina, entre copa y copa ... ===
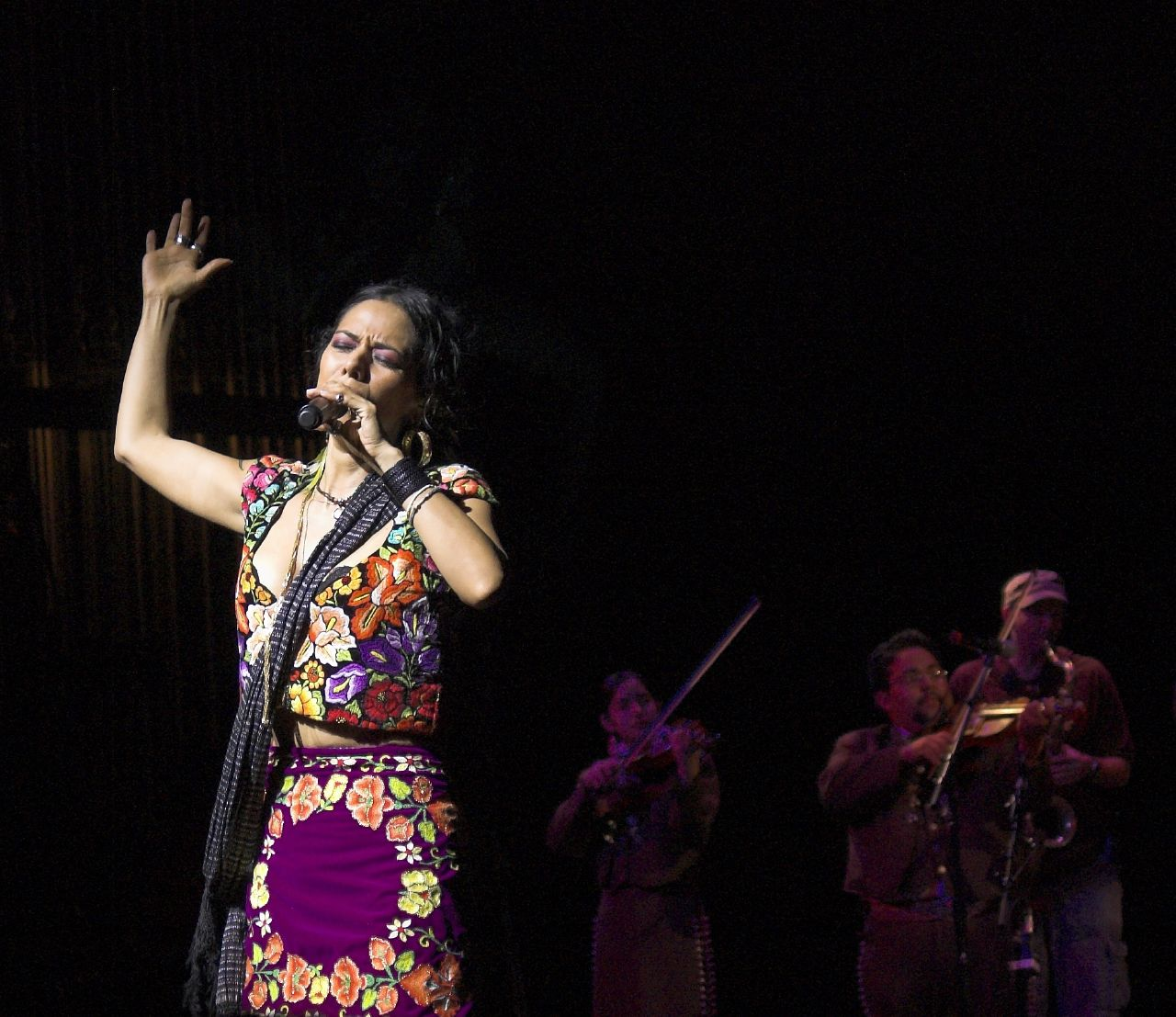
Lila Downs in the "National Sor Juana Festival" 2007.

Lila Downs took approximately one and a half years to prepare this project, which was released in April 2006. This CD draws on Mexican ranchero songs and merges sounds such as pop, rock, norteño, cumbia and hip-hop. This CD contains fifteen tracks, of which twelve are traditional Mexican repertoire authored by Lila Downs, and includes a version in English of "La cumbia del mole", the song that to date is the most well-known work by the artist. "La cumbia del mole" refers to the preparation of Mexican dish and tradition in Oaxaca. This single managed to position itself among the top of the charts in Mexico, United States, Canada and United Kingdom.

In 2007, Downs published a CD with the greatest success in Spanish to date, containing songs from her previous albums La Sandunga, Tree of Life, Border/The Line, One Blood and La Cantina. It was entitled simply The Very Best of Lila Downs and was accompanied with a DVD containing thirteen tracks recorded live at a concert in Madrid, Spain.

=== 2008–2009: Eye of the snake/Ojo de Culebra ===
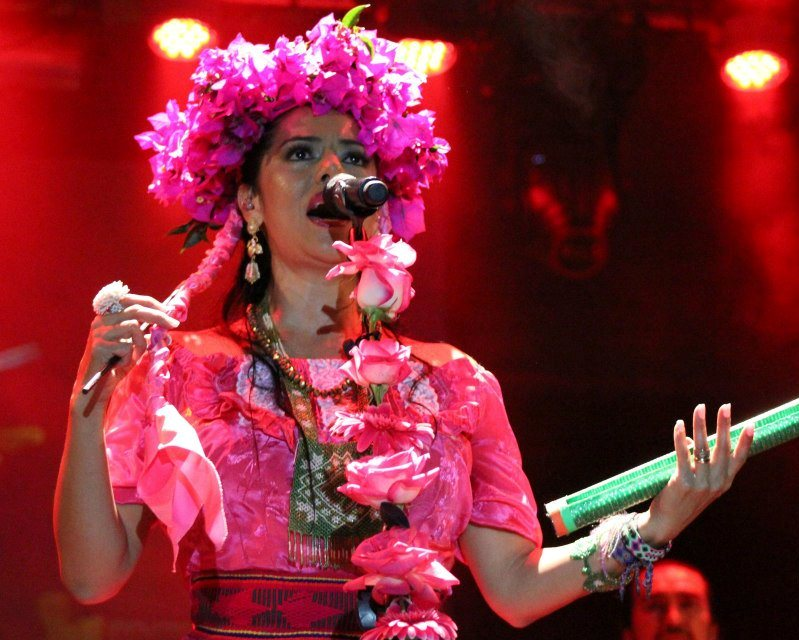
Lila Downs

Two years after the release of La Cantina, in September 2008 Downs launched Ojo de Culebra in Europe, North America, Australia and Latin America. The album reached sixth place in sales in Mexico, Colombia, Argentina, Spain and several Latin American countries. The first single is titled "Ojo de Culebra" was contributed to by the Spanish singer La Mari by group of flamenco Chambao. The song is a merger of rock, cumbia and flamenco with some influences of reggae. This song was at the top of the charts of world music in several countries The second single was "Perro Negro", a merger of rock with ska, (which did not have as much of an international impact as its predecessor), featured Rubén Albarrán singer of the Mexican rock band Café Tacuba. "Little man" (released in the U.S. alone) and "Justice" were her next two singles, the latter with the participation of the Spanish singer Enrique Bunbury. Raul Midon, Gilberto Gutierrez and Mercedes Sosa also contributed to this album.

The single "Black magic woman" achieved moderate success in Europe, United States and Canada, and the single "Silent Thunder" was later well received by the British market. In October 2009 Lila Downs was honored by a plaque at the outskirts of her hometown and birthplace, Tlaxiaco, Mexico, and also was awarded the keys the city for her work preserving the language of Mixtec.

=== 2010–present: Lila Downs y la Misteriosa, Pecados y Milagros ===
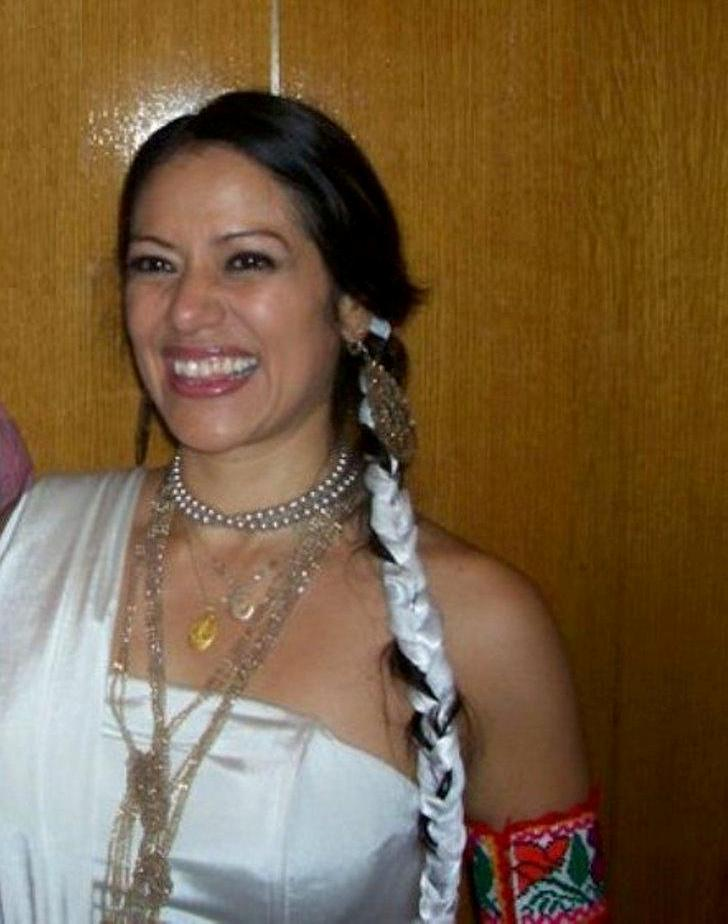
Lila Downs in Istanbul, Turkey in 2010.

Lila Downs y la Misteriosa en Paris – Live à FIP is the second live album by Downs, released on April 13, 2010, in Spain and France, the album was recorded in 2009 in Radio France studio 105 in Paris, France. It was released in May 2010 in the United States and in July in most other countries. It received positive feedback from critics. Lila Downs y la Misteriosa en Paris was released in Mexico with an edited version of the live concert on DVD and was number one in sales of Gender World Music for the music chain Mixup for three consecutive weeks. Although receiving little promotion the album has received moderate success on the Mexican charts. In a survey of the best albums of 2010 conducted by the Mexican television network Channel 22, this album was ranked number one.

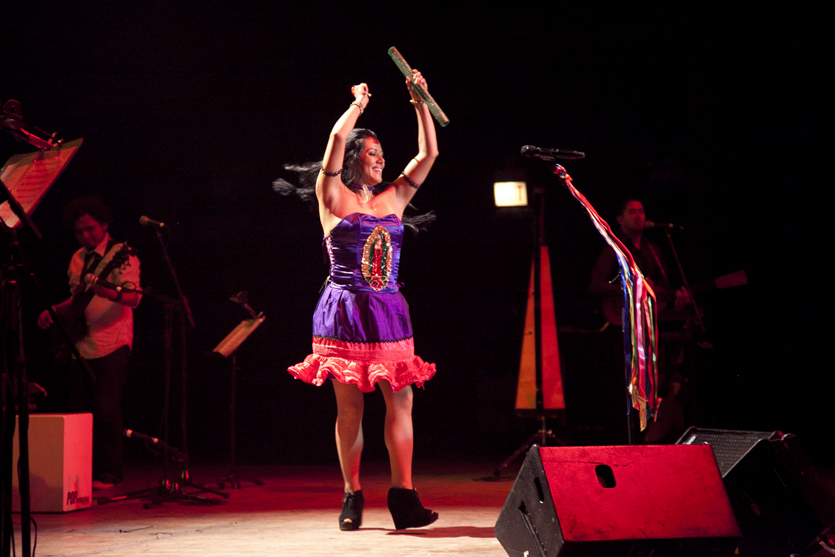
Lila Downs live performing "Palomo del Comalito" in Chicago of 2012.

Pecados y Milagros (Sins and Miracles) was the seventh studio album by Mexican singer-songwriter Lila Downs, released on October 18, 2011. The album cover was released on September 14, 2011.

The album debuted at number fifty two on the Billboard 200 becoming her fourth-highest peak on the chart. It also debuted at number one on the Billboard Top Latin Albums Chart and stayed there for over 3 consecutive weeks. This album has sold over 60.000 copies in the US and over 290.000 copies worldwide. The album was recorded in Mexico City and New York. Downs describes the album musically as having "a strong rock side" along with "traditional" and "Latino" songs. Celso Duarte is one of several collaborators to appear on the album, featuring on the first single "Palomo del comalito".

Other collaborations include songs with rappers Illya Kuryaki and the Valderramas, Celso Piña and Totó la Momposina. Downs has been touring through February 2017 in Mexico, the US and around the world, the Sins and Miracles Tour, which started in Mexico.

Audience members at a concert of February 18, 2012, at New York City El Museo del Barrio were informed that the concert was being recorded by HBO.

In 2014, Soledad released Raíz, a collaborative album featuring Lila Downs and Spanish artist Niña Pastori, and received a nomination for a Grammy Award for Best Latin Pop Album and the Latin Grammy Award for Album of the Year, winning the Latin Grammy for Best Folk Album. The trio also collaborated with Santana on the track Una Noche en Nápoles for the 2014 album Corazón.

In 2015, Lila Downs joined the judging panel for The 14th Annual Independent Music Awards and by doing so, helped to assist the careers of upcoming independent artists.

On May 26, 2017, Downs released Salón, Lágrimas y Deseo, under Sony Music Mexico/Latin. The first single of the album was "Peligrosa", followed over the summer by "Urge". Her next international tour started at the end of March 2017 on the West Coast of the US, followed by a series of performances in Mexico, Europe and Latin America. The album was awarded the Latin Grammy for Best Traditional Pop Vocal at the Latin Grammys in Las Vegas in November 2017.

In August 2021, she collaborated with Guatemalan singer-songwriter Sara Curruchich on the song "Pueblos", which was released on the International Day of the World's Indigenous Peoples.

On June 11, 2026, Downs was among the performers at the opening ceremony of the 2026 FIFA World Cup in Mexico City, which showcased Mexican culture and music prior to the opening match.

== Musical tours ==
=== 2005–2006: One Blood Tour ===
Due to the success of the albums One Blood and Border (2001 and 2004), the One Blood Tour took place and Downs performed 30 international shows on three continents. Countries such as the Philippines, Japan, China, Egypt and Afghanistan were included on the tour, where Downs was well received by the public. In May 2007, Downs published a DVD collection as a document of that tour in a concert in Oaxaca and Mexico City; this DVD contained thirteen live tracks and a documentary as well as special features like interviews, short films by Allen Downs (Lila's father) and videos.

=== 2008–2009: Shake Away Tour ===
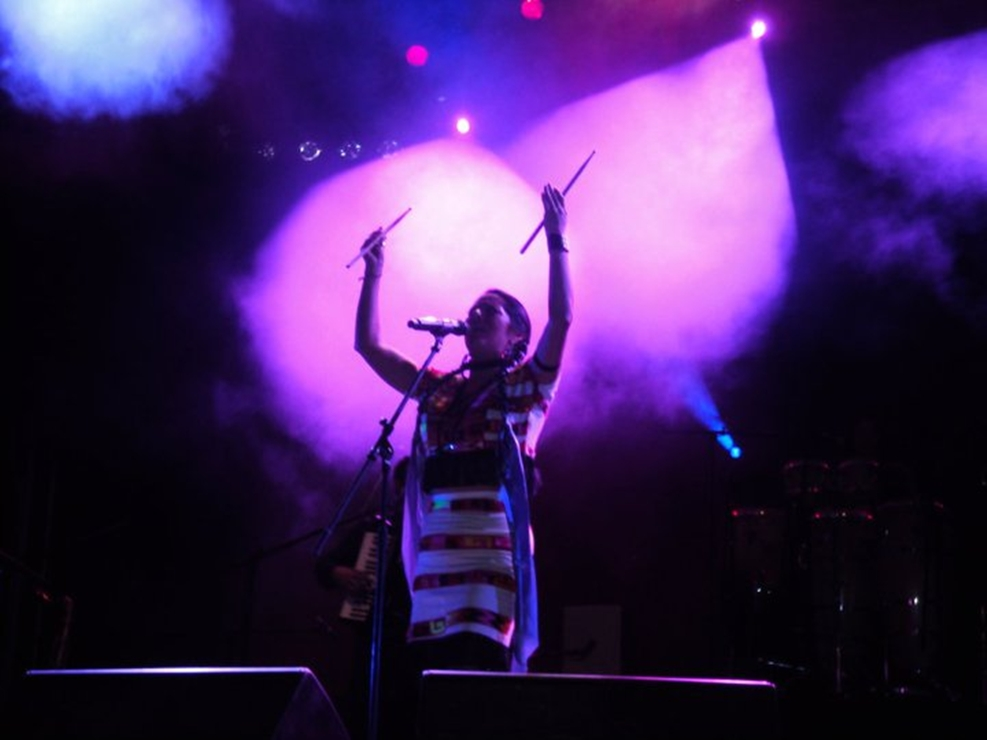
Lila Downs performing during a concert in Oaxaca, Mexico in 2010.

In September 2008, the Ojo de Culebra World Tour started, which took place on four continents, and was the most successful tour for a Mexican artist. In Latin America, Mexico was the country with the highest number of concerts (21 in total), the tour officially ended on October 30, 2009, giving a free concert in the Zocalo of Mexico City, followed by Colombia and Costa Rica, with three concerts each.

Although not part of the tour, Lila Downs appeared in the Live Earth in Germany, where she played three songs, and in late 2008 sang at the Harmony Festival held in California, United States.

=== 2010: Black Magic Woman Tour ===
In March 2010, Lila Downs announced a world tour Black Magic Woman Tour which began in Buenos Aires, Argentina with three sold-out shows. This tour included several countries in America Asia and Europe in many of which attendance records were broken. The tour officially ended on November 17, 2010, in Square Dance by Oaxaca City where she had an audience of approximately seven thousand people.

=== 2011–2014: Pecados y Milagros World Tour ===
Pecados y Milagros World Tour was Lila Downs' fourth musical tour in support of her seventh studio album, " Pecados y Milagros ", also her first album to win Grammy Awards, Latin Grammy Award for best folk album, and best Regional/Mexican Tejano album It was announced on October 3, 2011, through the official website of the singer. Lila Downs explains her meaning behind Pecados y Milagros, also known as "Sins and Miracles" talking about the drug-related violence involved in Mexico's cities. https://theworld.org/stories/2013/08/14/what-mexican-singer-lila-downs-pecados-y-milagros-says-about-drug-violence

=== 2015–2017: Balas y Chocolate World Tour ===
Balas y Chocolate World Tour is Lila Downs's fifth concert tour, and promoted her eighth studio album Balas y Chocolate ("Bullets and chocolate" in Spanish) It began on March 26 in Mexico City at the Plaza Condesa, presenting the repertoire of new music album of the same name tour. Canada in 2015, Spain has toured with great success (Cartagena, Barcelona, Valencia, Madrid etc. ), Paraguay, Chile, Argentina (Mendoza, Buenos Aires, Cordoba ), Bolivia, Ecuador, United States ( more than 20 cities, including New York City, Miami, Hollywood, Los Angeles, Step etc.) In 2016 she will be in London, Spain, Argentina and Peru. In August 2016, Lila Downs performed at the 21st Annual Santa Barbara Mariachi Festival alongside Aida Cuevas, Mariachi Sol de Mexico, Mariachi Nuevo Tecalitlán, and Mariachi Reyna de Los Angeles in Santa Barbara, CA.

=== 2019–2021: Al Chile Tour ===
Al Chile World Tour is Downs' sixth world tour. It was to see concerts in Mexico, the United States, Spain, Colombia and Chile for 2019 and 2020. However, due to the coronavirus pandemic, Downs was forced to cancel or postpone most of the concerts until 2021.

=== 2022 ===
On July 4, 2022, Lila Downs performed in Geneva, Switzerland at the festival Musiques en été.

=== 2023 : European Tour ===
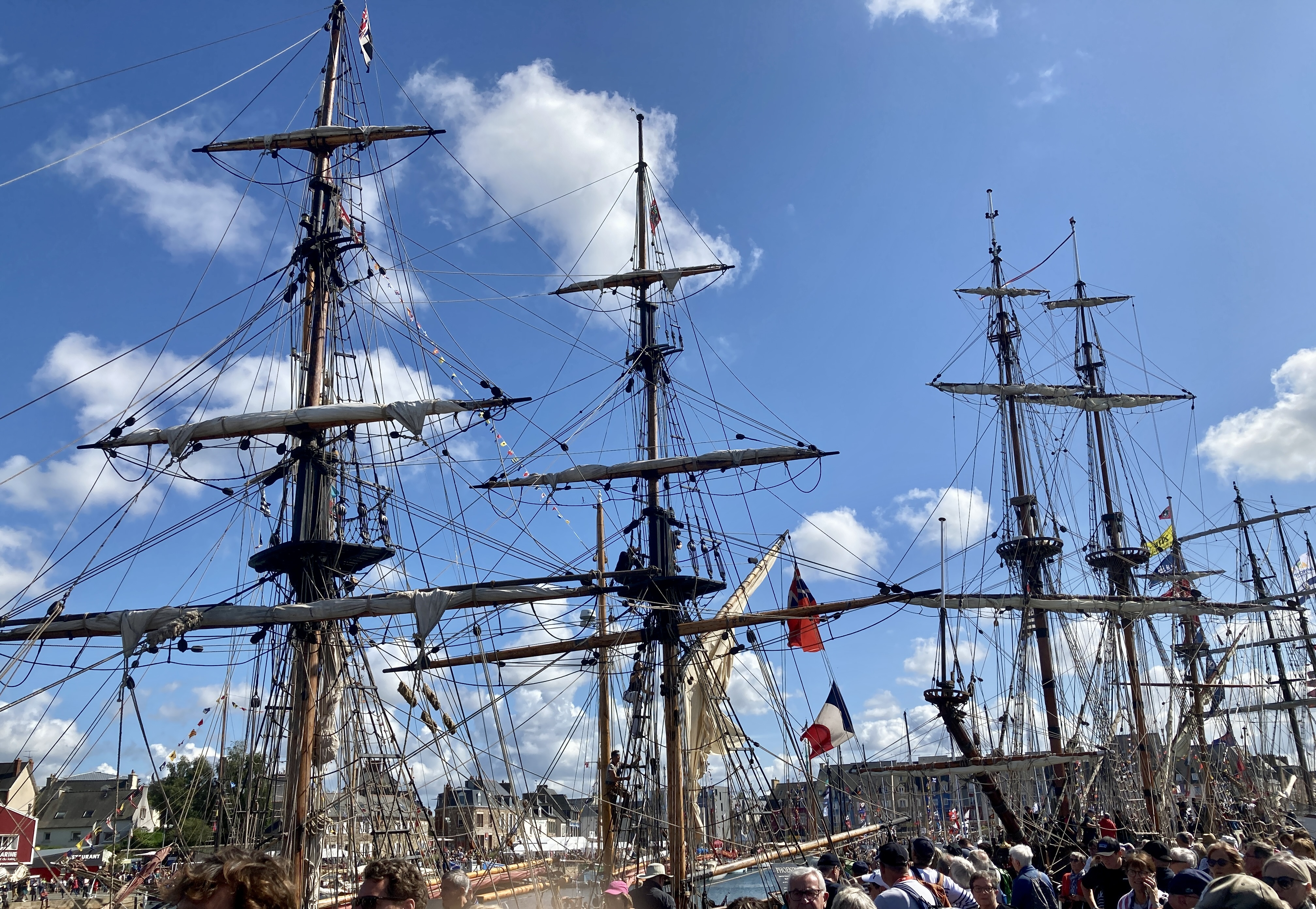

On 5 August 2023, Downs and her band gave a concert at the Festival "Chant de Marins" (Songs of Sailors) in the port of Paimpol, Brittany, France in front of 45.000 people.

== Acting ==
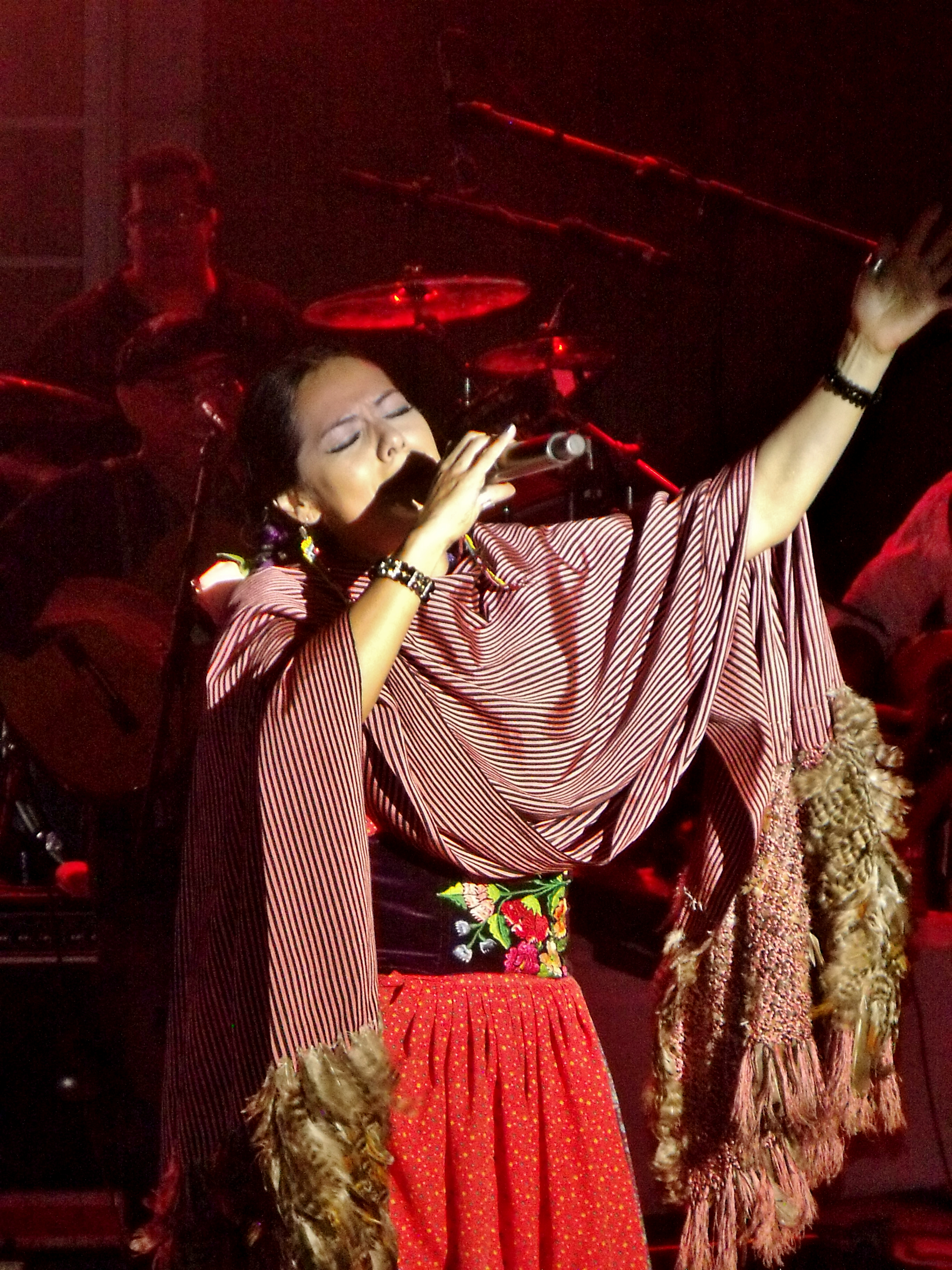
Lila Downs singing

Downs has had small parts in such films as Frida, Fados and Hasta el último trago corazón; the latter is a documentary on Mexican music involving various exponents of the genre. Downs worked on the composition and arrangements for the musical Como agua para chocolate, based on the book by Laura Esquivel, which premiered at the Public Theater of New York and Broadway in late 2011 and early 2012. She participated in the filming of the U.S. film Mariachi Gringo directed by Tom Gustafson, where she worked alongside Mexican actresses Adriana Barraza, Martha Higareda and Canadian actor Shawn Ashmore. The film was released in 2012. She also played Nana Petra in the 2020 animated film Xico's Journey.

=== Soundtracks ===
In 2001, Downs was invited to participate in the soundtrack of the Mexican film Piedras Verdes where she performed "Cancion mixteca", in 2002 she participated in the soundtrack for the film Frida singing the song "Burn It Blue" which was nominated in the 75th Academy Awards in the category of Best Original Song. In 2005 she participated in the soundtrack for the film The Three Burials of Melquiades Estrada with the song "Dónde estás papá". Downs has also participated in other soundtracks for films such as Real Women Have Curves and Tortilla Soup. In the film by Carlos Saura, Fados (2007), she sings an unforgettable version of "Foi na Travessa da Palha" in Portuguese.

== Personal life ==
Since the beginning of her career she was involved with Paul Cohen, who was both her partner and artistic director. In June 2010, Downs announced that after several years of trying to become pregnant, she and Cohen had adopted a child, Benito Dxuladi. They lived in Coyoacán in Mexico City and Oaxaca, although they spent most of the time traveling.

In December 2022, Downs announced on her social media that Cohen had died from heart disease at the age of 69.

== Social activism ==
Downs has been a social activist throughout her entire career and works to maintain her cultural identity and her roots in the eye of social distress. For example, she sings with passion, and admiration for her home in Oaxaca, Mexico. Her music draws out many socially significant issues particularly with issues pertaining to the Indigenous, such as the mistreatment and misunderstanding of indigenous peoples of Oaxaca, by celebrating her Mixtec heritage through song. Her albums are socially significant, especially her album, One Blood, or Una Sangre, which includes songs such as "Dignificada", which is a song about Digna Ochoa's assassination. Digna Ochoa was a lawyer and social activist, and Downs featured her story on her album One Blood.

When asked if she is a politician, Downs said that she does not want to be a politician because she is not interested in power, instead she wants to support and change society through music. On October 9, 2009, Downs, along with actress Salma Hayek represented Mexico in an event for the worldwide campaign of the One Drop foundation, to preserve water. They performed together with the founder of Cirque du Soleil, Shakira, U2, former Vice President Al Gore and other "world-class" personalities.

== Contributions ==
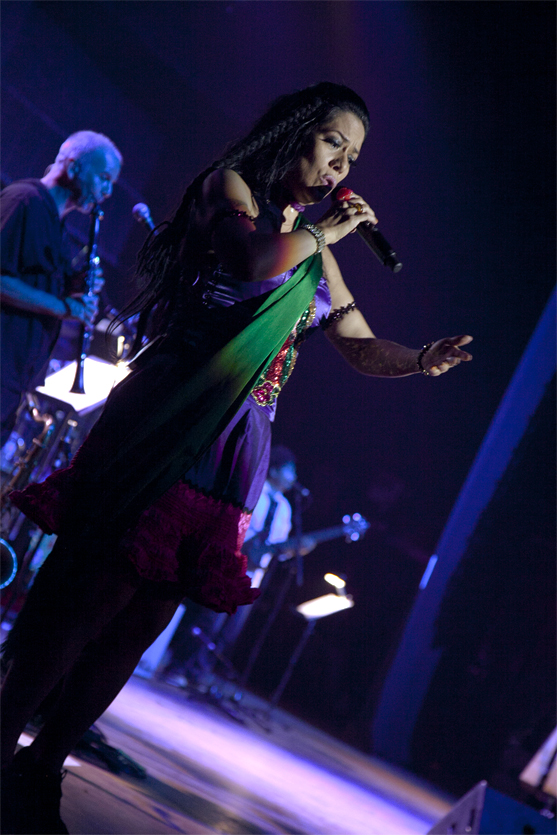
Lila Downs in 2012 in Chicago

- In 2003 she was invited to the Twelve Girls Band concert in Shanghai, China, where she sang in French, Italian and English: Habanera from the opera Carmen, "Signore, ascolta!" from the opera Turandot, Summertime from Porgy and Bess and Ode to joy With Tim Sheff. She also participated on the album "Spain in my heart: Songs of the Spanish Civil War" with the song "El quinto regimiento".
- In 2004 she collaborated with the Afghan singer Kulsoom Syed Ghulam on the album Lullabies from the Axis of Evil on the song "Lalolalo (Don't you Worry My Child)".
- In 2005 she collaborated with the Galician band Luar Na Lubre on the album Saudade on the song "Domingo Ferreiro" performed in Galician.
- In 2006 she collaborated on the Brian Lynch and Eddie Palmieri album Simpático on the song "Que sería la vida" with Brian Lynch.
- In 2007 she collaborated with the Argentinean band Los Calzones Rotos on the album Tanguito on the song "Loco". She also collaborated on the album "Homenaje a Pedro Infante: 50 aniversario" with the song "Amorcito corazón". And she collaborated with the Paraguayan musician Celso Duarte on the album "De sur a sur/From south to south" on the song "Petenera".
- In 2008, on the Los Cojolites album No Tiene Fin, she sang on the song "La Herlinda" and "El Pescador" of the album Sin Fecha de Caducidad by the Mexican singer Celso Piña. She also participated on the album "Songs of the siren: Irresistible voices" with the song "La cumbia del mole". She participated on the album "¡Nueva York!" from the American musician Dan Zanes with the song "La bruja".
- In 2009 she participated on the album of Basque singer Kepa Junkera, where she performs "Haurtxo Polita" in Euskara. She also sang "Razon de Vivir" on Mercedes Sosa's album Cantora, Vol. 2. That same year she also worked on the song "El Llorar" on Mexican musician Ernesto Anaya's album, Huapangueando. She equally participated on the album What About Me? from the UK duo 1 Giant Leap with the songs "Come to the edges" with Huun Huur Tu and "Solita sin soledad" with Carlos Santana. She participated on the album "Sweetheart: our favorite artists sing their favorite love songs" in the song "My One and Only Love". Also collaborated with the Brazilian musician Guilherme Monteiro on the album "Air" on the song "Retrato de un forró", and participated on the posthumous album "Duetos" from the Spanish singer Rocío Durcal on the song "Amor eterno".
- In 2010, Lila Downs sang a duet with the Mexican singer-songwriter Benny Ibarra ("Calaveras"), on his album The March of the Living. The song was the second single for the album. She also sang "Historia de un amor" on Roberto Alagna's album "Pasión". She sang a duet "Vámonos" with the Mexican singer Chavela Vargas on her album "¡Por mi culpa! Chavela Vargas y sus amigos". She also collaborated with the Irish band The Chieftains on the album "San Patricio" on the song "La iguana" with The Chieftains and Ry Cooder.
- In 2012 she collaborated on Kevin Johansen's album Bi with the song "Baja a la tierra", and on the album "Mujer Divina" from the Mexican singer Natalia Lafourcade on the song "La fugitiva"
- In 2013 she collaborated on the album "Ciudadana del mundo vol. 1" on the songs "De que te cuidas" and "Latinoamerica" with Eugenia León, Moyenei, Betsy Pecanins, Tania Libertad and Cecilia Toussaint. She collaborated with the Mexican singer Leonel García on the album "Todas mías" on the song "Sirena". She also collaborated with the Mexican group Los Ángeles azules on the album "Como te voy a olvidar" on the song "El listón de tu pelo". She collaborated with the Spanish band Chambao on the album "10 años around the world" on the song "Papeles mojados". She participated on the album "Grandes éxitos de las sonoras, con la más grande, La Sonora Santanera" from the Mexican band La Sonora Santanera on the song "Tu voz".

== Awards and recognition ==
Throughout her career Downs has received several awards, including a Grammy, 5 Latin Grammys and Lunas del Auditorio. She has recently unveiled her star on the Walk of Fame located in the outskirts of Auditorio Nacional in Mexico City for her career. Her last album 'Balas y Chocolate' was listed on iTunes as one of the year's best in World Music 2015, was one of the UK Sunday Times best albums of the year and was a Best Album of the Year pick in Songlines Magazine, where she was featured on the cover of the June 2016 issue. Some of her most successful songs include: "Tengo miedo de quererte", "Estrella oscura", "La línea", "La llorona", "La cumbia del mole" y "Ojo de culebra". In November, 2017 Lila's latest album; "Salón Lágrimas y Deseo" won Best Album Pop Traditional at the Latin Grammys in Las Vegas. She was presented with the Leading Ladies of Entertainment accolade by the Latin Recording Academy in 2019.

== Discography ==
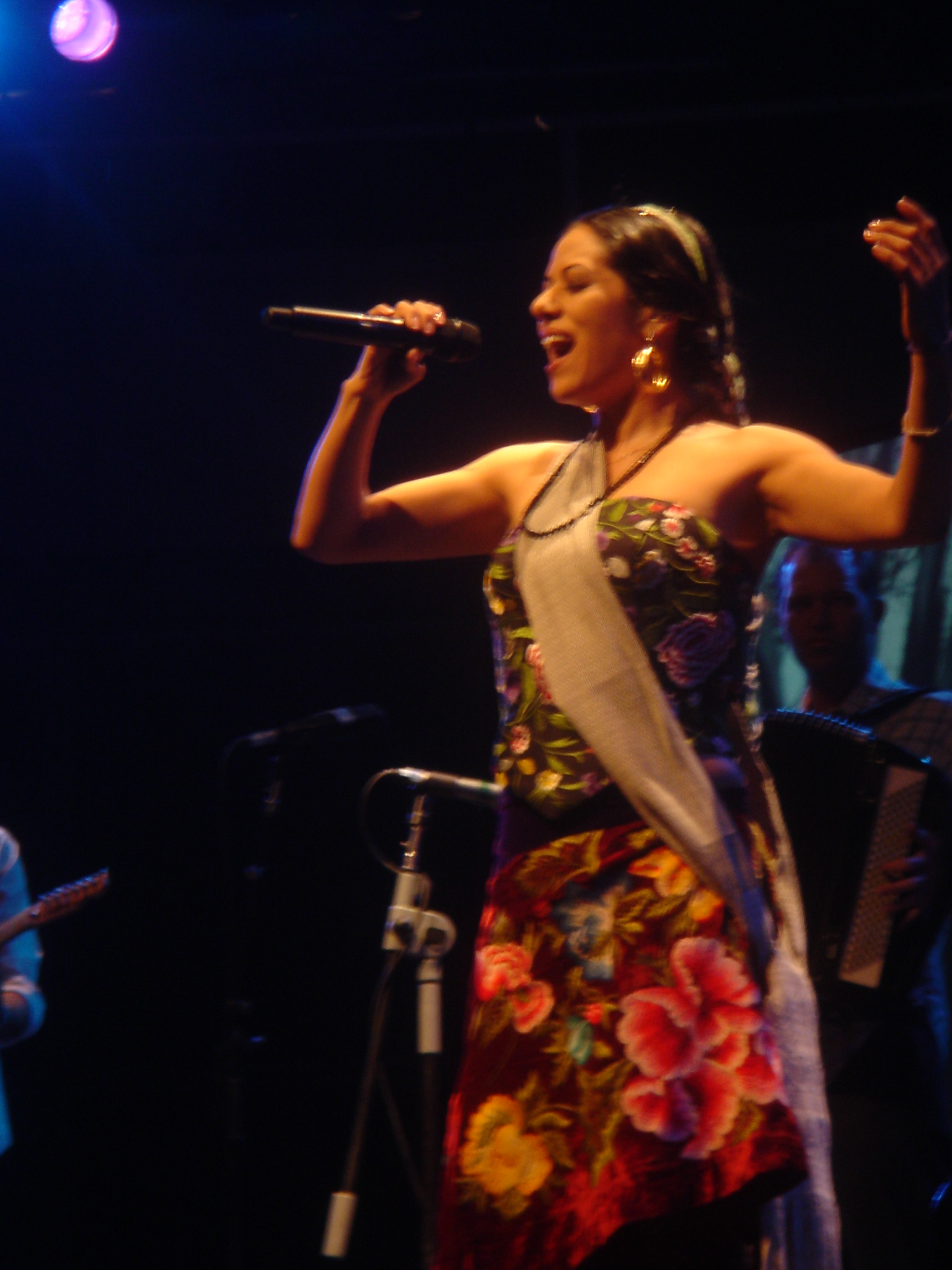
Lila Downs, June 2007. Luminato - Masters of World Music.

=== Albums ===
- Ofrenda (1994)
- Azulao: En vivo con Lila Downs (1996)
- Trazos (1998)
- La Sandunga (Narada 1999)
- Tree of Life (Yutu tata) (Narada 2000)
- Border (La Línea) (Narada 2001)
- One Blood (Una sangre) (Narada 2004)
- La Cantina "Entre copa y copa..." (Narada 2006)
- The Very Best Of/El Alma de Lila Downs [CD] (EMI 2008)
- Shake Away (Ojo de Culebra) (Manhattan Records 2008)
- Lila Downs y La Misteriosa en Paris – Live a FIP [CD (Harmonia Mundi-Global Village Europe/US; various labels worldwide), (CD + DVD EMI Mexico) (2010)]
- Pecados y Milagros (2011)
- Balas y Chocolate (2015)
- Salón, Lágrimas y Deseo (2017)
- Al Chile (2019)
- La Sánchez (2023)
- Cambias Mi Mundo (2026)

With the Brian Lynch/Eddie Palmieri Project

- Simpático (artistShare, 2007)

with Niña Pastori and Soledad Pastorutti

- Raíz (2014)

=== DVD ===
- Lotería Cantada (2006)
- The Very Best Of/El Alma de Lila Downs [CD+DVD] (EMI 2008)

== See also ==
- List of Mexican actresses
