= Pecadora =

Pecadora may refer to:

- "Pecadora" (song), a song by Lila Downs
- Pecadora (film), a 1956 Argentine film
- Pecadora (TV series), a Venezuelan telenovela
