= Balas y Chocolate World Tour =

2015–16 concert tour by Lila Downs

- Tour by Lila Downs
- Associated album: Balas y Chocolate
- Start date: September 9, 2015
- End date: March 20, 2016

Lila Downs concert chronology
- Pecados y Milagros World Tour (2012); Balas y Chocolate World Tour (2015–16); ...

Balas y Chocolate World Tour was the fifth concert tour of the Mexican singer Lila Downs in support of her eighth studio album, Balas y Chocolate (2015).

Lila Downs Album Balas y Chocolate recently premiered, in the year 2015. This album is very personal and full of tradition, which is the winner of the Grammy UN I returned paragraph denounce the violence and corruption of Country do, like explores related to personal tragedies topics, feeding in the ways of the Day of the Dead. The First Bullet is simple and Chocolate "Patria Madrina" That motivates us to fight passionately one defender Our Land Our Nation and Our screens come when one through the UN Cuyo luxury short film shooting took place in Mexico. These ideas were reflected in their participation in the International Festival of Arts & Ideas in New Haven.

Within the tour, Lila Downs was recognized by the DePaul University in Chicago.

The tour ends in November 2016 with two presentations in Mexico City.

== Tour dates ==
Dates	City	Country	Venue
North America
March 26, 2015	Mexico City	Mexico	El Plaza Condesa
March 28, 2015	Xilitla	Mexico	Plaza Principal
April 6, 2015	Ixmiquilpan	Mexico	Plaza Principal
April 12, 2015	Austin	United States	Long Center for the Performing Arts
April 14, 2015	San Luis Obispo	United States	Performing Arts Center San Luis Obispo
April 17, 2015	San Diego	United States	Copley Symphony Hall
April 18, 2015	Rohnert Park	United States	Weill Hall
April 21, 2015	Modesto	United States	Gallo Center for the Arts
April 22, 2015	San Francisco	United States	Nourse Theatre
April 24, 2015	Calgary	Canada	Jack Singer Concert Hall
April 26, 2015	Vancouver	Canada	Chan Centre for the Performing Arts
April 28, 2015	Seattle	United States	Neptune Theatre
May 1, 2015	Washington, D.C.	United States	Lisner Auditorium
May 2, 2015	Durham	United States	Carolina Theatre
May 6, 2015	Chicago	United States	Auditorium Theatre
May 29, 2015	Tehuantepec	Mexico	Explanada Municipal
June 25, 2015	Toronto	Canada	Nathan Phillips Square
Europe
July 18, 2015	Cartagena	Spain	Auditorio Parque Torres
July 20, 2015	Madrid	Spain	Real Jardín Botánico Alfonso XIII
July 21, 2015	Valladolid	Spain	Estival UVa-Campus de Valladolid
July 23, 2015	Valencia	Spain	RealRent Jardines de Viveros
July 24, 2015	Barcelona	Spain	Teatre Barts
July 25, 2015	Huesca	Spain	Auditorio Natural Lanuza
July 27, 2015	Santiago de Compostela	Spain	Plaza de la Quintana
July 29, 2015	Seville	Spain	El Verano de Malandar
July 30, 2015	Málaga	Spain	Teatro Cervantes
August 1, 2015	Pamplona	Spain	Zentral Pamplona
South America
August 8, 2015	Quito	Ecuador	Teatro Villa de las Artes
August 14, 2015	Rosario	Argentina	Teatro El Círculo
August 15, 2015	Córdoba	Argentina	Quality Espacio
August 17, 2015	Mendoza	Argentina	Auditorio Ángel Bustelo
August 19, 2015	Santiago	Chile	Teatro Nescafé de las Artes
August 21, 2015	Buenos Aires	Argentina	Teatro Gran Rex
August 22, 2015	Buenos Aires	Argentina	Teatro Gran Rex
August 27, 2015	La Paz	Bolivia	Teatro al Aire Libre Eduardo Laredo
August 29, 2015	Montevideo	Uruguay	Auditorio Nacional del Sodre Dra
North America
September 5, 2015	Monterrey	Mexico	Auditorio Banamex
September 9, 2015	Dallas	United States	House of Blues
September 10, 2015	Houston	United States	House of Blues
September 19, 2015	Los Angeles	United States	Pantages Theatre
September 22, 2015	Tucson	United States	Fox Tucson Theatre
September 24, 2015	El Paso	United States	Plaza Theatre Performing Arts Center
October 1, 2015	New York City	United States	Apollo Theater
October 5, 2015	Miami Beach	United States	The Fillmore Miami Beach
October 25, 2015	Costa Mesa	United States	Segerstrom Center for the Arts
October 30, 2015	Guadalajara	Mexico	Diana Theatre
November 1, 2015	Mexico City	Mexico	National Auditorium
November 7, 2015	San Francisco	United States	Davies Symphony Hall*
November 7, 2015	San Francisco	United States	Davies Symphony Hall*
November 13, 2015	Puebla City	Mexico	Complejo Cultural Universitario
December 5, 2015	San José del Cabo	Mexico	Festival Sabor a Cabo
January 20, 2016	León	Mexico	Foro del Lago, Feria de León
South America
March 7, 2016	Salta	Argentina	Teatro Provincial de Salta
March 9, 2016	Córdoba	Argentina	Espacio Quality
March 11, 2016	Buenos Aires	Argentina	Teatro Gran Rex
March 15, 2016	Lima	Peru	Gran Teatro Nacional del Perú
Europe
May 20, 2016	Barcelona	Spain	Barts – Banc Sabadell 17è Festival Mil·lenni
May 22, 2016	Gijón	Spain	Teatro Jovellanos
May 26, 2016	Cádiz	Spain	Gran Teatro Falla
June 1, 2016	London	United Kingdom	Royal Festival Hall
