= Shake Away =

Studio album by Lila Downs
- Released: September 2, 2008
- Genres: Latin pop, world music, rock, alternative
- Length: 60:14
- Language: Spanish/english
- Label: Manhattan Records
- Producers: Brian Lynch; Celso Duarte; Aneiro Taño; (exec.): Lila Downs; Paul Cohen

Lila Downs chronology
The Very Best of Lila Downs (2007)	Shake Away (2008)	Lila Downs y La Misteriosa en Paris - Live à FIP (2010)

Singles from Shake Away
- 1. "Ojo de Culebra (Feat. La Mari)" Released: 2 September 2008; 2. "Perro Negro (Feat. Ixaya Mazatzin Tleytól)" Released: 2008; 3. "Yo Envidio en Viento" Released: 2008; 4. "Black Magic Woman (Feat. Raul Midón)" Released: 2009; 5. "Tierra de Luz (Feat. Mercedes Sosa)" Released: 2009

Shake Away (Spanish: Ojo de Culebra) is the sixth studio album by Mexican singer-songwriter Lila Downs. It was released on 2 September 2008 on Manhattan Records. After attaining international success in 2001 with her first English record, Border, Downs wanted to release a fifth Spanish-English language project as its followup. In the vein of her earlier work, the album is heavily influenced by world music, flamenco and rock. Downs enlisted Paul Cohen as executive producer, also working with Celso Duarte, Brian Lynch and Aneiro Taño.

At its release Shake Away received generally favorable reviews from music critics, who complimented Lila's evolution from her earlier work. The album debuted at number 36 on the US Billboard Top Latin Albums, with first-week sales of 30,000 copies. Internationally, the album topped the charts in Argentina, Germany, Mexico and Spain. Shake Away was nominated at Best Contemporary World Music Album at the 2009 Grammy Awards, and the Top World Music Majors at the WOMEX Awards.

Five singles were released to promote the album. Although its lead single ("Ojo de Culebra") was the only track to reach the US Billboard Hot 100, the follow-up singles "Perro Negro", "Yo Envidio el Viento", "Tierra de Luz" and "Black Magic Woman" enjoyed moderate success on the Hot Latin Songs, World Music Songs and Latin Pop Airplay charts. The projects were promoted with the Ojo de Culebra Tour in 2009 and 2010, which visited the Americas, Asia and Europe.

== Background and composition ==
After achieving international success in 2001 with her first English album, Border, Downs released a Spanish-language record as its follow-up (her first since 1999's La Sandunga). Having co-written nearly sixty songs for the project, she decided to divide the release into two editions and put herself "on the mission of selecting [her] favorite ones" to record. Shake Away contains all Spanish-English language songs and Ojo de Culebra features all Spanish-language tracks. Downs initially said that the second version would have a "completely new repertory of songs", although the completed album included two Spanish translations of songs from the first record. When recording the albums, she worked with previous collaborators Celso Duarte and Aneiro Taño and new partner Brian Lynch. The artwork for both Shake Away album was inspired in the mythological account.

Shake Away is heavily influenced by Latin Folk. The introductory track, "Little Man", incorporates folk music styles in its opening banda styles. "Ojo de Culebra" ("Shake Away") features Spanish singer-songwriter La Mari, and includes elements of Mexican cumbia music, flamenco and reggae. "Minimum Wage" is a Jazz influenced song with rock elements against an alternative background. "Perro Negro" ("Dog Black"), featuring Mexican singer-songwriter Ixaya Mazatzin Tleytól, is a fusion of klezmer and rock.

The five track, "Yo Envidio el Viento" is a translation into Spanish of "I Envy the Wind" by the American singer-songwriter Lucinda Williams and has a ballad feel. "Skeleton" also has influences from rock and traditional music, using simple melodies to emphasize Lila's vocals. "Black Magic Woman", featuring singer-songwriter Raul Midón, is a cover by Peter Green that has rock-folk elements. The disc concludes with an English version of "Yo Envidio el Viento" and "Justicia".

== Track listing ==
Shake Away
No.	Title	Writer(s)	Length
1.	"Little man"	Lila Downs, Paul Cohen	3:47
2.	"Ojo de culebra" (Featuring: La Mari)	Downs, Cohen	4:04
3.	"Minimum wage"	Downs, Cohen	4:08
4.	"Perro negro" (Featuring: Ixaya Mazatzin Tleytótl)	Downs, Cohen	3:02
5.	"Yo envidio el viento"	Lucinda Williams	3:44
6.	"Skeleton"	Downs, Cohen	3:02
7.	"Black magic woman" (Featuring: Raul Midón)	Peter Green	3:12
8.	"I would never"	Paul Buchanan	4:44
9.	"Justicia" (Featuring: Enrique Bunbury)	Downs, Cohen	3:51
10.	"Taco de palabras"	Downs	3:05
11.	"Los pollos" (Featuring: Gilberto Gutiérrez)	Traditional	3:17
12.	"Tierra de luz" (Featuring: Mercedes Sosa)	Downs	3:41
13.	"Silent thunder"	Downs, Cohen	4:44
14.	"Shake away"	Downs, Cohen	3:45
15.	"I envy the wind"	Williams	3:45
16.	"Nothing but the truth"	Downs, Cohen	3:53
