= Palomo del comalito =

Single by Lila Downs

from the album Pecados y milagros
- Released: October 15, 2011
- Genre: World music, cumbia
- Length: 4.08
- Label: Sony Music Latin
- Songwriters: Lila Downs, Paul Cohen
- Producer: Paul Cohen Aneiro Taño

Lila Downs singles chronology
"Calaveras" (2010)	"Palomo del comalito" (2011)	"Zapata se queda" (2012)

"Palomo del Comalito (La Molienda)" is the second official single of Mexican singer-songwriter Lila Downs's third Spanish album Pecados y Milagros. The song was written by Lila Downs and Paul Cohen, and was released on October 15, 2011. Musically, Palomo del Comalito is a cumbia-rock which is a song andean with influences by Latin and pop. Lila Downs recorded the song in September 2011 in Mexico City. It was written by herself along with Paul Cohen and produced by Aneiro Tano and Celso Duarte, in collaboration with Brazilian guitarist Guilherme Monteiro. The letter is inspired by the "grinders" are women who make tortillas in a votive offering of a Oaxacan woman fell ill and was entrusted to the Juquila Virgin, and so he recovered from his evil and is back to make tortillas, as a thank represent their "miracle" in a painting. The song received rave reviews. Ixtli Martínez MVS News said "One of the best tracks on the album is" El Palomo of Comalito "is exactly the kind of song without a doubt goes to the heart, is a mixture of sadness and joy.

== Charts ==
Chart (2011)	Best position
Austria (Ö3 Austria Top 40)	13
Belgium (Ultratop 50 Flanders)	10
Belgium (Ultratop 50 Wallonia)	10
Canada Hot 100 (Billboard)	12
Czech Republic Airplay (ČNS IFPI)	10
France (SNEP)	6
Netherlands (Dutch Top 40)	46
Spain (PROMUSICAE)	10
Switzerland (Schweizer Hitparade)	3
