= Ofrenda (disambiguation) =

An ofrenda is the offering placed in a home altar during the annual and traditionally Mexican Día de Muertos celebration.

Ofrenda may also refer to:

- Ofrenda (Danny Rivera album), 1986
- Ofrenda (Lila Downs album), 1994
