= Ofrenda (Lila Downs album) =

Studio album by Lila Downs
- Released: July 22, 1994
- Recorded: 1994; AT Studio in México City.
- Genre: Latin, world music, traditional
- Length: 32:01
- Language: Spanish, Mixtec, Zapotec
- Label: Sony Music Latin
- Producer: Lila Downs, Paul Cohen, Aneiro Taño

Lila Downs chronology
Ofrenda (1994)	Azulao: En vivo con Lila Downs (1996)

Ofrenda (English: Offering) is the debut album by Mexican singer-songwriter Lila Downs. It was released in 1994. The songs are a collection of traditional songs from Oaxaca, Mexico and songs written by Downs. The songs are sung in Spanish, Mixtec and Zapotec, the latter two being languages native to the State of Oaxaca. Downs recorded this LP independently with the support of Oaxacan Institute of Cultures in 1992 and 1994.

With Ofrenda, Downs became known in some areas of the State of Oaxaca, mostly concentrated in cafes, bars and nightclubs around Oaxaca City. The album was not commercially successful and was widely dismissed. Only about 1000 copies were published in Mexico. It was not heavily promoted; it was promoted only in LP and cassette, and has never been released on CD.

Ofrenda is now discontinued and is no longer part of the official discography of Lila Downs.

== Tracks ==
1. "La Sandunga"
2. "La Llorona"
3. "Yucu Yucu Ninu"
4. "Ofrenda"
5. "Xquenda"
6. "Canción Mixteca"
7. "Dios nunca muere"
8. "Sabor a Mí"
9. "Pobre Changuita"
