= Trazos =

Studio album by Lila Downs
- Released: 1998
- Genres: Jazz, Tradition
- Producers: Indepiendente, Asociación Cultural Xquenda

Lila Downs chronology
Azuláo: En vivo con Lila Downs	Trazos	La Sandunga

Trazos is the second album by Lila Downs. It was released in 1998. The songs are in a jazzy, traditional style.

== Track listing ==
1. "Bésame Mucho" (Consuelo Velázquez)
2. "Quinto patio" (Manuel R. Piña)
3. "Perfume de gardenias" (Rafael Hernández Marín)
4. "La malagueña salerosa" (Elpidio Ramírez/ P. Galindo)
5. "Almendra" (Anon.)
6. "Un poco más" (Álvaro Carrillo)
7. "Arenita azul" (Trad.)
8. "Estrellita " (Anom.)
9. "Arráncame la vida" (María Teresa Lara)
10. "Mambo no. 8" (Dámaso Pérez Prado)
11. "La niña" (Lila Downs)
12. "Sale sobrando" (Lila Downs/Paul Cohen)
13. "Hanal weech (Cumbia maya)" (Rafael Hernández Marín)
