= Balas y Chocolate =

Studio album by Lila Downs
- Released: March 24, 2015
- Recorded: 2014
- Genre: Regional Mexican; latin
- Length: 52:25
- Label: RCA; Live Nation; Sony Music Mexico
- Producer: Paul Cohen; Lila Downs; Aneiro Taño

Lila Downs chronology
Pecados y Milagros (2011)	Balas y Chocolate (2015)

Singles from Balas y Chocolate
- 1. "Patria Madrina" Released: March 23, 2015

Balas y Chocolate ('bullets and chocolate') is the eleventh album by Mexican singer-songwriter Lila Downs. Released on March 24, 2015, by RCA Records. US release on April 14, 2015. After a flurry of unexpected album content leaks, including three early demos in February 2015, the record's release was locked in for March 2015, and the track "Balas y Chocolate" officially released on MTV on February 24, 2015. "Patria Madrina" was designated the album's lead single.

== Background and development ==
Following the release of her seventh studio album, Pecados y Milagros (2011), Downs embarked on the Pecados y Milagros World Tour. The tour visited America, Europe, Asia a number of new venues. In 2012, the singer commented that she was beginning to compose songs for her next album. In May 2014, Downs confirmed that she had started working on her eighth studio album, saying that her next album would be titled Balas de chocolate ('chocolate bullets'). But she refrained from disclosing the official name and collaborators, commenting that it was inspired by the Day of the Dead as it was a very important date to her indigenous grandmother and for remembering the death of her father when she was 16 years old. In June 2014, Downs confirmed that she would begin recording the album the following month. She said she would use it to remember her childhood, which was marked by various musical influences, among them The Rolling Stones and Bob Dylan. Later she released titles of the album and some of its songs. She explained that the name represents the Mexican people living between bullets and excesses, and also uses chocolate as a symbol of the people's strength, similar to the importance of corn in Mayan and Olmec culture.

On March 5, 2015, the album cover was released with information about the collaborations on the record, which include Juanes and Juan Gabriel. "I have invited Juanes like three times ... we've been wanting to work with him for a long time, partly because I am very fond of Colombia, the work of Juanes and his person!". One side of the cover has a lenticular in which, on one side, Downs appears posing in an archaeological center of Oaxaca, and the other side is a skull-shaped drawing by plastics artist Humberto Valdez. Images in the booklet represent each of the songs with strong ties to contemporary Mexican society, and a poster with an image of Lila Downs as a calaca. demos of several songs from the album were broadcast online by the channel Live Nation by Yahoo! Screen during a concert that featured the singer on August 11, 2014, at the House of Blues in Chicago. On February 3, 2015, the song "Humito de Copal" was leaked but removed from the internet hours later. In early March 2015, "Patria Madrina" and "Balas y Chocolate" were released.

== Track list ==
No.	Title	Writer(s)	Length
1.	"Humito de Copal"	Lila Downs/Paul Cohen	3:52
2.	"Mano Negra"	Lila Downs/Paul Cohen	4:32
3.	"Balas y Chocolate"	Lila Downs/Paul Cohen	3:30
4.	"Una Cruz de Madera"	Luis Mendez Almengor	3:09
5.	"La Farsante (feat. Juan Gabriel)"	Alberto Aguilera Valadez	4:17
6.	"La Burra"	Jesus Rosas Marcano	3:18
7.	"Cuando Me Tocas Tú"	Lila Downs/Paul Cohen	4:35
8.	"La Patria Madrina (feat. Juanes)"	Lila Downs/Paul Cohen	4:18
9.	"Las Casas de Madera"	Cirino Paniagua García	4:09
10.	"La Promesa"	Lila Downs/Paul Cohen	5:25
11.	"Son de Difuntos"	Lila Downs/Paul Cohen	3:37
12.	"Dulce Veneno"	Lila Downs/Paul Cohen	3:43
13.	"Viene la Muerte Echando Rasero"	Asunción Aguilar	4:00
