= Paté de Fuá =

Musical group

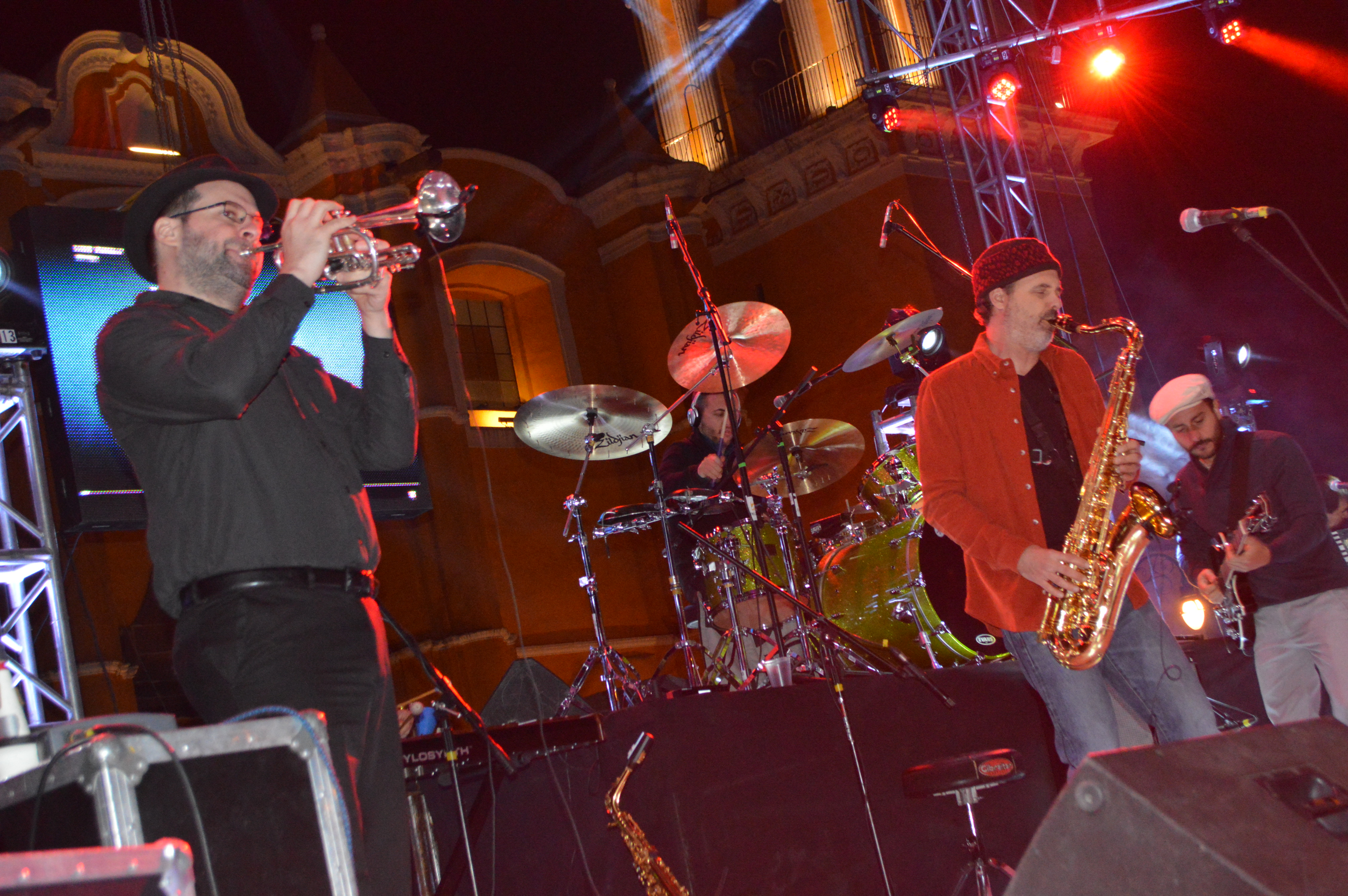
- Paté de Fuá in 2015

Background information
- Origin: Mexico City, Mexico
- Genres: Tarantela; Dixieland; musette; tango; jazz
- Years active: 2005–present
- Labels: Intolerancia; Multimusic; e35; Sony
- Members: Yayo González; Guillermo Perata; Luri Molina; Diego Franco; Dan Mazor; Jorge Servín; Roberto Verastegui
- Website: patedefua.mx

Paté de Fuá is a musical group whose style can be defined as a mixture of tarantella, dixieland, musette, tango and jazz. It is a group born in Mexico City and is integrated by musicians from different countries, currently with members from Mexico, Argentina and Palestine.

== History ==
Paté de Fuá, whose name refers to pâté de foie gras, was formed on April 18, 2006 in Mexico City. The group's leaders Yayo and Guillermo had left their native country due to the December 2001 crisis in Argentina, and upon arriving in Mexico was where they met the other musicians.

They have participated in the Vive Latino festivals in the 2009, 2010, and 2012 editions. They won the Lunas del Auditorio award in 2010 and 2013 in the Jazz and Blues category, and Indie-O Music Awards in 2010, 2011 and 2012.

== Members ==
The group is made up of the following members:

- Yayo González (Argentine), director and composer: guitar and lead vocals.
- Guillermo Perata (Argentine), musical director and composer: banjo, mandolin, trumpet, cornet, cornet (euphonium), accordion and cavaquinho.
- Jorge "Luri" Molina (Mexican): electric bass, double bass, backing vocals.
- Diego Franco (Mexican): saxophone.
- Dan Mazor (Palestine): saxophone and clarinet.
- Jorge Servín (Mexican): drums.
- Roberto Verastegui (Mexican): piano, keyboard, accordion and vibraphone.

Former members:

- Demián Cantilo (Brazilian): drums and lollipop.
- Gabriel Puentes (Chilean): drums.
- Rodrigo Barbosa (Mexican): drums and lollipop.
- Víctor Madariaga (Mexican): accordion and bandoneon.
- Alexis Ruiz (Mexican): vibraphone and marimba.

Guest musicians:

- Mario Patron: Piano and organ
- Rodrigo Garibay: Clarinet and alto saxophone.
- Dan Mazor (official member until 2013): saxophone

== Discography ==
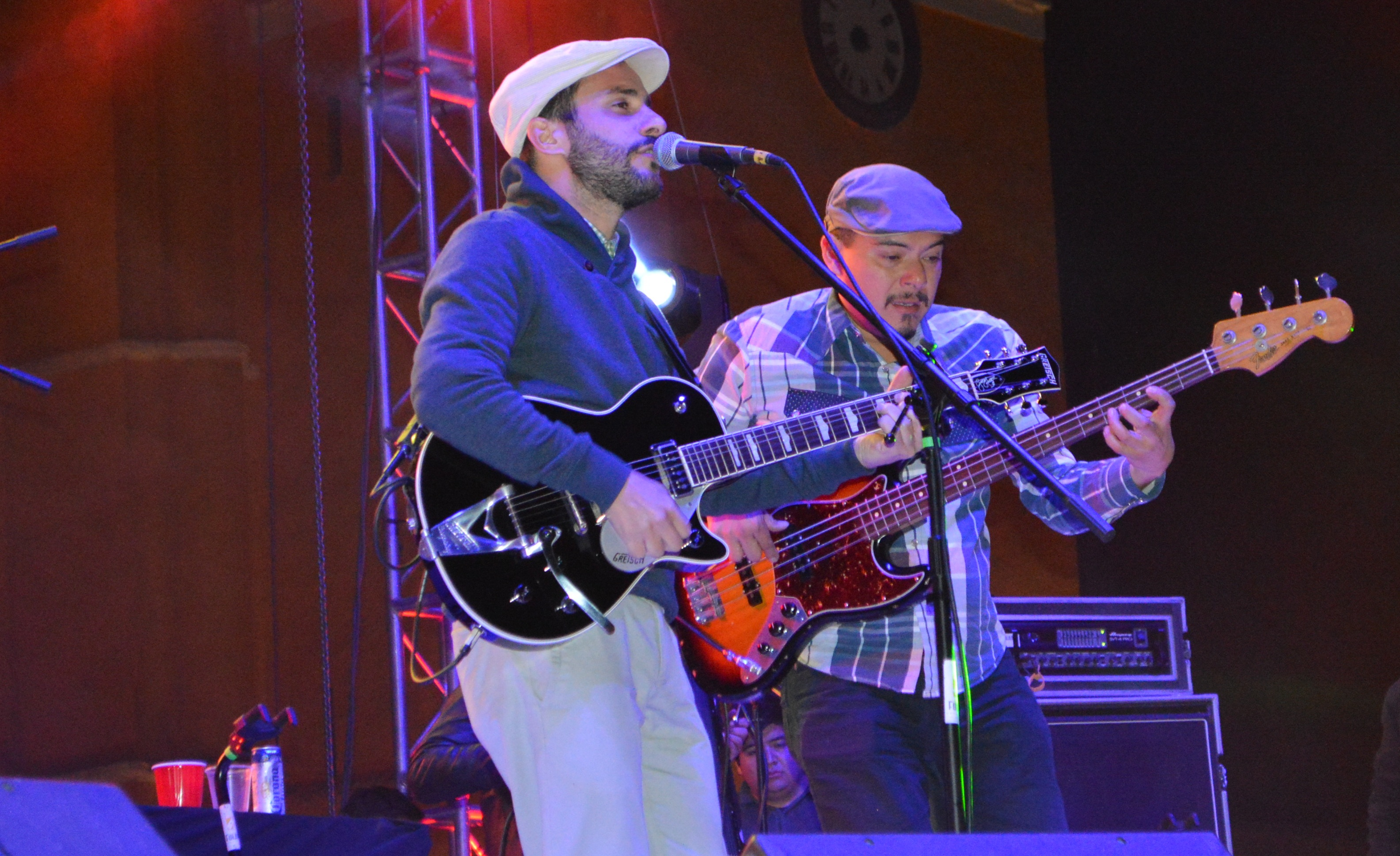
Paté de Fuá in concert in Cholula 2015

=== Studio albums ===
- Música moderna (2007)
- El Tren De La Alegría (2009)
- Boquita Pintada (2011)
- Película Muda Primera Parte (2014)
- Película Muda Segunda Parte (2016)
- Amores Ajenos (2021)

=== Live ===
- Yo Estuve Ahí (2010)

=== Compilation albums ===
- Bon Appetit (2012)

== Awards and nominations ==
=== Awards ===
Year	Award	Category
2010	Indie-O Music Awards	Disco Jazz/Funk/Fusión por "El Tren de la Alegría"
2010	Indie-O Music Awards	Premio de la Gente
2010	Lunas del Auditorio	Jazz y Blues
2011	Indie-O Music Awards	Acto En Vivo
2012	Indie-O Music Awards	Disco Jazz/Funk/Fusión por "Boquita Pintada"
2013	Lunas del Auditorio	Jazz y Blues

=== Nominations ===
Year	Award	Category
2010	Indie-O Music Awards	Banda del Año
2011	Lunas del Auditorio	Jazz and Blues
2012	Indie-O Music Awards	Arte Empaque por "Boquita Pintada"
2014	Latin Grammy Awards	Mejor canción de música alternativa por "Vamos A Morir"
