= Lotería Cantada =

Lotería Cantada is a 2006 DVD featuring the Mexican-American singer Lila Downs in a series of concerts held in Mexico City and Oaxaca City, Mexico, in February 2006. The DVD is the result of a collaboration by a number of film makers working with Downs and her band. According to Down's web site, "Images were edited and intervened by nine visual artists: Ivonne Fuentes, Bruno Varela, Alejandro Cantú, Pedro Jiménez, Mario Viveros, Sal V. Ricalde, Fernando Llanos, Johnny Moreno and Elena Pardo." The performances were benefit concerts for the Guadalupe Musalem Scholarship Fund.

The music features original works and traditional Mexican songs that Downs has featured on her recordings. Included are Downs' take on "La Cucaracha" and her reading of the story of "La Llorona". Extra features include an "on the road" video of Downs and her band on tour, and an experimental video done by Downs' father, Allen Downs. Her filmmaker father died when Downs was young so his video features Lila as a toddler with her mother in the Mixteca Alta of Oaxaca.

The DVD features subtitles.

== Track list ==
1. El Pescador
2. Dignificada
3. One Blood
4. Cucaracha
5. Hanal Weech (cumbia Maya)
6. Naila
7. Mother Jones
8. La Iguana
9. Malinche
10. La Llorona
11. Paloma Negra
12. Viborita (Concierto callejero en Oaxaca)

== Extras ==
- "La Cumbia del Mole" ( video clip, directed by Johnny Moreno)
- Love Shots (short film by Allen Downs, Lila father, 1974)
- En el Camino/ On the Road (documentary by Elena Pardo)
- Lila + Pintores de Oaxaca (conversations with Oaxacan painters: Guillermo Olguin, José Luis García y Luis Zárate)
- Lila + Cortometrajes (short films) ...and more.
