= Celso Duarte =

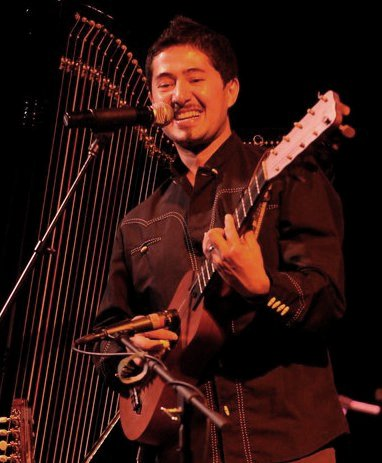
- Duarte on May 1, 2010

Background information
- Born: June 1974 (age 52)
- Origin: Villarrica, Paraguay
- Genres: World, Son Jarocho, Paraguayan folk
- Years active: 1983–present
- Label: Studio Harp
- Website: Celso Duarte page

Celso Duarte (born June 1974, in Villarrica, Paraguay) is a virtuoso of Paraguayan harp and Mexican jarocho harp, arranger, singer, and multi-talented instrumentalist. Duarte has performed and recorded with Lila Downs since 1998 and has also accompanied and collaborated with other artists, including Susana Baca, Celso Piña, Plácido Domingo, Mariza, Ramón Vargas, Julieta Venegas, Wynton Marsalis, The Chieftains and Ry Cooder. As a solo artist, he has performed with his band at Carnegie Hall, Kennedy Center, Joe's Pub and other historic venues. His first solo album, "De Sur a Sur (From South to South)", was released in 2006.

== Early years ==
Duarte was born in Paraguay and raised in Mexico. He is the son of Celso Duarte González, one of Paraguay's leading harpists, and María Elena, a Mexican singer and pianist. His parents met in the 1970s while his father was touring Mexico with a folkloric ensemble.

Duarte was raised in a musical family and started playing music when he was five or six. He later recalled, "My family, they are musicians, too. I started with my brothers, playing like a game." As a youth, he studied violin and classical music at the Universidad Nacional Autónoma de México's prestigious National School of Music. At age 10, he began touring with his family under the name "Los Duarte" in the United States and Japan. In 1984, the family, including mother, father and four children, appeared at the Southwest Museum in Los Angeles, performing instrumental arrangements and four-part harmonies of rare Paraguayan music in traditional costumes. At the time, the Los Angeles Times described the elder Duarte as "one of the foremost interpreters of Paraguayan harp music in the world today," and noted, "Music is a social activity in Paraguay as well as a profession, and Duarte and his family in particular demonstrate how music is integrated into family life."

== Musical career and style ==
Duarte is a virtuoso on the Paraguayan harp and Mexican jarocho harp. In 1998, he met Lila Downs while playing a festival in Oaxaca, Mexico, and since then has gained critical acclaim playing harp and violin in her band, La Misteriosa. Duarte made some of the arrangements and co-wrote the title track for Lila's 2005 Grammy-Award winning album "Una Sangre (One Blood)." He has also accompanied other artists, including Susana Baca, Plácido Domingo, Mariza, Ramón Vargas, Julieta Venegas, Olivia Molina, and Wynton Marsalis. In addition to recording with Lila Downs, he has also performed on albums with Celso Piña, Joe Vasconcelos, Charanga Cakewalk, Sofía Koutsovitis, and with The Chieftains and Ry Cooder on "San Patricio." He also collaborated with Julieta Venegas on the soundtrack to the Academy Award-nominated film "Maria Full of Grace."

In his solo career, Duarte has showcased traditional Paraguayan folk and son jarocho (a musical style from Veracruz, Mexico that draws from indigenous Huastecan, Spanish Baroque, and African influences). In addition, Duarte creates a new style of music by incorporating elements of jazz and world rhythms, including Brazilian and Afro-Peruvian styles. In 2006, Duarte released his first solo album, "De Sur a Sur (From South to South)", featuring his arrangements of son jarocho and Paraguayan folk songs. The United States release of "De Sur a Sur" was held at the Getty Center in Los Angeles. While touring in support of the album, Duarte noted, "We're going to present the son jarocho in our own way, with rhythms from [Peruvian] festejo, Brazilian samba, and also a few harp solos from Paraguay, classics like 'Pájaro Campana' and others." A second solo album is to be released in April 2011.

Duarte has toured with his band, known variously as the Celso Duarte Quartet, the Celso Duarte Sextet, and the Celso Duarte Ensemble, at leading venues in the United States, including 2007 performances at Joe's Pub in New York, Kennedy Center in Washington, D.C., and the Getty Center in Los Angeles, and 2010 performances at Carnegie Hall in New York, and the historic Capitol Theater in Olympia, Washington.

In addition to performing and recording, Duarte also spends time researching folkloric genres that are in danger of being lost. Asked about his harp playing, Duarte said, "My harp is for me a magic instrument. You can feel the resonance in your chest, in your arms, in your body."

== Critical reception ==
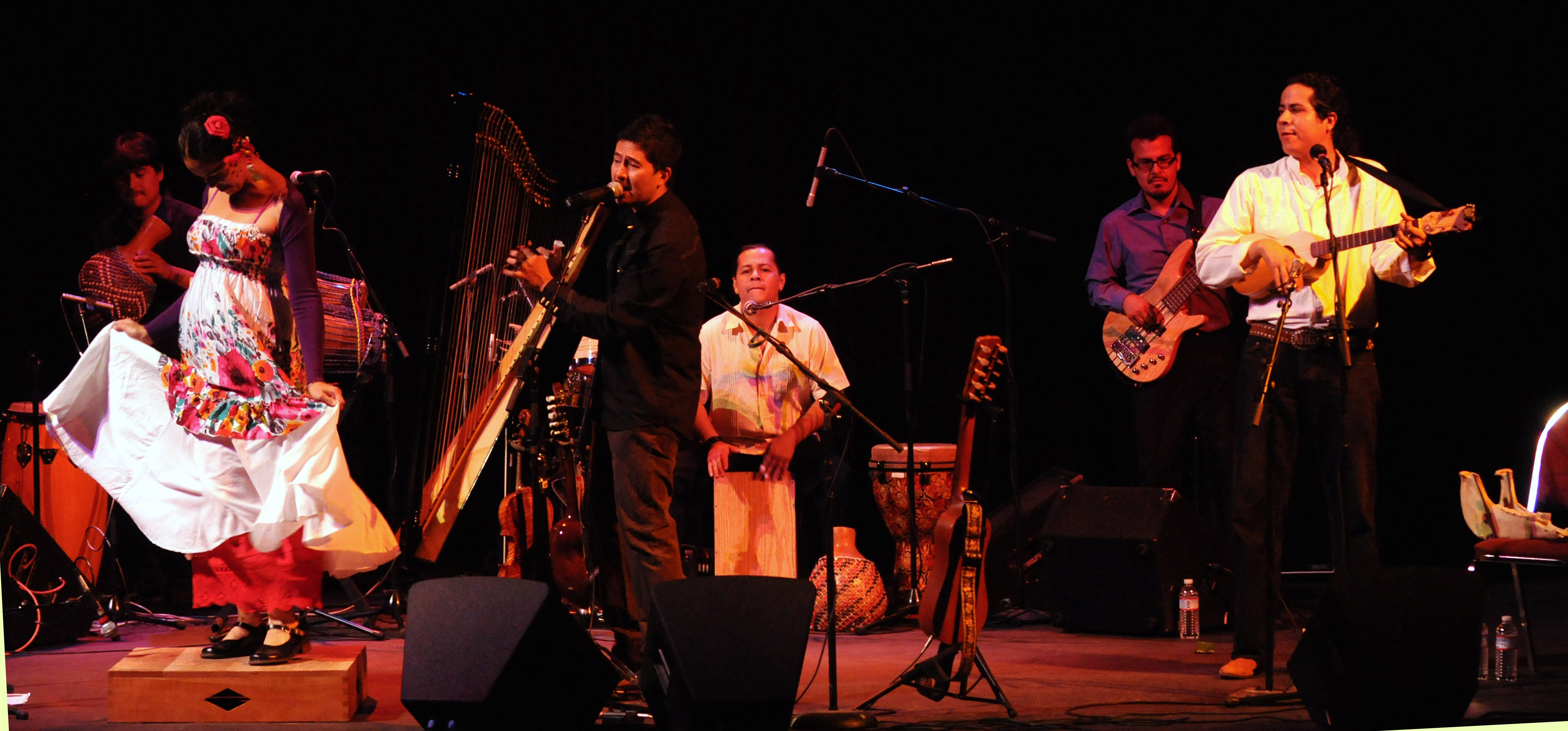
Celso Duarte Sextet in Olympia, Washington, May 2010

Duarte has been acclaimed as a harp virtuoso and one of the leading figures of world music. Critical comments on Duarte include:

- Following a June 2004 concert with Lila Downs at London's Royal Festival Hall, the Evening Standard noted that the show "centred on Celso Duarte's impassioned harp and violin." After the same show, The Guardian of London wrote, "The best songs, by far, were those from Mexico in which she dispensed with keyboards and concentrated instead on her virtuoso harp and violin player, Celso Duarte."
- After the release of his first solo album, Paste magazine wrote: "Duarte’s latest album, De Sur a Sur ('From South to South'), is the modern manifestation of Son Jarocho's characteristic style—amazingly nimble harp lines played at blazing speeds (“Apolonita”) while occasionally backed by traditional female folk singing ('Cascabel'). It’s an intoxicating mixture, and entirely different from other regional folk-music styles better known to North American audiences."
- In announcing his appearance in New York as part of the 2007 Celebrate Mexico Now Festival, Joe's Pub called Duarte "charismatic, talented and deeply profound."
- After a 2007 performance in Washington, D.C., The Washington Post wrote that the "virtuoso of the Paraguayan harp" had "captivated" the Kennedy Center audience.
- At the time of a 2007 appearance in Los Angeles, La Opinion described Duarte as "an extraordinary harpist" whose music "sounds so heavenly start as unprecedented."
- In May 2010, Carnegie Hall announced Duarte's May 2010 appearance at the historic venue as follows: "Celso Duarte is heir to a rich South American and Mexican musical heritage. ... Mr. Duarte interprets songs from the jaranero movement and creates original versions of South American folk music, often integrating the rhythms and traditions of jazz and world music."

== Discography ==
=== Solo ===
- De Sur a Sur (From South to South), 2006

=== Instrumentalist ===
- Lila Downs, Border (La Line), 2001 (appears on)
- Lila Downs, Una Sangre (One Blood), 2004 (appears on)
- Maria Full of Grace soundtrack, 2004 (collaboration with Julieta Venegas)
- Lila Downs, La Cantina, 2006 (appears on)
- Charanga Cakewalk, Chicano Zen, 2006 (appears on)
- Lila Downs, Shake Away/Ojo De Culebra, 2008 (appears on)
- Sofia Koutsovitis, Sube Azul, 2009 (appears on)
- Lila Downs y la Misteriosa, Lila Downs y la Misteriosa en Paris: Live à FIP, 2010 (appears on)
- The Chieftains & Ry Cooder, San Patricio, 2010 (appears on)
- Celso Piña, Sin Fecha de Caducidad, 2010 (appears on)
- Susanna Baca, Afrodiaspora, 2011 (appears on)
- Lila Downs y La Misteriosa (Sins and Miracles), Pecados Y Milagros 2011 (appears on)
