= Mundo Colombia =

Studio album by Celso Piña
- Released: April 26, 2002
- Genre: Cumbia
- Label: Peerless, Warner Music Latina

Mundo Colombia is an album of cumbias by Mexican musician Celso Piña. It was released in 2002 on the Peerless and Warner Music Latina labels. In 2019, it was selected by Mitú as one of the "Spanish-Language Albums Changed The Face And Feel Of The Music Industry".

== Track listing ==
1. El Tren (Mr. Cumbia Man) [5:26]
2. El Tiempo [4:31]
3. Como El Viento [4:47]
4. Fiesta En San Jacinto [2:48]
5. Caballo Viejo [3:46]
6. Oye [3:49]
7. Ronda Tocando [3:06]
8. La Piragua [4:54]
9. Libro Abierto 2:43
10. Yola Veo [4:18]
11. Cumbia Engolillá [3:50]
12. Para Entender Tu Dolor [3:51]
13. Callate Corazón [4:15]
