= La Cantina =

Italian restaurant in Seoul, South Korea

- Interactive map of La Cantina

Restaurant information
- Established: 1967
- Food type: Italian cuisine
- Location: 19, Eulji-ro, Jung District, Seoul, South Korea
- Coordinates: 37.5663°N 126.9799°E
- Other information

Seoul Future Heritage
- Reference no.: 2013-084

La Cantina (Korean: 라 칸티나) is a historic Italian restaurant in Jung District, Seoul, South Korea. It is the oldest still-operating Italian restaurant in South Korea, having been founded in 1967. The restaurant was designated a Seoul Future Heritage site by the Seoul Metropolitan Government.

The business was founded by Lee Jae-du (이재두). It has remained in the same location since its founding; its interior decoration has reportedly remained much the same since its founding. Initially, because Italian food ingredients were so uncommon in Seoul around the time of the restaurant's founding, it had to substitute ingredients that it could not find otherwise. For example, it reportedly used noodles similar to that of the Korean noodle dish kal-guksu in place of the Italian noodles linguine; eventually the restaurant made the food more authentic. In 1982, Lee's son Tae-hoon (이태훈) inherited the business; Tae-hoon fully took over operations after his father died in 2013. The restaurant had a branch in Gangnam District that closed in 1998, amidst the 1997 Asian financial crisis. In 2016, it was reported that the restaurant's employees were mostly long-time staff; the average age of the workers was in the 50s, and the youngest worker was in their mid-40s.

== See also ==
- List of oldest restaurants in South Korea
