= Joe Vasconcelos =

- Born: December 14, 1966 (age 59); Rio de Janeiro, Rio de Janeiro, Brazil
- Origin: Miami, Florida
- Genres: Contemporary worship music, contemporary Christian
- Occupations: Singer-songwriter, associate worship pastor
- Instruments: Vocals, guitar
- Years active: 2006–present
- Labels: Graça Music
- Website: www.joevasconcelos.com

Joe Vasconcelos (born December 14, 1966) is a Brazilian-American contemporary Christian music artist, worship leader, and songwriter from Rio de Janeiro, Rio de Janeiro, Brazil. He records his discography with Graça Music. His latest album is Passos de Fé, which was released in 2014.

== History ==
Settled in the United States 22 years ago, Joe Vasconcelos has always been devoted to praise and worship from the time he lived in Brazil, in the city of Governador Valadares (MG).

At age 11 he converted to the Gospel. Soon after, Vasconcelos moved to the U.S.. The talent of childhood was being improved, and in 1991, Joe joined the worship team who attended the church, facing the audience in Portuguese. Dedicated, attended various seminars ministry of praise, three of them promoted by Integrity Hosanna Music and taught by Ron Kenoly.

In 1994, after participating as worship leader of a crusade organized by Cerulo Morris, Joe had his ministry more than dedicated, began to receive numerous calls of American churches of different denominations. He was also responsible for organizing various gospel music concerts with leading international singers.

For over a decade, being abroad, led the worship team in an evangelical church in the United States. In 2000, he received the anointing for the ministry of the Word.

Two years after his ordination, attended the CONAD. II (National Congress of the Assemblies of God of Brazil in the United States), presenting alongside Ron Kenoly. In 2005, once again the partnership with Ron Kenoly: they are invited to participate in the celebrations for 75 years directed the General Convention of the Assemblies of God, which culminated with a mega event in Apoteose (RJ).

== 2006–present ==
In 2006, Joe released his first album in English, and developed a project in partnership with Ron Kenoly, the seminar Time2Worship International, a series of conferences.

The CD / DVD Amazed, part of the catalog of Grace Music, was recorded in the Bible Church of Peace in St. Paul, and with the participation of several Brazilian gospel artists such as David Quinlan, Adhemar de Campos, Toque no Altar, Mara Maravilha, and Ron Kenoly. He is currently working on his new album None Like You which has been filmed in Miami.

== Discography ==
- Amazed (2006)
- Maravilhado (2008)
- Sempre Confiarei (2011)
- None Like You (2013)
- Passos de Fé (2014)
