= Ixtli Martínez =

Mexican journalist, radio and television (born 1976)

Ixtli Xóchitl Martínez Jiménez (born in Oaxaca City in 1976) is a Mexican radio and television journalist.

== Path ==
As a communicator she has worked in various radio stations and local newspapers Oaxaca, and also been a correspondent in the radio news of Carlos Loret de Mola and reporter for the magazine "Contralínea". In 2008 she received the award "Freedom, Woman's Word" by work and career, and is currently a news correspondent for MVS and is married to journalist Virgilio Sánchez.

Martínez suffered an attack on June 10, 2010 while covering a note during a brawl raised in the Faculty of Law at the University Benito Juárez of Oaxaca, where she received a bullet wound in the thigh.
