= Canción mixteca =

Mexican folk song by José López Alavez

"Canción Mixteca" is a Mexican folk song written by Oaxacan composer José López Alavez (1889–1974). Lopez Alavez wrote the melody of the song in 1912, and composed the lyrics in 1915. Lopez Alavez describes his feelings of homesickness for his home region of Oaxaca after moving to Mexico City. In modern times, the song has become an anthem both for the region of Oaxaca and Mexican citizens living abroad who miss their homeland.

The song was used in the film Paris, Texas directed by Wim Wenders. The song was played by Ry Cooder with the lyrics being sung by Harry Dean Stanton.

== Lyrics ==
¡Qué lejos estoy del suelo donde he nacido!
Inmensa nostalgia invade mi pensamiento,
y, al verme, tan solo y triste cual hoja al viento,
¡quisiera llorar ‒ quisiera morir ‒ de sentimiento!

¡Oh tierra del sol! suspiro por verte.
Ahora que lejos yo vivo sin luz ‒ sin amor.
Y, al verme tan solo y triste cual hoja al viento,
quisiera llorar, quisiera morir de sentimiento.

So far am I from the land where I was born!
Immense nostalgia invades my thoughts,
and, to see myself, as lone and dismal as leaf on the wind,
I would that I'd weep ‒ I would that I'd die ‒ out of sorrow!

O land of sunshine! I sigh for-to see you.
Now that, far from you, I live without light ‒ without love.
And, to see myself, as lone and dismal as leaf on the wind,
I would that I'd weep ‒ I would that I'd die ‒ out of sorrow!
