= Celso Piña =

Mexican musician and producer (1953–2019)

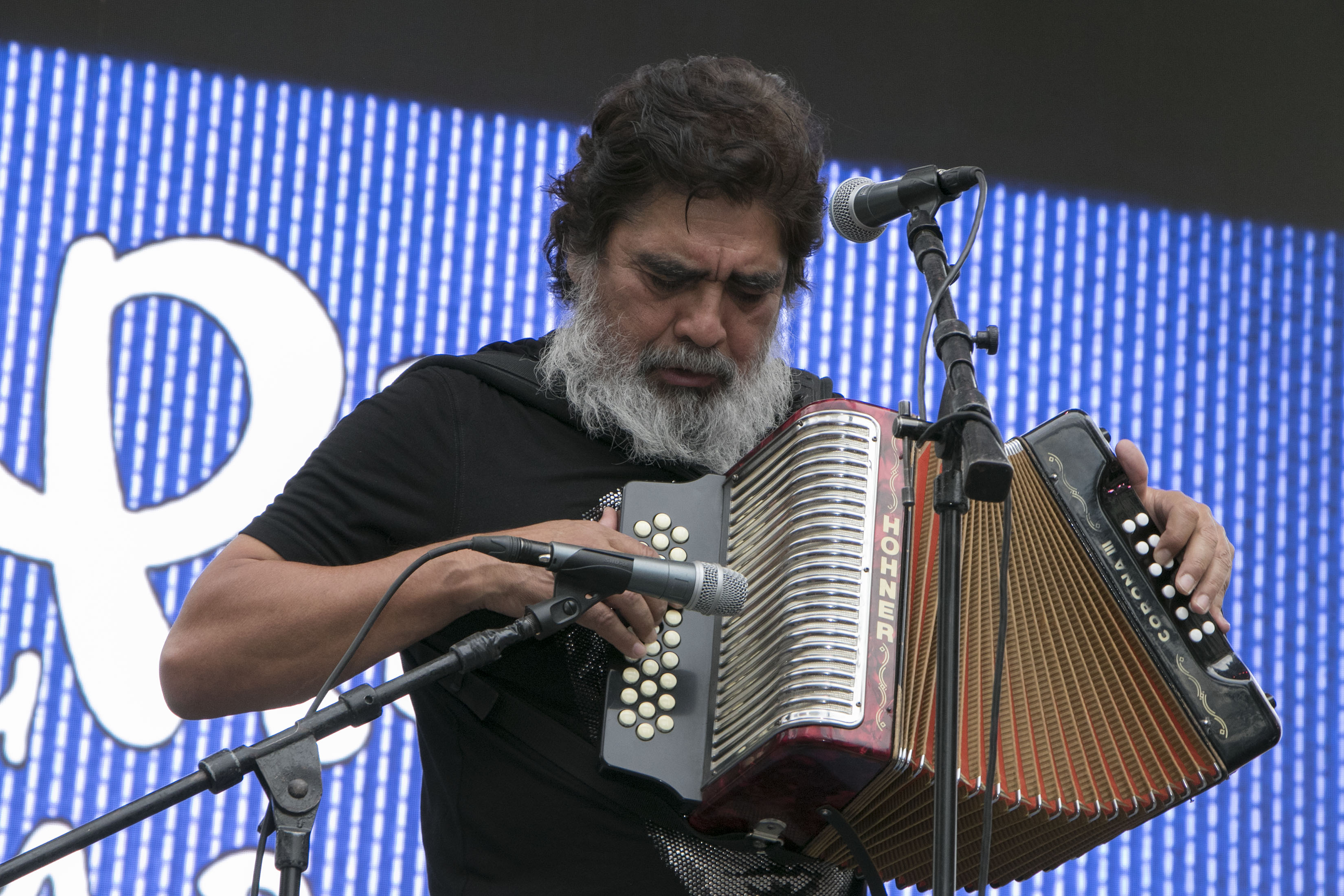
- Piña in 2012

Background information
- Born: Celso Pina Arvizu; April 6, 1953; Monterrey, Nuevo León, Mexico
- Died: August 21, 2019 (aged 66)
- Genre: Cumbia
- Occupations: Singer-songwriter; musician; producer
- Instruments: Accordion; vocals
- Years active: 1980–2019
- Label: La Tuna
- Website: celso.mx

Celso Piña Arvizu (April 6, 1953 – August 21, 2019) was a Mexican singer, composer and accordionist, mainly in the genre of cumbia, being one of the most important musicians in the style of "cumbia rebajada".

Piña was a pioneer in the mixture and fusion of tropical sounds, with many of his works having elements of cumbia, regional Mexicano, cumbia sonidera, ska, reggae, rap/hip-hop, R&B, etc. Piña is also known as El Rebelde del acordeón or the Cacique de la Campana.

== Early life ==
Celso Piña Arvizu was born on April 6, 1953, in Monterrey, Nuevo León, Mexico to Tita Arvizu and Isaac Piña. He was the oldest of 9 siblings. The name of Celso was chosen by his grandfather.

Throughout his childhood and teenage years, he held different jobs like working in a tortilla bakery, painter, helper in mechanic shops, and carpet installer, among others. Meanwhile he listened to groups like The Beatles, The Rolling Stones and musica norteña like that of Los Alegres de Terán and Antonio Tanguma.

== Career ==
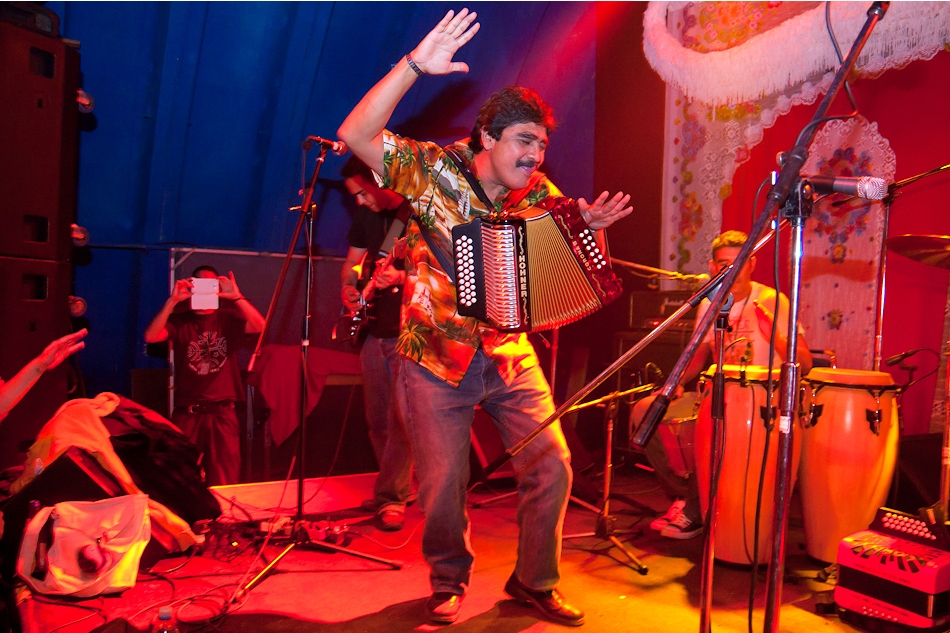
Fusion Festival 2012, Germany

=== Early career ===
Piña's first experience in the Monterey music scene began as a member of a group led by Ramón "El Gordo" Morales, Los Jarax. He was not satisfied by the tropical rhythms and ballads the group performed, where he played the maracas despite his wish to play the accordion.

Due to the popularity of the Colombian rhythms and cumbia rebajada in La Campana, Piña wished to play a different music genre. Through a friend from Colonia Independencia and the bailes de cintas, he was introduced to Colombian artists like Aníbal Velásquez Hurtado, Alfredo Gutiérrez y Los Corraleros de Majagual. In the '70s, he received his first accordion mended by his father, which allowed him to fully immerse himself in Colombian music. Piña was self-taught on the accordion with no formal training. It was through consistent playing and rehearsing that he developed his own musical style. Having lived for a majority of his life there, he titled one of his cumbias "Mi colonia Independencia", which is located at the heavily populated area of Cerro de la Campana, near downtown in Monterrey. His father purchased a second button accordion and modified it to achieve Celso's desired sound. His father also fabricated other Colombian instruments such as the Colombian caja and congos.

Piña shared with his parents his intent to leave his employment with the Hospital Infantil de Monterrey in order to pursue music full time, which his mother opposed. Nonetheless, he left his job to fully dedicate himself to cumbia colombiana, forming his own group, Ronda Bogotá, in 1975 alongside his siblings. The group featured Piña on vocals and accordion, his brother Enrique on bass, and his sister Juana on supporting vocals and congas. Piña made waves in the music scene, interpreting original music based on the classic standards of cumbia and vallenato. This musical interpretation did not garner a positive reception from the Monterey music scene, due to the popularity of other rhythms at the time such as tropical music and norteño. Celso y la Ronda Bogotá were determined to continue performing their musical style of cumbia to provide a local alternative to existing rhythms.

After several unsuccessful meetings with different record labels, La Ronda Bogotá met Felipe "Indio" Jimenez, artistic director of Discos Peerless, who agreed to launch their first album, Si mañana, in 1983, which included their first single, "La manda". Their first hits featured several cumbias such as "La cumbia de la paz", "El tren", "Como el viento" and the popular cover of "La piragua" (José Barros). During this time, performances by the Ronda Bogota were dismissed and negatively received.

On the following albums, the record labels starting focusing on Piña as an individual, releasing albums like Ronda Bogotá de Celso Piña and finally Celso Piña y su Ronda Bogotá. The decision was well received by his siblings, but other group members felt Piña was taking over the group, although the group name remained Celso Piña y su Ronda Bogotá.

Towards the end of the '90s, Piña was the most well-known representative of the cumbia colombiana movement in Monterrey. The fame brought on by Piña y La Ronda led to the formation of other groups performing Colombian music, like La Tropa Colombiana, made up by former Ronda Bogotá members. Said groups saturated the Monterrey and northern Mexico music scene, leading Piña y la Ronda Bogotá into a period of artistic stagnation in the late '90s.

=== Barrio bravo and the leap to international fame ===
With the emergence of the avanzada regia musical movement and the popularity of groups like Control Machete and El Gran Silencio, Piña decided to reinvent and fuse his classic cumbia sound with that of groups from different genres like rock, ska and hip hop.

The result of this fusion was the recording of the album Barrio Bravo in 2001, an album produced by Toy Selectah, member of Control Machete, who was invited by the bassist of El Gran Silencio, Julian Villareal. The collaborations in this album would go on to radically embody Piña's musical fusion with reggae, electronic music, dubstep, and sonidero. As well as the collaborations with Mexican rock figures like Rubén Albarrán of Cafe Tacvba, Blanquito Man of King Changó, Gabriel Bronsman "El queso" of Resorte, Poncho Figueroa of Santa Sabina y El Gran Silencio, and in the norteno genre with Lupe Esparza of Grupo Bronco. The album was Piña's definitive launch to fame in Mexico and in the Latin American music scene, resulting in several of his most popular hits Cumbia poder, Cumbia sobre el río, and Aunque no sea conmigo.

Writer and journalist Carlos Monsiváis wrote the prologue for Barrio Bravo's album cover, referring to Piña as, "a social phenomenon as they rightfully say, and a musical phenomenon as it is rightfully heard ... Celso Piña is a conductor of tribes, if he lived in medieval times, he'd be known as the accordionist of Hamelin." Barrio Bravo opened the door to more collaborations between rock and tropical music groups of Mexico, and for Piña's consistent performances in musical festivals and rock concerts.

In 2002, Piña recorded Mundo Colombia, featuring collaborations with artists like Julieta Venegas, Flaco Jiménez, Alejandro Marcovich, Alejandro Rosso and once again with Blanquito Man y "El queso" Bronsman. It was produced by Julián Villarreal, Alfonso Herrera and Toy Selectah.

In 2003, he played a concert in Monterrey that was attended by Gabriel García Márquez, with whom he struck up a friendship. In 2007, he was honored by the "Colombia tierra querida" association composed of Colombians living in Monterrey with the award "icon of Colombian culture." Piña performed in Colombia for the first time in 2010, where he was greeted by his greatest influences, Aníbal Velázquez and Alfredo Gutiérrez.

Celso had several successful international tours that included Germany, Spain, Portugal, Denmark, Sweden, the Czech Republic, Italy, France, Switzerland, Morocco, Colombia, Nicaragua, Guatemala, Argentina, Chile, Canada and the United States. Celso Piña received a Latin Grammy nomination for Best Contemporary Tropical Album in 2002 for Barrio Bravo.

== Death and remembrance ==
On August 21, 2019, Piña died from a heart attack in Monterrey, Mexico at the age of 66. He had felt unwell and checked in at the hospital San Vicente of his own accord and passed soon after.

A mass was held in his memory at the Basílica de Guadalupe of the Independencia neighborhood, where he was honored by hundreds of followers. After the service, his casket was driven around the neighborhood. A concert honoring his legacy was held in the Macroplaza de Monterrey on August 28, 2019, with performances from artists like El Gran Silencio, Inspector, Los Siriguayos, Kombolocos, and Los Kumbiamberos Rs, among others.

A series of murals with his image were created in the Independencia neighborhood. The Monterrey government has discussed naming a street in the city after Celso Piña.

== Documentary ==
The documentary Celso Piña: el rebelde del acordeón (2012) describes the rise of the sonidero groups and the widespread popularity of Colombian cumbia en La Indep, the Monterey neighborhood that Celso Piña was raised in and where he was the first to interpret the genre live in dances and family parties.

== Discography ==
Albums

- Si mañana (1983)
- Ronda Bogota de Celso Piña (1984)
- Celso Piña Y Su Ronda Bogotá (1985)
- Traicionera falsedad (1986)
- Tú y las nubes (1989)
- Noche de estrellas (1991)
- Dile (1996)
- Una Aventura Más (1999)
- Barrio bravo (2001)
- Rebelde (2002)
- Mundo Colombia (2002)
- Pachanguero (2002)
- Una Visión (2003)
- El Canto de un Rebelde para un... (2004)
- Sin Fecha de Caducidad (2009)
- Zona Preferente: En vivo desde el Auditorio Nacional (2012)

Compilations

- Antologia de un Rebelde (2000)
- Mis Primeras Grabaciones... Mis Primeros Exitos (2001)
- Trayectoria (2002)
- Desde Colombia (2002)
- Super Seis (2003)
- México y su Música (2005)
- 20 Grandes Éxitos (2005)
- Línea de Oro (2006)
- 12 Grandes Éxitos Vol.1 (2007)
- 12 Grandes Éxitos Vol.2 (2007)
- Gran Baile Con (2008)

Source: AllMusic
