= Jan Nickman =

Jan Nickman (born October 17, 1950) is an American film and television director, producer, cinematographer and writer. As the co-founder of Miramar Images, Inc. and Sacred Earth Pictures, Nickman's career in film and television spans four decades.

== Career ==
Nickman's career in film and television began as a studio camera person and editor with the ABC in Sydney, Australia. Upon returning to the United States and graduating with a degree in communications from Washington State University, Nickman then produced and created stage and lighting designs for leading-edge, live multi-media concerts combining rock bands with symphony orchestras along with his filmed images projected onto large screens above the performers. Most notably, "Leviticus" and "Trinity" performed by the Seattle Symphony orchestra. After directing and producing live productions, Nickman returned to television as a news photographer with NBC affiliate KING-TV in Seattle, Washington He also produced and reported news stories, particularly regarding environmental issues. Nickman eventually became a senior producer and director in the production department where he created, produced and directed the Emmy Award-winning television program REV, an innovative rock and roll series featuring live music performances, music reviews and comedy sketches. The program was responsible for debuting many musical groups including Queensrÿche and is commonly credited for catalyzing the Seattle music scene in the 1990s.

Nickman went on to co-found Miramar Images with the release of Natural States (1985) featuring the music of David Lanz and Paul Speer. The film was one of the largest selling, non-theatrical releases of its time and recognized as one of the top 10 videos by People magazine. Natural States went double platinum and launched the success of Miramar Images. Miramar then released two more of Nickman's films, Desert Vision, and Canyon Dreams which earned Tangerine Dream a Grammy nomination for their music score.

In 1990, Nickman directed and co-produced The Mind's Eye: A Computer Animation Odyssey, the first of the Mind's Eye series, a collection of animated computer-generated imagery (CGI). His body of work, which also includes Planetary Traveler and Infinity's Child has firmly established him as a computer-generated imagery (CGI) pioneer and a master of long-form films that use music as the primary narrative.

Nickman's film, The Mind's Eye, was a double platinum-selling film considered to be a milestone in the field of computer animation and reached number 12 on Billboard′s video hits chart. It was the first full length film ever created entirely with CGI (computer animation). Combining the artistry of numerous computer animators from around the world with a score by James Reynolds, The Mind's Eye is credited with giving rise to such films as Toy Story. Animation Magazine reviewer Karl Rathcke wrote the film was "... the type of audio-visual 'head trip' for the 90's that Stanley Kubrick's 2001: A Space Odyssey was for the 60's."

In 1995 Nickman's feature film "Third Stone from the Sun" was released. The film received the Gold Special Jury Award (top honors) at the Houston International Film Festival and also screened at the first International Environmental Film Festival in Boulder, Colorado, and the Seattle International Film Festival among others.

Donald Liebenson of the Chicago Tribune described Nickman's next release, Planetary Traveler, as "boldly [going] where no computer animation video has gone before." At a time when computer animation was created solely on dedicated computer graphics work stations, Planetary Traveler became the first original, full-length program ever created entirely on standard desk-top computers. The seminal work was the result of a two-year collaboration by Nickman with seven artists from five different states via the internet. Former Tangerine Dream member Paul Haslinger composed the music score. As a result, Nickman was invited to give the keynote address at the MacWorld Conference in Düsseldorf, Germany, in November 1997. The sequel to Planetary Traveler is titled Infinity's Child and was released in 1999.

Two of Nickman's most recent films, Echoes of Creation and Sacred Earth began airing on Public Television nationwide in 2015. Both films are true to his signature fusing of motion picture to music and were specifically designed as a way for viewers to connect emotionally with the beauty of our planet, rather than intellectualize it through a discussion about it. Using music as the narrative, Echoes of Creation is a 40-minute journey through Alaska, the Pacific Northwest and as far south as California, featuring a soundtrack by Grammy nominated composer David Arkenstone and spoken word by Karen Hutton. Its prequel Sacred Earth also follows Nickman's unique fusion of picture to music throughout the American Southwest, featuring music by Grammy-nominated composer David Lanz and spoken word by Academy Award-winning actor Linda Hunt and in the finale features a dance performance by Caroline Richardson, former First Soloist with the National Ballet of Canada.

== Awards ==
- NATAS Emmy Award, A Day In The Life of The Cascades, 1980
- NATAS Emmy Award, REV Television Series, 1984
- The Emerald City Awards, Emerald Award of Merit, 1986, Natural States, Miramar
- International Film and TV Festival of New York, Silver Medal Winner, 1987, Desert Vision, Miramar
- Video Choice Magazine, Top Choice Award, 1988, Natural States, Miramar
- Chicago International Film Festival, Silver Plaque, 1989, Gift of The Whales, Miramar
- International Film Festival of New York, Finalist Certificate, 1989, Gift of The Whales, Miramar
- Parents' Choice Awards, Parents' Choice Honor, 1989, Gift of The Whales, Miramar
- Cindy Awards, Special Achievement Award, 1990, The Mind's Eye
- National Educational Film & Video Awards, Gold Apple Award, 1990, Gift of The Whales, Miramar
- American Film & Video Festival, Red Ribbon Award Winner, 1990, Gift of The Whales
- American Film & Video Festival, Blue Ribbon Award (Top Honor), 1991, The Mind's Eye, Miramar
- Telly Awards, Bronze Telly Award, 1991, Gift of The Whales, Miramar
- Telly Awards, Silver Telly Award (Top Honor), 1991, The Mind's Eye, Miramar

== Filmography ==
- 1985 Natural States (music by David Lanz and Paul Speer)
- 1986 Desert Visions (music by Lanz and Speer)
- 1987 Canyon Dreams (music by Tangerine Dream)
- 1990 Gift of the Whales (music by Lanz and Speer)
- 1990 The Mind's Eye (music by James Reynolds)
- 1992 True North (music by Paul Speer, Jonn Serrie, James Reynolds, and Tangerine Dream)
- 1992 Water Colors (music by Peter Bardens)
- 1995 Third Stone from the Sun (music by Steven Ray Allen, David Arkenstone, David Lanz, James Reynolds. Jonn Serrie, and Paul Speer)
- 1996 Elroy's Toy
- 1997 Power Moves (music by James Reynolds)
- 1997 Planetary Traveler (music by Paul Haslinger)
- 1999 Infinity's Child (music by Paul Haslinger)
- 2008 Living Temples (music by David Lanz)
- 2014 Sacred Earth (music by David Lanz and Gary Stroutsos)
- 2015 Echoes of Creation (music by David Arkenstone)
