= Narada Smooth Jazz =

Compilation album by Various artists
- Released: 1997
- Genre: Smooth jazz
- Length: 127:49
- Label: Narada

Professional ratings
Review scores
Source	Rating
Allmusic	link

Narada Smooth Jazz is a 1997 compilation release by Narada. It peaked at #25 on Billboard's Top Contemporary Jazz Albums in the same year.

== Track listing ==
- 1.01 "Redwood/Nocturne" – Spencer Brewer – 4:20
- 1.02 "Gravity" – Jesse Cook – 3:57
- 1.03 "Dancing With The Bear" – Budi Siebert – 5:06
- 1.04 "Mil Amores" – Doug Cameron – 6:44
- 1.05 "Sunday In Alsace" – Friedemann Witecka – 5:55 (Composed by: Friedemann Witecka and Johannes Wohlleben)
- 1.06 "Thinking Of You" – Oscar Lopez – 4:18
- 1.07 "Zuni Rain" – Michael Gettel – 4:02
- 1.08 "Painted Birds" – Bernardo Rubaja – 4:06 (Composed by: Federico Ramos)
- 1.09 "Rest Assured" – Randy Roos – 5:10
- 1.10 "Shall We? (edit)" – Nando Lauria – 3:56
- 1.11 "La Couronne" – Martin Kolbe – 5:35
- 1.12 "Just Dreamin" – Richard Souther – 5:10
- 1.13 "Heart & Beat" – Ralf Illenberger – 4:52
- 1.14 "Take The High Road" – David Lanz – 2:26
- 2.01 "Joy of Beltane" – Friedemann Witecka – 3:43 (Composed by: Friedemann Witecka and Emmanuel Séjourné)
- 2.02 "Blue Rock Road" – Bradley Joseph – 3:13
- 2.03 "The Beauty Within" – Budi Siebert – 4:33
- 2.04 "Desperate Love" – Oscar Lopez – 4:04
- 2.05 St. Tropez" – Doug Cameron – 5:52 (Composed by: Doug Cameron and Chris Boardman)
- 2.06 "River Run" – Michael Gettel – 7:27
- 2.07 "Breeze From Saintes Maries" – Jesse Cook – 5:20
- 2.08 "Dab in Da Mida" – Brian Mann – 3:23
- 2.09 "Twelve Three" – Randy Roos – 6:08
- 2.10 "Hazel" – Trapezoid – 4:06 (Composed by: Bobby Read)
- 2.11 "Dancing Kachinas" – Ralf Illenberger – 3:22
- 2.12 "Monkey Talk" – Spencer Brewer – 3:29
- 2.13 "Companero" – Richard Souther – 3:55 (Composed by: Eric Persing)
- 2.14 "If I Fell" – Nando Lauria – 3:37 (Composed by: Lennon–McCartney)
