= Cristofori's Dream =

Studio album by David Lanz
- Released: 1988
- Recorded: November 1987–April 1988
- Studio: Miramar Studios
- Genre: New-age, smooth jazz, classical
- Length: 46:13
- Label: Narada Productions
- Producer: Paul Speer/David Lanz co-producer

David Lanz chronology
Desert Vision (1987)	Cristofori's Dream (1988)	Skyline Firedance (1990)

Professional ratings
Review scores
Source	Rating
AllMusic	5/5 stars

Cristofori's Dream is David Lanz's seventh studio album, released in 1988. The album was the only Lanz album to top Billboard's "Top New Age Albums" chart as well as the only album to chart on the Billboard 200, peaking at #180.

== Concept ==
The album was dedicated to (and named after) Bartolomeo Cristofori, who is widely regarded to be the inventor of the piano.

== Reception ==
William Ruhlmann of AllMusic gave the album five stars, opining "its selections have a calm elegance, as Lanz spends most of his time in the upper register of the piano delivering precise, articulated melodies".

== Track listing ==
All songs written by David Lanz, except where noted.

No.	Title	Writer(s)	Length
1.	"Cristofori's Dream"		6:10
2.	"Spiral Dance"		6:17
3.	"Green into Gold"		10:03
4.	"Wings to Altair"		6:20
5.	"Summer's Child"		6:13
6.	"Free Fall"		4:23
7.	"A Whiter Shade of Pale"	Gary Brooker, Keith Reid, Matthew Fisher	6:47

== Personnel ==
The music features the following.

- David Lanz – Bells, Composer, Piano, Producer, Synthesizer
- Steven Ray Allen – Arranger, Acoustic bass, Acoustic guitar, Electric bass, Conductor, Fretless bass, Electric guitar
- Gary Brooker, Keith Reid, Matthew Fisher – Composers
- Freeman Patterson – Cover photo
- John Morey, Barbara Richardson – Designers
- Al Swanson – Digital Assembly, Digital Editing
- Reed Ruddy, Paul Speer – Engineers
- Bill Cannon – Illustrator
- Randy Kling – Mastering
- Richard Aaron, Alex Segal, Mary Tapiro, Deborah Yamak – Cellists
- Neal Speer – Drums
- Nancy Rumbel – English horn, Oboe
- Richard Warner – Flute, Soprano sax
- Matthew Fisher – Organ
- Luis Peralta, James Reynolds – Percussion
- Jonn Serrie – Synthesizer
- Betty Agent, Karie Prescott, Ruth Sereque, Eileen Swanson – Violists
- Linda Anderson, Bryan Boughten, Deede Cook, Stephen Daniels, Ingric Fredricikson, Ingrid Fredrickson, Christine Olason, John Pilskog Marjorie Talvi – Violinists

== Charts ==
Chart (1988)	Position
Billboard New Age Albums	1
Billboard 200	180
