= AppleMasters =

Group of selected people who used the Apple Macintosh

AppleMasters was a group of selected people from all over the world who used and endorsed the Apple Macintosh computer. According to Apple, AppleMasters were "an international group of educators, artists, designers, writers, producers, architects, inventors, scientists, business leaders, humanitarians, musicians, athletes, and others who think different." Members would be invited to events and workshops to explore creative new ways to use emerging Apple technology - like digital video or CD-ROMs. Later as part of Apple's "Think Different" advertising campaign, Apple would use the members in various forms of advertising - including company events and commercials. In return, Apple would reimburse the members with free computers, technical support for new ideas, and use of other Apple branded equipment. The more active members included Sinbad, Herbie Hancock, James Woods, Gregory Hines, and Bryan Adams. A list of active members and alumni was included on Apple's website.

== Duration of the program ==
The AppleMasters program was launched in 1996. The program was managed globally by Kanwal Sharma. Based on findings at archive.org's Wayback Machine, Apple removed the program from their web site on or before August 7, 2002. During the program's life, the following people were members:

- Bryan Adams
- Douglas Adams
- Charly Alberti
- Muhammad Ali
- John A. Alonzo
- Garth Ancier
- Dana Atchley
- Harry Marks
- Lauren Bacall
- Michael Backes
- John Perry Barlow
- John Benson
- Richard Benson
- Howard L. Bingham
- Chris Bonington
- Russell Preston Brown
- Tom Clancy
- Peter Cochrane OBE
- Michael Crichton
- Paul Brooks Davis
- Richard Dawkins
- Louis Fishauf
- Trevor Flett
- Donald Glaser
- Zaha Hadid
- Louis Herman
- Damien Hirst
- Takenobu Igarashi
- Jennifer Jason Leigh
- Mae Jemison
- Seymour Powell
- Sinbad
- Fiorella Terenzi
- Tracey Ullman
