= 20 Years of Narada Piano =

Compilation album by Various artists
- Released: 2001
- Genres: Instrumental, adult contemporary, easy listening, new age
- Label: Narada

Professional ratings
Review scores
Source	Rating
Allmusic	3.5/5 stars

20 Years of Narada Piano is a 2001 compilation release by Narada. It peaked at #12 on Billboard's Top New Age album charts in the same year.

== Track listing ==
- 1.1 "Endings" – Michael Jones – 5:33
- 1.2 "Sunrise" – Kostia – 5:02
- 1.3 "Dark Eyes" – Wayne Gratz – 4:07
- 1.4 "Beloved" – David Lanz – 3:39
- 1.5 "Water Circles" – Mia Jang – 4:40
- 1.6 "Minor Truths" – Fred Simon – 2:25
- 1.7 "Poetic Justice" – Sheila Larkin – 4:48
- 1.8 "Bethel" – Paul Cardall – 2:56
- 1.9 "Orcas" – Michael Gettel – 3:49
- 1.10 "Jonathan's Lullaby" – Ira Stein – 4:54
- 1.11 "August 23, 1962" – Sheldon Mirowitz – 3:26
- 1.12 "Innocence" – Spencer Brewer – 2:57
- 1.13 "Watercolors" – Michael Gettel – 3:56
- 1.14 "Good Question" – Wayne Gratz – 2:33
- 1.15 "Flowers On The Water" – Kostia – 4:31
- 1.16 "La Source" – Ira Stein – 2:07
- 1.17 "Ghost Mountain" – Spencer Brewer – 4:47
- 2.1 "Before The Last Leaf Falls" – David Lanz – 3:26
- 2.2 "Diamonds For Stones" – Paul Cardall – 2:42
- 2.3 "First Light" – Michael Whalen – 2:33
- 2.4 "Evening" – Michael Jones – 5:07
- 2.5 "Aspens In January" – Michael Gettel – 7:23
- 2.6 "Lily Pond" – Mia Jang – 3:37
- 2.7 "Ever After" – Keiko Matsui – 5:44 (Additional performer – Bob James)
- 2.8 "Continuum" – Ira Stain – 3:06
- 2.9 "Sister Bay" – Fred Simon – 2:23
- 2.10 "Vesuvius" – David Lanz – 4:10
- 2.11 "First Kiss" – David Arkenstone – 3:25
- 2.12 "The Glen" – Bradley Joseph – 4:07
- 2.13 "Turning" – Bobby Read – 4:08
- 2.14 "Return To Love" – Michael Jones – 4:11
- 2.15 "Light And Darkening" – Allaudin Mathieu – 7:16
- 2.16 "Which Is Yes" – Spencer Brewer – 4:07
- 2.17 "Strawberry Fields Forever" – David Lanz (Composers: Lennon–McCartney) – 3:53

== See also ==
- Grand Piano (Narada Anniversary Collection)
- Narada Smooth Jazz
- The Next Generation - Narada Sampler
- Stories (Narada Artist Collection)
- Narada Film and Television Music Sampler
