= Fiorella Terenzi =

Italian astrophysicist, musician

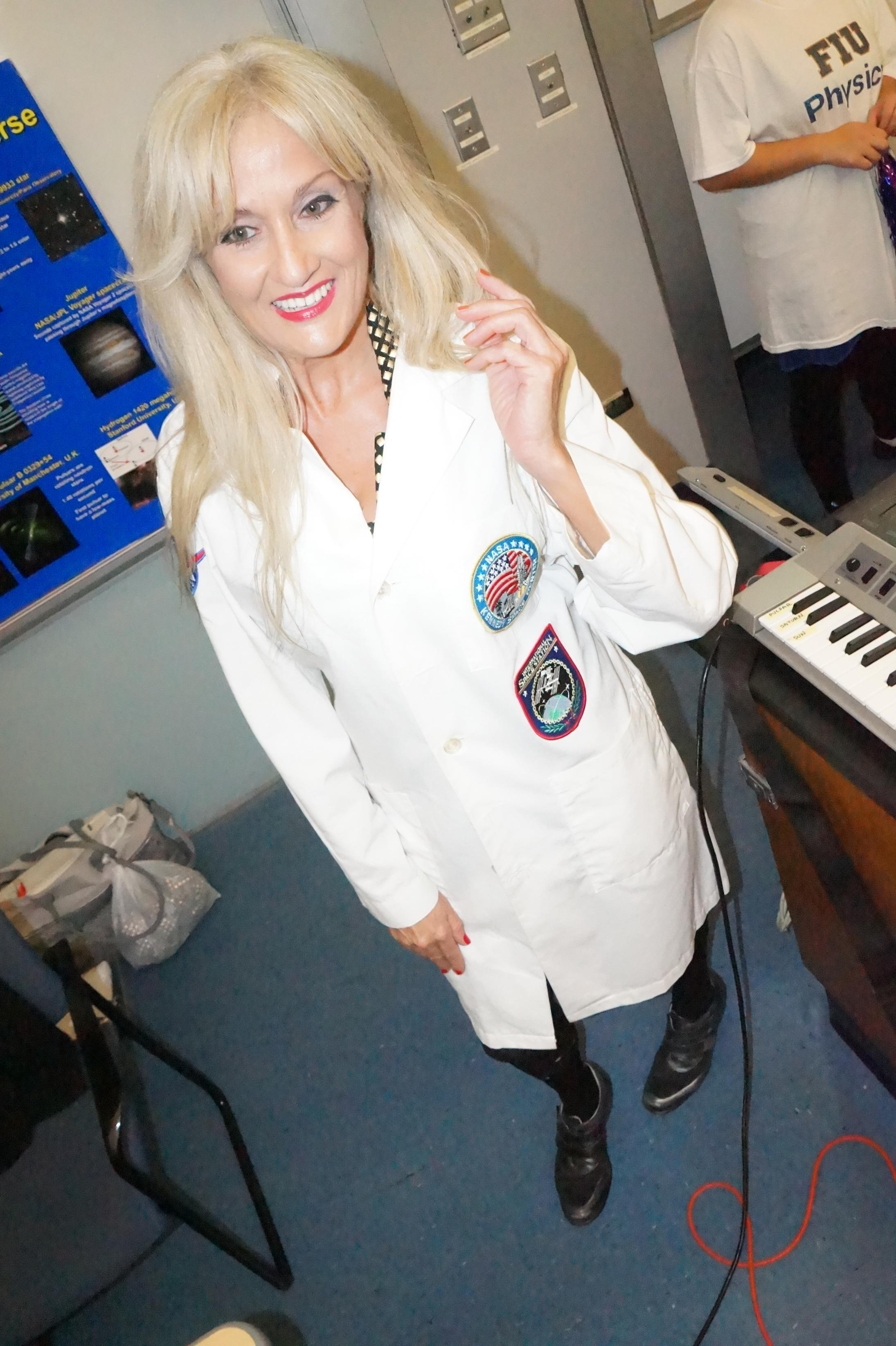
- Born: 1961 or 1962 (age 63–65); Milan, Italy
- Education: University of Milan, Italy (doctorate/PhD), University of California, San Diego (visiting researcher)
- Occupations: Astrophysicist, professor, author, recording artist Fields: Astronomy, astrophysics, space science, planetary science, education, public outreach, innovations, music
- Organization(s): Florida International University, Miami, Florida, USA
- Known for: Acoustic astronomy, music from the galaxies, invisible universe, audification or sonification of celestial data, Heavenly Knowledge

Fiorella Terenzi
- Labels: Island/PolyGram Records, Mercury records, Giant/Warner Bros. Records

Fiorella Terenzi is an Italian-born astrophysicist, author and recording artist who is best known for taking recordings of radio waves from distant galaxies and turning them into music. She received her doctorate from the University of Milan but is currently based in the United States.

Described by Time magazine as "a cross between Carl Sagan and Madonna", Terenzi has studied opera and composition at Conservatory G. Verdi, Corsi Popolari Serali and taught physics and astronomy at various U.S. colleges and universities; she is currently on the full-time faculty at Florida International University in Miami. In research at the Computer Audio Research Laboratory, University of California, San Diego, she pioneered techniques to convert radio waves emanating from distant galaxies into sound, with some of the results released by Island Records on her CD Music from the Galaxies. The goal of her audification (or sonification) of celestial data is to investigate how sound could reflect chemical, dynamical and physical properties of celestial objects, which she calls "Acoustic Astronomy".

== Media appearances ==
Terenzi's global media appearances include television and radio segments on CNN's Future Watch, The Dennis Miller Show, SyFy, NPR's Talk of the Nation, Weekend Edition and Science Friday, Newsweek on Air, Strange Universe, History's The Universe and Ancient Aliens, and others.

She has appeared and/or is referenced in numerous print media, including The Wall Street Journal, People, Time, The Quest, Electronic Musician, Glamour, Details, Los Angeles Reader, and Los Angeles Daily News, and has appeared internationally on the covers of Mondo 2000, New Frontier, Atari Explorer, Extropy, Composer USA, CD-ROM Today and Eye Weekly (Toronto, Canada). She is profiled in the April 2017 edition of Rockerilla, a monthly Italian music and cinema magazine.

== Public speaking / lectures ==
In lectures at University of California, San Diego, Stanford, MIT, the Smithsonian Institution, the American Museum of Natural History (NY), and in performances, live and on TV, in the US, Europe, and Japan, Terenzi has combined science and art to awaken people to the wonders of the universe. She has moderated hundreds of panels on science, technology, education and public outreach, from Digital Hollywood to MacWorld, and chaired the "Techno 2000" symposium at Pepperdine University. Terenzi's speaking engagements embrace such topics as "Globalization of Education", "Women in Space", "The Business of Space", "Values for a New Civilization", "Art, Intelligence & Artificial Intelligence" and, most notably, "Heavenly Knowledge" and "Invisible Universe".

Terenzi addressed the New York Times' International Luxury Conference, a two-day event bringing together over 500 business and creative leaders in Miami on December 2–3, 2014, in a talk entitled "The Collaborative Mind: Bridging Astrophysics and Aesthetics", and was interviewed on AriseTV's Arise Xchange news program in connection with her talk.

On April 2, 2017, Terenzi spoke at the University of Miami for the premiere of "Universal Language", a documentary film exploring the source of music and vibrations, and their effect on the mind, body and soul, as told through the eyes of a deaf child, and she was previously interviewed for the film during its production.

On October 18, 2018, Terenzi participated on a panel at the Digital Hollywood Los Angeles event discussing "Women on the Creative Edge: Experiences in a Changing Landscape", and on October 29, 2018, she delivered a talk entitled "Star Songs: Experiencing the Unseeable" at California State University Channel Islands, where she also presented her multimedia musical production "Let's Get Astrophysical" during the spring 2019 semester. On January 23, 2019, Terenzi also spoke on "The 4 Es of STEM Education: Entertain, Educate, Enthrall and Engage" at California State University, Northridge.

On May 21, 2019, Terenzi again participated on a panel at the Digital Hollywood Los Angeles event discussing "Women on the Creative Edge: From Film to TV to Athletes, Wellness & Technology".

== Professor / Astrophysicist ==
During her term as Director of New Media at the Miami Museum of Science and Space Transit Planetarium, Terenzi arranged and hosted events, including "National Astronomy Day", produced planetarium shows, including "Stars of the Seasons/Stars of the Sea", developed content for grants, including a NASA grant to deliver earth/space science online for high schools, and spoke at events from the NSF-funded "Girls in Science" program, to the Florida Planetarium Directors Association, to the international State of the World Forum in New York.

Terenzi has taught astronomy and physics at Pace University (New York), City University of New York's (Borough of Manhattan Community College and Bronx Community College), Brevard Community College, Pierce and Glendale College (Los Angeles). Currently, she is a full-time Professor of Astronomy and Physics at Florida International University (FIU), Miami, where in 2017 she received an FIU College of Arts, Sciences & Education Award for Engagement, which recognizes outstanding faculty who have distinguished themselves in the area of engagement.

FIU's new Stocker AstroScience Center, opened in November 2013, includes an interactive exhibit highlighting Terenzi's research on the audification (or sonification) of celestial data, entitled "Acoustic Astronomy: The Sounds of the Universe".

Terenzi organized and hosted a March 2, 2018 event for FIU's College of Arts, Science & Education entitled "Physics & Ferraris", showcasing a variety of exotic Ferrari sports cars and featuring an address by renowned inventor, vehicle designer, and former Walt Disney Imagineering R&D president, Bran Ferren, whose talk explained the physics behind why various vehicles, ranging from airplanes to race cars, work.

On November 18, 2018, FIU presented Terenzi with its 2018 Torch Award for Outstanding Faculty, honoring the lasting impression she has made on the lives of the university's students and alumni.

== Recording artist ==
- Music from the Galaxies (Island/PolyGram Records, 1991)
- The Gate to the Mind's Eye soundtrack – Thomas Dolby; vocals by Terenzi (Giant/Warner Bros. Records, 1994)
- From Here to Tranquillity Vol. 4 – various artists (Silent Records, 1995)
- Ixlandia – Jonn Serrie; Terenzi, guest artist/narrator (Miramar Records, 1995)
- Beyond Life With Timothy Leary – various artists; dance/trance CD and video tribute to Dr. Timothy Leary (Mercury Records, 1996)
- Musica Stellare (Unipro, Grandi Atmosfere, 1998)
- Trance Planet Vol. 5 – various artists (Triloka Records, 2000)

Terenzi has also collaborated with Herbie Hancock and Ornette Coleman. Samples of her Music from the Galaxies track "Sidereal Breath" appear on the Massive Attack track "Karmacoma", from the album Protection (Virgin Records, 1995).

In June 2017, Terenzi appeared on electronic artist Manipulant's (David Speakman) album Eclectro. The song "Doctor, I Need Your Expertise" features Terenzi describing the sounds of space combined with an electronic backdrop, simulating a journey through the Solar System.

== Authors: Books and publications ==
Formerly represented by talent/literary agents the William Morris Agency, Terenzi is best known for her CD-ROM Invisible Universe (Voyager Company, 1995), which blends astronomy and music into an entertaining and enlightening voyage through the stars. The title won the SIGCAT (Special Interest Group on CD Applications and Technology) award for "Most Creative Application of Multimedia in Higher and Adult Education".

Terenzi is also known for a sexually charged book about science entitled Heavenly Knowledge (Avon Books/HarperCollins), which explores astronomy as a metaphor for human relationships and humanity's place in the universe. The book, covered on ABC Radio, Talk of The Nation, BBC Radio, and SyFy, has been translated into Italian (Musica Dalle Stelle, Sterling Kupfer)—bundled with her music CD Galactically Yours—as well as German (Der Kosmos ist weiblich, Bertelsmann/Goldmann), Latvian and other languages.

Terenzi wrote the foreword for Paula Berinstein's book Making Space Happen: Private Space Efforts and the People Behind Them and has been featured in a full chapter in Laura Woodmansee's Women of Space: Cool Careers on the Final Frontier and in the music and technology book The Art of Digital Music by Kelli Richards and David Battino. She also provided a technical review of the educational text book The Physics of Everyday Phenomena by Thomas Griffith, and University Physics for the Physical and Life Sciences by Philip Kesten and David Tauk.

== Outreach and innovations ==
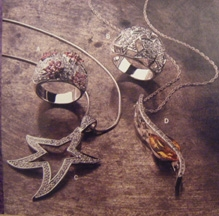

Among her outreach projects, Terenzi created the grant-winning "BCC Space & Astronomy Lecture Series", to inspire and educate the public about the universe.

She has developed several learning modules: "The Business of Space", to promote cultural diversity and global awareness about space and astronomy; "Astronomy in Paintings, Frescos, and Engravings", on how art has been used to explain the Universe from stars to galaxies; "Sounds of the Universe: Acoustic Astronomy", to stimulate intellectual curiosity and individual thinking; and an "Invisible Universe" learning module to explore celestial objects in multi-wavelengths.

Terenzi's lectures combine science and art with knowledge and emotion, a concept she calls "Emotional Learning," based on the 4 "E"s: "Entertain, Educate, Enlighten, and Enthrall." As Terenzi has stated, "When you are engaged on these multiple levels, learning finds an emotional home, and it is remembered forever."

She has created original collections of stellar-themed jewelry designs based on the color and symmetry of stars and galaxies, including GemAllure and Stellare for shopping networks Shop NBC and QVC Japan.

Terenzi premiered her "Let's Get Astrophysical" multimedia show for the Miami Beach Centennial Celebration on March 23, 2015, on the oceanfront Hard Rock Rising stage in South Beach. The show featured the first and only top 15 stellar-themed pop song countdown, including songs from Muse, OneRepublic, Oasis, Incubus, Fall Out Boy, Katy Perry, Hardwell and Daft Punk, combined with live DJs, musicians, dancers and acrobats, plus a laser light show. "Let's Get Astrophysical" was successfully reprised on May 3–4, 2019 at the Arts Under the Stars Festival at California State University Channel Islands.

== Scientific advisory ==
Terenzi is the first person to be a member of both the National Academy of Recording Arts & Sciences (Grammy Awards) and the American Astronomical Society. She has been an Apple Computer AppleMaster since 1994, and she is the founder of the Ferrari Club of America – Florida Region.

She is an "Adviser and Scientific Consultant" to the Italian Academy of Food for the "Italian Food in Space" effort, enabling NASA Space Shuttle mission STS-120 (October 23, 2007) to include a unique Italian menu consumed and shared among the astronauts in the International Space Station on the 5th day of its mission. She worked with ASI/ESA astronaut Paolo Nespoli, who was a crew member on the shuttle and ISS.

Terenzi served on the Scientific Advisory Board for the Lifeboat Foundation and on the Foundation's Asteroid/Comet Impacts Board.

Zegna fashion designer Stefano Pilati commissioned Terenzi to create a journey into space, using real images and her acoustic astronomy sounds in a video for Zegna's Fall-Winter 2014 Men's Collection. This new union of fashion and astrophysics was described by the New York Times as "Zegna's Very Big Bang", and generated extensive worldwide publicity. "No one has ever done anything like this before", said Gildo Zegna.

A new version of the Zegna video, which was a collaboration between Terenzi, fellow astrophysicist Neil deGrasse Tyson, and Pilati, was entitled "City and Nature – Scientist Cut" and formed the framework of an innovative 23-window display at Harrods, the luxury London department store. From October 2–19, 2014, new "Whispering Window" technology allowed Terenzi's space sounds, accompanied by the music of Tchaikovsky, to be shared with passing pedestrians, in order to demonstrate how science and fashion complement one another.
