= Tingstad and Rumbel =

American musical group

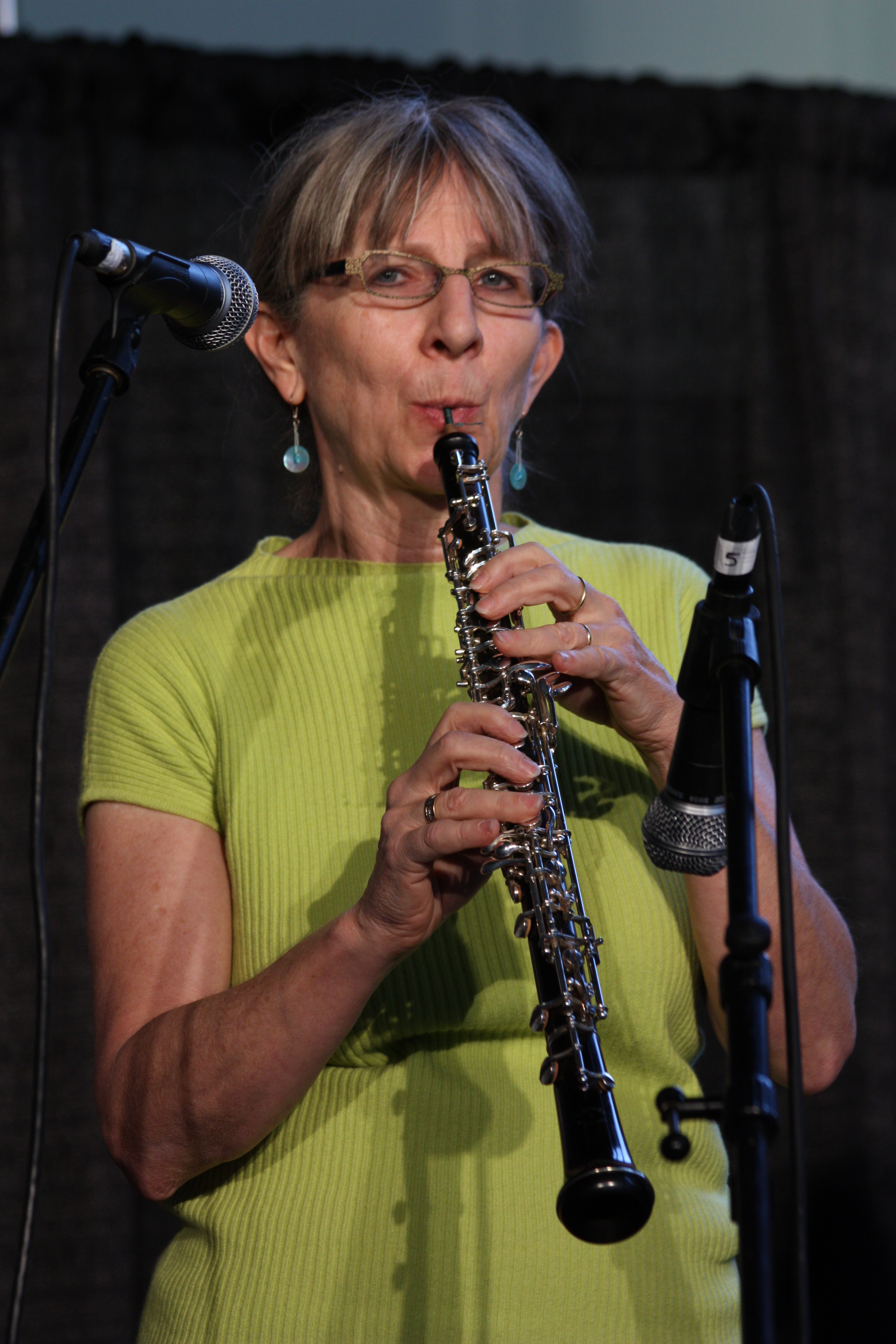
- Nancy Rumbel, Northwest Folklife Festival (2010)

Background information
- Origin: Seattle, Washington, United States
- Genres: New-age, chamber jazz
- Years active: 1985–present
- Labels: Narada; Cheshire Records
- Members: Eric Tingstad; Nancy Rumbel
- Website: tingstadrumbel.com

Eric Tingstad and Nancy Rumbel are musicians who have performed, recorded and traveled together since 1985, and are responsible for 19 albums.

Eric Tingstad is a composer who plays fingerstyle guitar. Nancy Rumbel plays oboe, English horn and the double ocarina. Eric and Nancy began their collaboration in 1985. Their debut album was The Gift. Their album American Acoustic was honored as "Acoustic Instrumental Album of the Year" in 1998. In 2000, they appeared at Carnegie Hall. Their album Acoustic Garden received the Award for Best New Age Album at the 45th Grammy Awards in February 2003.

== Biographies ==
Nancy grew up in San Antonio and continued her musical education at Northwestern University, where she was introduced to new influences and styles. Intrigued by ethnomusicology, she joined the Paul Winter Consort. Eric grew up in Seattle and attended Western Washington University where he was trained in the Segovian classic guitar tradition. He is a product of influences such as Led Zeppelin, Hawaiian slack-key guitar, Ravi Shankar, and Martin Denny.

== Discography ==
- 1985 - The Gift: Acoustic Offerings for the Holiday Season
- 1986 - Emerald (with Spencer Brewer)
- 1987 - Woodlands (with David Lanz)
- 1988 - Legends
- 1990 - Homeland
- 1991 - In the Garden
- 1993 - Give and Take
- 1994 - Star of Wonder
- 1995 - A Sense of Place (Tingstad solo)
- 1995 - Notes from the Tree of Life (Rumbel solo)
- 1997 - Pastorale: Music of Nature and Grace
- 1998 - American Acoustic (2-CD set)
- 2000 - Paradise
- 2001 - A Dream and a Wish: An Offering of Children's Classics
- 2002 - Acoustic Garden (Grammy winner)
- 2004 - Comfort and Joy
- 2005 - A Moment's Peace
- 2009 - Leap of Faith

=== Compilation appearances ===
- New Age Music & New Sounds Vol.67 - "Liberty"
- Narada Film and Television Music Sampler
- Narada Collection Series : A Childhood Remembered : A Musical Tribute To The Wonder Of Childhood
