= Acoustic Garden =

Studio album by Tingstad and Rumbel
- Released: August 13, 2002
- Recorded: April 2002
- Genre: Chamber jazz, new age, neoclassical new age
- Length: 51:17
- Label: Narada Records

Tingstad and Rumbel chronology
A Dream and a Wish: An Offering of Children's Classics (2002)	Acoustic Garden (2002)	Comfort and Joy (2004)

Acoustic Garden is a studio album by American musicians Tingstad and Rumbel, released on August 13, 2002 by Narada Records and recorded in April 2002. It received the Grammy Award for Best New Age Album at the 45th Grammy Awards in 2003.

== Track listing ==
1. "Acoustic Garden" (Rumbel, Tingstad) – 4:19
2. "Blue Martini" (Rumbel, Tingstad) – 3:36
3. "Shamrock" (Rumbel, Tingstad) – 3:55
4. "Deep in My Soul" (Rumbel, Tingstad) – 3:37
5. "Empire Builder" (Rumbel, Tingstad) – 3:56
6. "Clear Moon, Quiet Winds" (Rumbel, Tingstad) – 3:43
7. "Prairie Schooner" (Rumbel, Tingstad) – 4:07
8. "Les Jardins de Nohant" (Rumbel) – 4:00
9. "Havana" (Rumbel, Tingstad) – 3:40
10. "San Antonio" (Rumbel) – 4:05
11. "Drayton Hall" (Rumbel) – 3:53
12. "Windows on the World" (Rumbel, Tingstad) – 4:40
13. "Talk of Angels" (Tingstad) – 3:09

== Personnel ==
- Les Kahn – engineering
- Nancy Rumbel – production, woodwind
- Eric Tingstad – engineering, acoustic guitar, production

== Charts ==
Chart	Peak position
US Billboard Top New Age Albums	11
