= Mind's Eye (film series) =

1990s CGI showcase films

The Mind's Eye series consists of several art films rendered using computer-generated imagery of varying levels of sophistication, with original music scored note-to-frame. The project was conceived by Steven Churchill. The initial Mind's Eye video was directed, conceptualized, edited and co-produced by Jan Nickman of Miramar Productions and co-produced by Steven Churchill of Odyssey Productions. The first three products in the series were released on VHS (by BMG) and LaserDisc (by Image Entertainment). The second and third programs in the series were also released on DVD (by Simitar Entertainment), while the fourth program was released and distributed by Sony Music exclusively on DVD.

== Overview ==
The typical entry in the Mind's Eye series is a short package film, usually 50 to 60 minutes long, with an electronic music soundtrack over a series of music video-like sequences. The original film, titled The Mind's Eye: A Computer Animation Odyssey, by director and co-producer Jan Nickman and producer Steven Churchill, consisted of a non-rigid structure of many semi-related sequences. The general style which characterizes the series is light and cartoonish, due to the difficulty of rendering more complicated images using the computers of the day.

The computer animation sequences that appeared in the films were generally not produced specifically for the Mind's Eye series but rather were work originally created for other purposes, including demo reels, commercials, music videos, and feature films. Nickman then assembled these sequences into a narrative through creative editing, which resulted in a double platinum selling film considered to be a milestone in the field of computer animation. As a result, The Mind's Eye: A Computer Animation Odyssey reached No. 12 on Billboard's video hits chart. This approach gave Churchill access to the best-quality computer graphics of the time without having to bear their substantial production costs.

The soundtracks for the films were composed by James Reynolds, Jan Hammer, Thomas Dolby and Kerry Livgren (founder and guitarist for Kansas).

== Films ==
Title	Release date	Distributor	Director	Producer(s)	Composer	Details	Segments
The Mind's Eye: A Computer Animation Odyssey	January 1, 1990	Miramar Images, Inc.	Jan Nickman	Steven Churchill; Jan Nickman	James Reynolds	Serves as a demonstration of computer animation when the artform was still in its relative infancy. The sales of this video were RIAA-certified as "Multi-Platinum" and reached as high as No. 12 on Billboard's video sales chart.	"Creation" "Civilization Rising"; The technological advances of humanity from the advent of agriculture to the future exploration of the cosmos A segment of what might be the next sentient species to arise on Earth; Stanley and Stella in: Breaking the Ice
Beyond the Mind's Eye	December 23, 1992	Miramar Images, Inc.	Michael Boydstun	Steven Churchill	Jan Hammer	Some scenes were originally created for the 1983 Simutrek arcade lasergame Cube Quest. Video sales were RIAA-certified as "Multi-Platinum" and reached as high as No. 8 on Billboard's video sales chart.	"Too Far" "Seeds of Life", a sequence themed around planet-colonizing seeds, featuring the noted Panspermia by computer graphics artist Karl Sims; CGI sequences from The Lawnmower Man (1992); The DVD version includes both the vocal version of "Seeds of Life" (sung by Chris Thompson) that blends the animation segment and footage of Hammer and his "band" performing (composed of four Jan Hammers) and an instrumental.
The Gate to the Mind's Eye	June 30, 1994	Odyssey Productions	Michael Boydstun	Steven Churchill	Thomas Dolby		"Armageddon", a sequence depicting massive devastation "Neo", an astronomy-themed song "Valley of the Mind's Eye", a song about the progress of human technology "Nuvogue", the series' first jazz track "Quantum Mechanic", starring guest vocalist Dr. Fiorella Terenzi "Delirium Tremendus" "God and the Quantum" "Synchronicity", produced and conceptualized by visionary artist Beny Tchaicovsky.
Odyssey Into the Mind's Eye	July 12, 1996	Odyssey Productions	Michael Boydstun	Steven Churchill	Kerry Livgren	Features two vocal tracks: "One Dark World" (sung by Darren Rogers) and "Aspen Moon" (sung by Livgren's nephew Jacob).	CGI sequences from Ecco: The Tides of Time (1994), Johnny Mnemonic (1995) and Cyberscape, a 45 minute computer animation produced and copyrighted by Tchaicovsky.

== Spin-off titles and other releases ==
Title	Release date	Distributor
Virtual Nature: A Computer Generated Visual Odyssey From the Makers of the Mind's Eye	1993	Odyssey Visual Design
The Mind's Eye Presents Luminous Visions	April 24, 1998	Odyssey Productions
The Mind's Eye Presents Ancient Alien	July 10, 1998	Odyssey Productions
The Mind's Eye Presents Little Bytes	July 25, 2000	Odyssey Productions

Two other anthologies released by Churchill did not include the term "The Mind's Eye" as part of their titles and are thus not considered to be part of the series.

Title	Release date	Distributor
Imaginaria	December 21, 1993	Odyssey Visual Design
Turbulence	March 16, 1996	Odyssey Productions

Churchill's most recent releases have been entries in the eight part Computer Animation series.

Title	Release date	Distributor	Note
Computer Animation Festival Volume 1.0	November 5, 1993	Odyssey Visual Design	
Computer Animation Festival Volume 2.0	September 2, 1994	Odyssey Visual Design	
Computer Animation Festival Volume 3.0	July 12, 1996	Odyssey Productions	
The Mind's Eye Presents Computer Animation Classics	May 6, 1997	Odyssey Productions	
The Mind's Eye Presents Computer Animation Showcase	August 29, 1997	Odyssey Productions	
The Mind's Eye Presents Computer Animation Celebration	May 1, 1998	Odyssey Productions	
Computer Animation Marvels	July 23, 1999	Odyssey Productions	
Computer Animation Extravaganza	August 18, 2000	Odyssey Productions	

A second sister series obliquely referencing Computer Animation is formed by the original Mind's Eye video and Cyberscape: A Computer Animation Vision (August 28, 1997, co-produced by Zoe Productions and Odyssey Productions), a surreal animation chronicling the evolution of human life and thought, by Beny Tchaicovsky.

== Reception and adaptations ==
Beyond the Mind's Eye was a bestseller in the US when it was originally released on VHS and LaserDisc. Roger Ebert selected it as his "Video Pick of the Week" for the week of December 23, 1992 on the TV series Siskel & Ebert.

Several excerpts from The Mind's Eye were seen in the 1992 sci-fi horror film The Lawnmower Man, which itself was featured in Beyond the Mind's Eye. The Mind's Eye and Beyond the Mind's Eye were both integral components in YTV's Short Circutz segments that aired between programs in the 1990s. Canadian independent television station NTV airs excerpts from the first three Mind's Eye videos as part of their "Computer Animated Art Festivals" that run overnight on Fridays.

Pantera covered the song "Planet Caravan", originally by Black Sabbath, on their 1994 album Far Beyond Driven. The music video for this song features scenes from Beyond the Mind's Eye.
