= Indian Summer (Friedemann album) =

Studio album by Friedemann
- Released: 1987
- Genre: New Age
- Length: 43:59
- Label: Narada Equinox
- Producer: Friedemann & Johannes Wohlleben

Friedemann chronology
Goun & Friedemann - Les Oiseaux De Nuit (1985)	Indian Summer (1987)	Serah & Friedemann - Flight Of The Stork (1988)

Professional ratings
Review scores
Source	Rating
Allmusic	4/5 stars

Indian Summer is the fifth solo album and North American debut by Friedemann, released in 1987.

== Track listing ==
All tracks are written by Friedemann, unless otherwise noted.

Side 1
No.	Title	Writer(s)	Length
1.	"Sunshower"		2:48
2.	"The Eye of the Dragonfly"		3:50
3.	"Sentimental Elegance"		3:18
4.	"Sourdos"	Emmanuel Séjourné	3:09
5.	"Indian Summer"	Friedemann; Johannes Wohlleben	7:27

Side 2
No.	Title	Writer(s)	Length
6.	"He Who Walks Alone"		4:09
7.	"Flight of the Heron"		6:09
8.	"Lichterloh"	Friedemann; Johannes Wohlleben	4:26
9.	"Kuterevka"		4:01
10.	"November Winds"		4:42
Total length:			43:59

== Musicians ==
- Friedemann: Bass, Electric Bass, Composer, Guitar, Acoustic Guitar, Electric Guitar, Harp, Keyboards, Percussion, Vocals, Voices
- Johannes Wohlleben: Dulcimer, Hammer Dulcimer, Keyboards, Piano
- Philippe Geiss: Soprano Saxophone, Shaker
- Detlef Engelhard: Trumpets
- Büdi Siebert: Alto Saxophone, Chinese Flute, Zamponas, Tambourine
- Emmanuel Séjourné: Vibraphone, Marimba, Castanets
- Simon Pomaret: Darbouka, Handclaps
- Anne Haigis: Voices
- John Seydewitz: Percussion
- David Arkenstone: Emulator II

== Production ==
- Friedemann: Producer
- Johannes Wohlleben: Producer, Engineer
- Eric Lindert: Executive Producer, Design
- Dave Vartanian: Additional Engineering
- R. Hamilton Smith: Cover insert photo
- Shinzo Maeda: Cover background photo
- Pohlman Studios: Artist photo
- James Wagner: Design
- Jerry Munley: Design
- John Morey: Design

All track information and credits were taken from the LP liner notes.
