= Eric Tingstad =

American songwriter

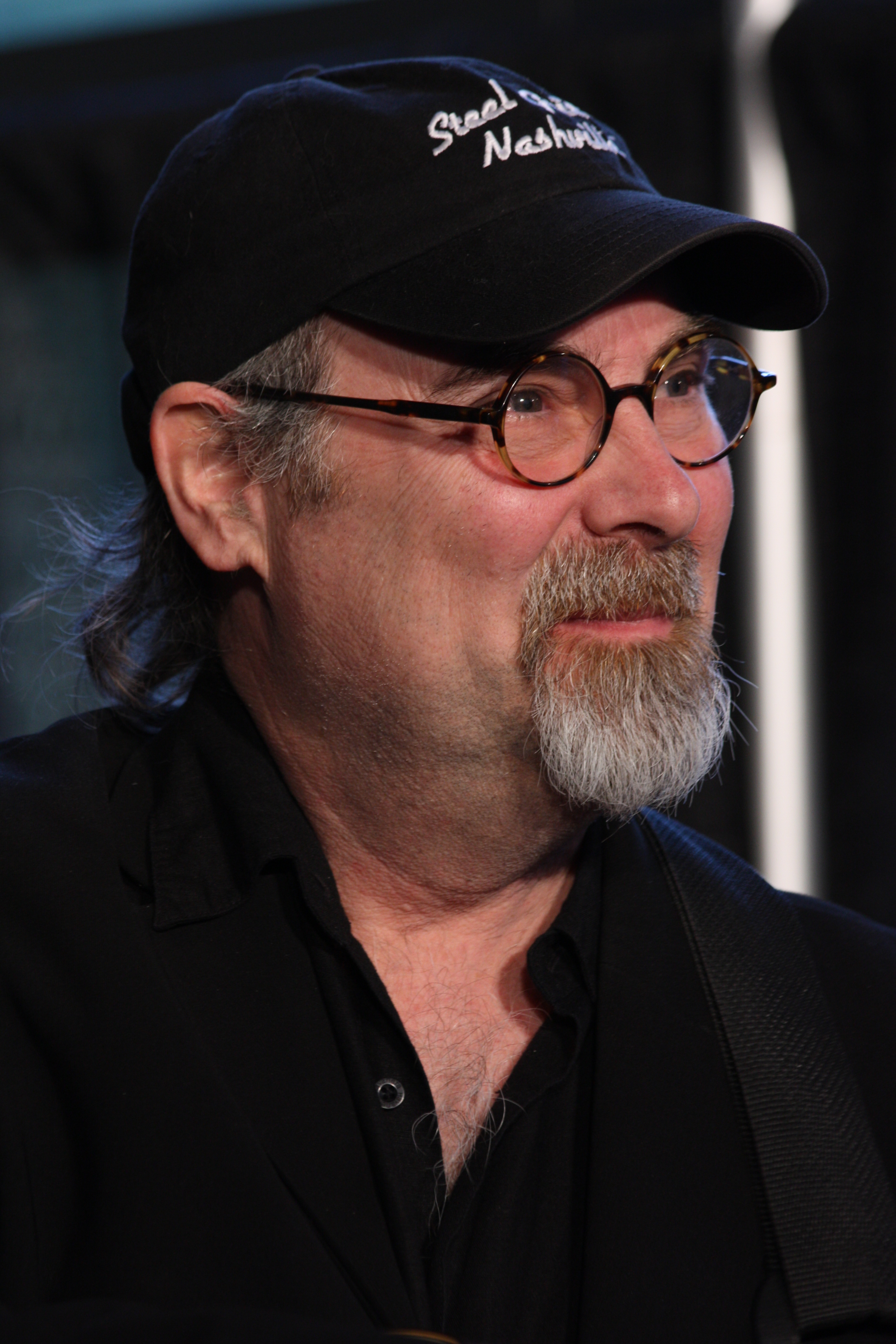

Background information
- Born: December 16, 1954 (age 71); Seattle, Washington, U.S.
- Genres: New-age, ambient, roots rock
- Occupation: Musician
- Instrument: Guitar
- Years active: 1981–present
- Labels: Narada, Cheshire
- Member of: Tingstad and Rumbel
- Website: www.erictingstad.com

Eric Tingstad (born December 16, 1954) is an American record producer, musician, songwriter and composer. He was born and raised in Seattle, Washington. Best known as a fingerstyle guitarist, Tingstad has performed, recorded, and produced alternative country, blues, americana, rock, smooth jazz, ambient, and New-age music. Tingstad frequently collaborates with woodwinds player Nancy Rumbel as Tingstad and Rumbel.

== Background ==
Eric Tingstad cites early rock and roll influences such as the Beatles, Led Zeppelin, and King Crimson. Other influences include The Kingston Trio, Flatt and Scruggs, pianist and composer Martin Denny, sitar virtuoso Ravi Shankar, Mason Williams's "Classical Gas" and the Hawaiian slack-key guitar.

In the mid 1970s, while playing lead guitar and bass with Seattle-based rock band Pegasus, Tingstad began studies under masters of techniques pioneered by Spanish classical guitarist and innovator Andrés Segovia. Those techniques, combined with innovations of his own, have shaped Tingstad's stylings and the instrumental compositions for which he is known. His innovative work inspired Will Ackerman, founder of Windham Hill Records, to create the Windham Hill Guitar Sampler series. Tingstad's Prelude from the Bridal Suite is a selected pick on AllMusic.com from the first Windham Hill Guitar Sampler.

By a vote of his peers, he was honored in October 2006 with the Coyote Award from Arts Northwest commemorating his leadership, visibility, and contributions in live performance. He is also known for his philanthropic and community service work for historical preservation, land trust, and environmental issues which he has incorporated into his compositional themes and branding.

== Recordings ==
Tingstad's solo recording career began in 1982 with the release of On the Links, eleven original songs in the then-burgeoning New Age genre. The album appeared on his private label, Cheshire Records, under which he continues to release albums of his own music and others.

In 1985, he began a collaboration with woodwinds player Nancy Rumbel. Their debut album, The Gift, an acoustic Christmas collection, was very well received, selling ten thousand copies in the first ten weeks. The Gift went on to sell over half a million copies, and remains a best-selling Christmas album.

In 1987 Tingstad signed a multi-album record contract with Narada Productions which led to 14 recordings from 1987 to 2004. The catalog is now owned and distributed worldwide by EMI Capitol. In 1988 Tingstad and Rumbel collaborated with pianist David Lanz to form the Woodlands trio, which resulted in a best-selling album called Woodlands.

In 1998 the double album, American Acoustic was honored as "Acoustic Instrumental Album of the Year". It debuted at number one on Adult Contemporary charts and spent ten weeks on the Billboard radio charts. In 2000, Tingstad & Rumbel were invited to perform at Carnegie Hall.

Tingstad won a Grammy Award for Best New Age Album in 2003 as artist, engineer, and producer of Tingstad and Rumbel's, Acoustic Garden.

In 2007 Tingstad recorded Southwest, an instrumental album inspired by the landscapes of the American Southwest region featuring compositions in the style of what he calls "Ambient-Americana". He received a Grammy nomination for the recording Southwest recording.

In 2012 he released his instrumental Americana recording Badlands, which includes an appearance by dobro and steel guitarist Cindy Cashdollar. Badlands continues in the ambient-Americana style, deriving influence from Native American music, along with country and roots genres.

On April 21, 2015 Tingstad released another instrumental called Mississippi continuing in the realm of Americana, folk, blues, country and more with Chris Leighton, Ben Smith and TJ Morris on drums and percussion, Eric Robert on organ and whirly, and Garey Shelton and James Clark on bass.

== Discography ==
- On the Links (1982)
- Urban Guitar (1984)
- The Gift (1985)
- Emerald (1986)
- Woodlands (1987)
- Legends (1988)
- Homeland (1990)
- In the Garden (1991)
- Renewal (1992)
- Give and Take (1993)
- Star of Wonder (1994)
- A Sense of Place (1995)
- Pastorale (1997)
- American Acoustic (1998)
- Music to Brighten Your World (2000)
- Paradise (2000)
- A Dream and a Wish (2001)
- Acoustic Garden (2002)
- A Trip Through Tuscany (2003)
- Comfort and Joy (2004)
- A Moments Peace (2005)
- Southwest (2006)
- Leap of Faith (2009)
- Fortune Smiles (The Halyards) (2010)
- Badlands (2012)
- Mississippi (2015)
- Electric Spirit (2018)
