= Richard Smith (English guitarist) =

English guitarist (born 1971)

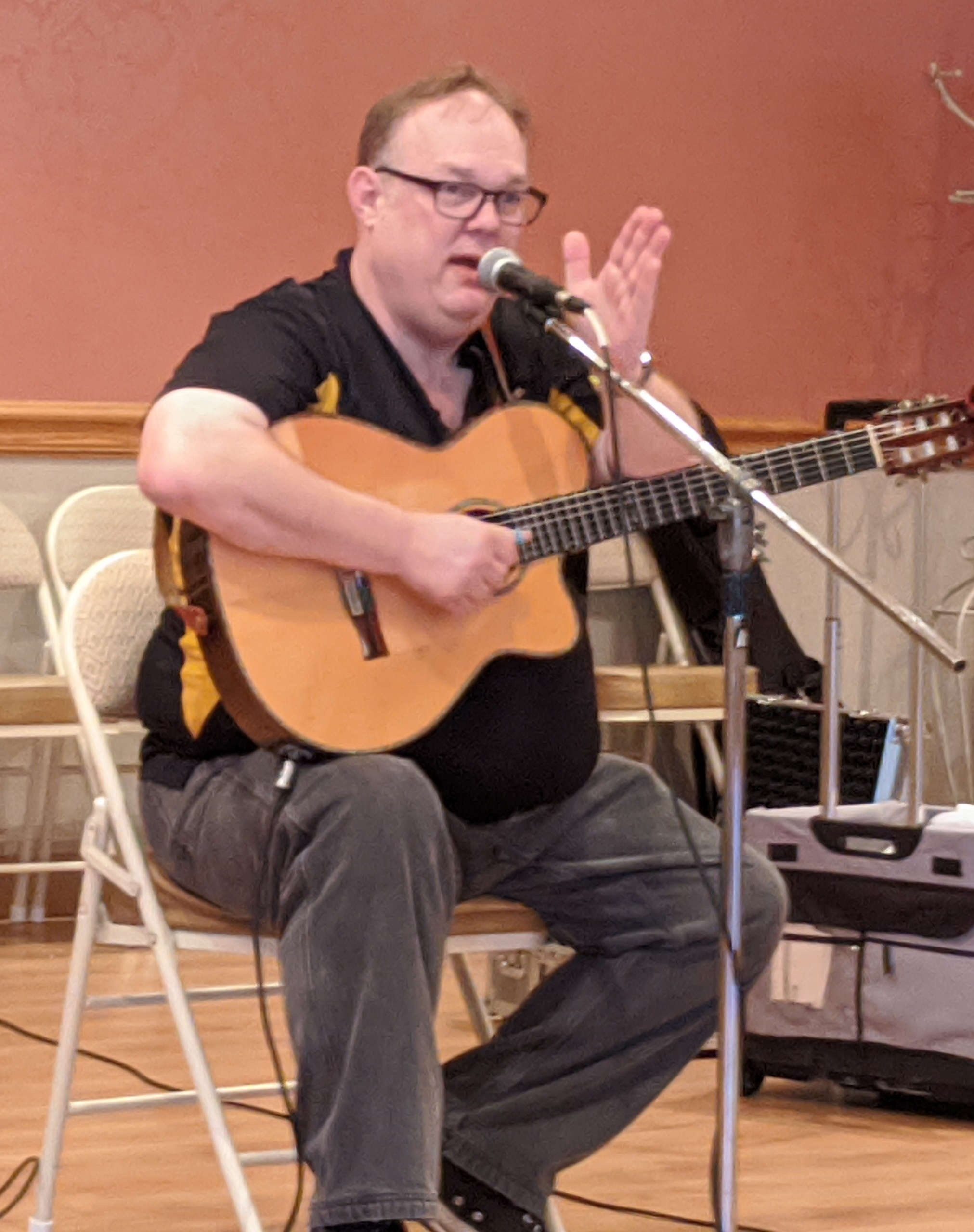
- Smith at a 2021 event in The Villages, Florida.

Background information
- Born: 12 December 1971 (age 54); Beckenham, England
- Origin: Nashville, Tennessee
- Genres: Country, bluegrass, gypsy jazz, western swing, classical, folk
- Occupation: Musician
- Instrument: Guitar
- Website: richardsmithmusic.com

Richard Smith (born 12 December 1971) is an English guitarist.

== Biography ==
Smith was born in Beckenham, England. He picked up the guitar when he was five years old after watching his father playing an Atkins and Travis version of "Down South Blues". He begged his father, a longtime Atkins admirer, to introduce him to the fingerpicking style. Smith soon became a child prodigy on the guitar. As a kid he could play the entire discographies of Django Reinhardt and Chet Atkins. At the age of 11 he shared the stage with his idol when Atkins invited Smith to play with him at Her Majesty's Theatre in London. He was also influenced by guitarist Big Jim Sullivan and briefly studied jazz guitar with Shane Hill at Warlingham School, Surrey.

He formed the Richard Smith Guitar Trio with his brothers Rob and Sam before marrying American cellist Julie Adams and moving to Nashville, Tennessee in 1999. He founded the Hot Club of Nashville, a jam band with a varying lineup that included John Jorgenson, Pat Bergeson, Bryan Sutton, and Stuart Duncan, combining gypsy jazz and western swing. Smith performs as a solo act and a duo with his wife. His repertoire includes country, bluegrass, blues, ragtime, folk, jazz, pop, and classical music.

== Gear ==
Smith plays a signature instrument made by luthier Kirk Sand from Laguna Beach, California. The Richard Smith Model is an acoustic-electric nylon-string guitar. He also endorses steel-string models by Stonebridge Guitars. He prefers German-built AER amplifiers for his guitars. Richard uses D'Addario strings and accessories.

== Awards and honors ==
Smith won the National Fingerstyle Guitar Championship at the Walnut Valley Festival in Winfield, Kansas in 2001. The National Thumbpickers Hall of Fame named him Thumbpicker of the Year in 2008 and 2021 and inducted him into the Hall of Fame in 2009. He received the Golden Thumbpick Award by the Association of Fingerstyle Guitarists.

== Discography ==
Solo:

- 2002: Requests
- 2006: Fingerstyle Artistry (Mel Bay DVD)
- 2007: Slim Pickin'
- 2014: Mastering Thumbpicking with Richard Smith (Homespun Music Instruction DVD)
- 2017: One Man Roadshow

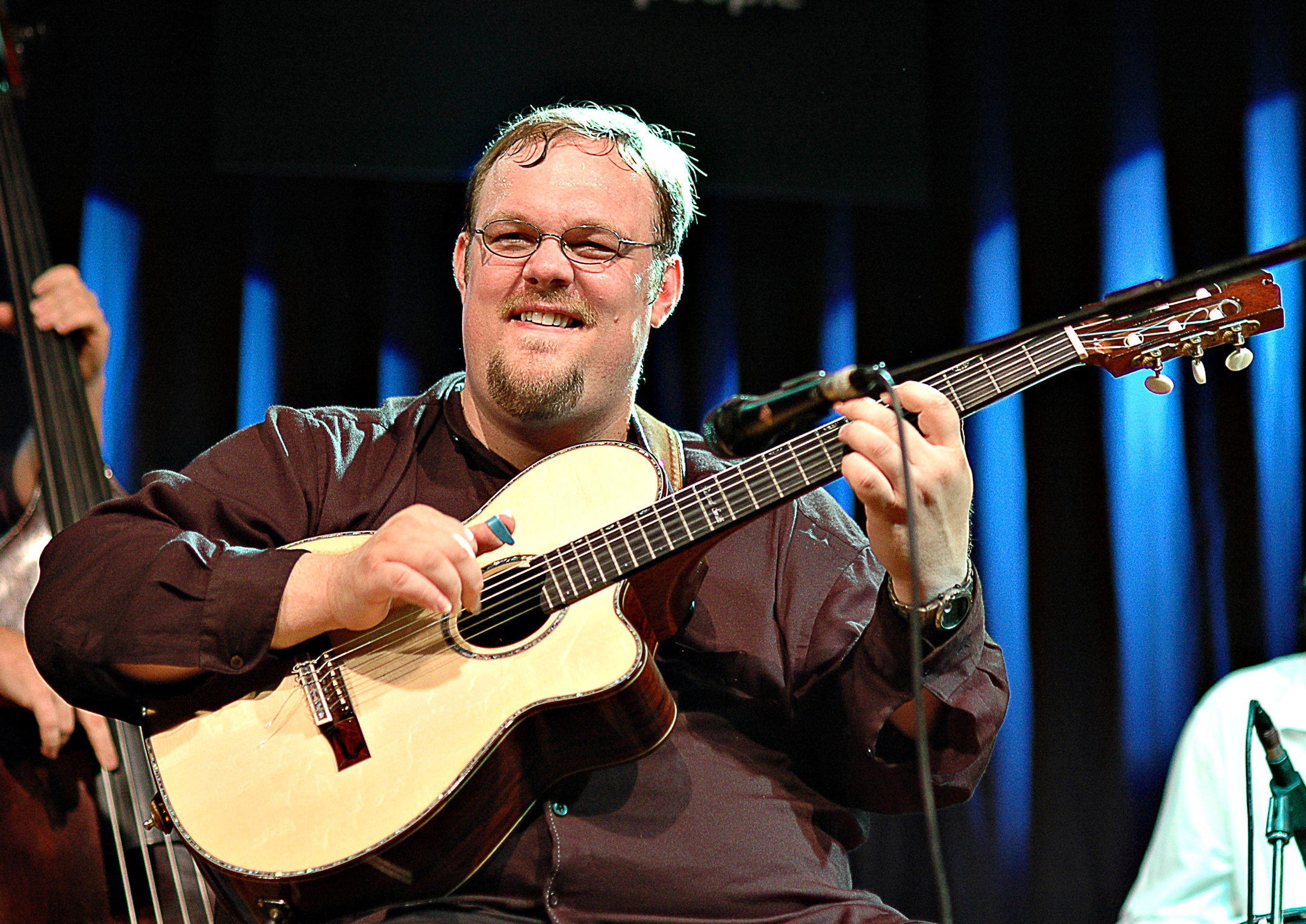
Smith performing in Germany in 2006

With The Richard Smith Guitar Trio:

- 1996: The Richard Smith Guitar Trio
- 1997: Welcome to Smithville
- 1998: Strike it Rich!
- 1999: Out of Bounds

With Jim Nichols

- 2003: Live at Boulevard Music

With Julie Adams

- 2001: Living Out a Dream
- 2009: Seems Like Old Times

With Aaron Till

- 2004: Out of Nowhere

With Joscho Stephan:

- 2007: Live in Concert (Acoustic Music Records DVD, special guest appearance)

With Joscho Stephan: & Rory Hoffman:

- Transatlantic Guitar Trio
