= Peter Autschbach =

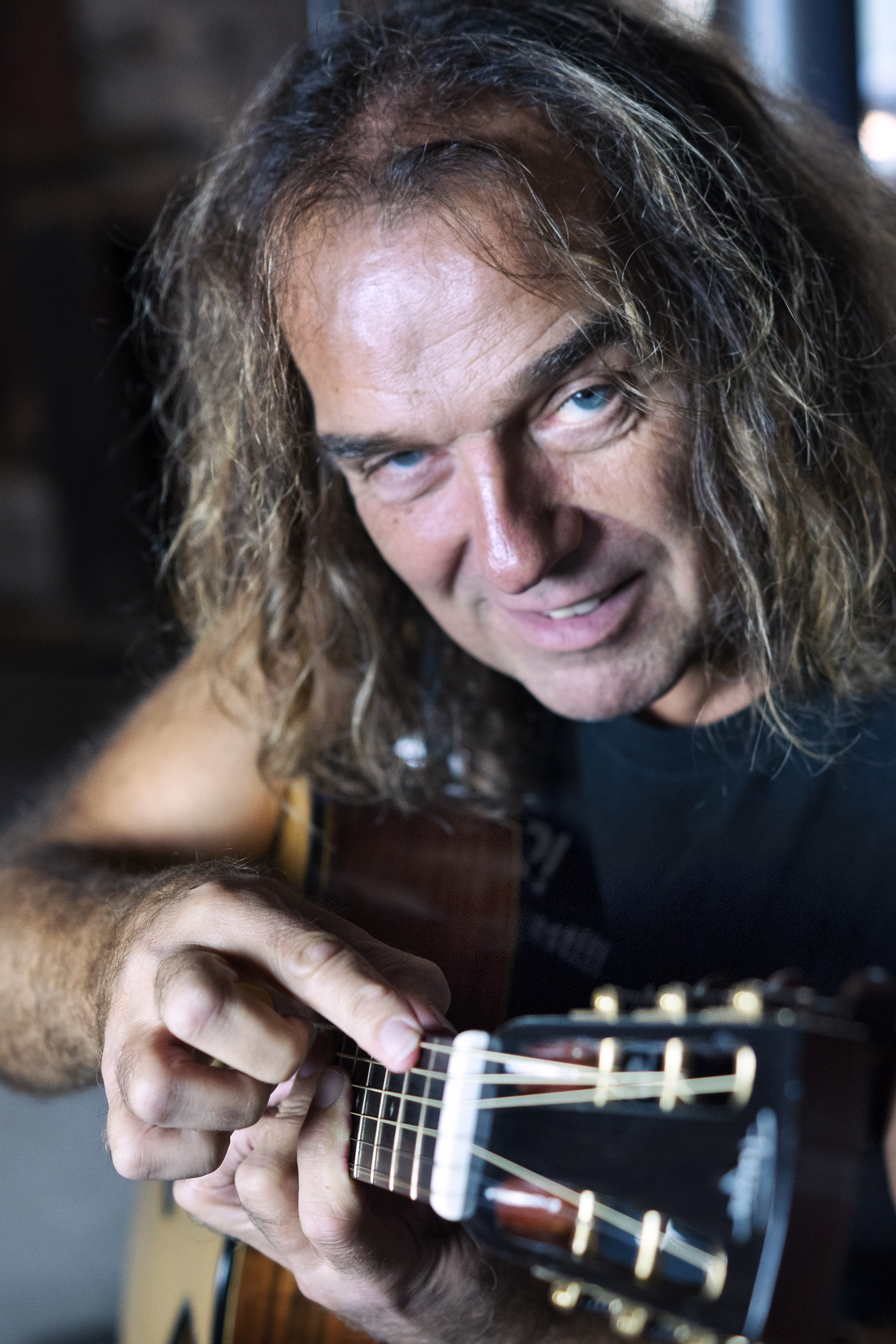

Background information
- Born: 19 September 1961 (age 64); Siegen, West Germany
- Genres: Fingerstyle acoustic; rock; jazz
- Occupations: Composer, musician
- Instrument: Guitar
- Years active: 1976–present
- Labels: Acoustic Music Records, Germany, Da Vinci, Japan
- Website: autschbach.de

Peter Autschbach (born 1961 in Siegen, West Germany) is a German composer, guitarist and music teacher.

== Biography ==
Peter Autschbach learned to play the guitar being autodidact, in 1988/89 he was a private student of jazz guitarist Joe Pass. In 1990, he completed his jazz studies at the Cologne Musikhochschule with highest honors. He joined the band of the rock opera Tommy written by Pete Townshend, he played about 1,000 shows between 1995 and 2005. He also worked for the Dortmund Philharmonic Orchestra being guitarist in various musicals such as Cabaret (2002) and West Side Story (2004). Later he was chosen by Brian May to be a guitarist in the Queen show "We Will Rock You" in Cologne and Vienna. Since 1998, Autschbach composes for his band Terminal A, touring in Germany and abroad. Autschbach released nineteen albums with his original compositions. Since 2010, he started a duo with guitarist Ralf Illenberger, who is living in Sedona, Arizona. So far they released three albums, No Boundaries, One Mind and Zero Gravity. In 2013, the US guitar manufacturer Larrivée developed a new electric guitar called the "Autschbach Model". Also the German luthier Joe Striebel honored Autschbach with four different signature series. Autschbach is also endorsed by G66, the European distributor of Fractal Audio equipment. As a solo guitarist and interpreter of his fingerstyle compositions, Autschbach was invited to play in Singapore (2011) and Japan (2014). Autschbach's album Begin At The End was released by Da Vinci Edition, Osaka, Japan in April 2018. Since 2009, Autschbach has been working in a duo with the female singer Samira Saygili. Their first joint album Sweeter Than Honey, was released on 9 November 2018 by Acoustic Music Records. The duo was invited by the German fingerstyle guitarist Peter Finger to join the "International Guitar Night" tour in 2011 and 2018. On December 14, 2019, Samira Saygili and Peter Autschbach won the first prize in the "Best Singer" category and an award in the special category "Best Guitarist" with the song "Holobiont" (music: Peter Autschbach, lyrics: Samira Saygili) at the event "Deutscher Rock und Pop Preis" (German Rock and Pop prize). In 2020 Joscho Stephan and Autschbach started to perform as a duo. Their joint album "Sundowner" was released March 2021.
In May 2023 the album TA2 by Autschbach's band TA2 was released on CD and on digital platforms. It includes nine originals, a cover of the song "Love Games" by the band Level 42 and a rendition of the Hendrix-classic "Little Wing".
Since 2025, Autschbach is operating an e-learning platform on the subject of Jazz guitar in German and English languages.

== Textbook author and music teacher ==
Since 1990 Autschbach teaches at the music school Lennestadt, conducts guitar workshops in Germany, Europe and Asia and he wrote eighteen guitar teaching books. He developed new didactic approaches that are used by many teachers such as the electric guitar method "Let's Rock" and the two-volume acoustic guitar book "Rock On Wood". The textbook "Gitarre lernen mit Zacky und Bob" for children aged eight and over, published by Schott Music in 2016, teaches playing on the entire fretboard right from the start, so that the guitar can be experienced as a whole. Autschbach composed 90 easy-to-play guitar pieces for this two-volume work. The homepage relating to the books features explanatory videos for each piece. Since 1999, Peter Autschbach writes compositions for the magazine "Akustik Gitarre", which are printed in the column "Fingerstyle Jazz". Since 2011 he conducts video-workshops like "Acoustic Rock" and "Guitar Hero" in the workshop magazine "Acoustic Player".

== Composer ==
Autschbach's compositions make up a large part of his work. He developed his musical language over decades, picking up elements of Jazz, Blues, Rock and Latin American music. Unexpected modulations and changes in rhythm cause surprises, yet the music with its singable melodies always stays tonal, thus allowing less experienced listeners to be able to understand and appreciate his music. Autschbach's interpretations of well-known songs are integrated in this recognizable style of composition by using reharmonization and often a new rhythmic approach.

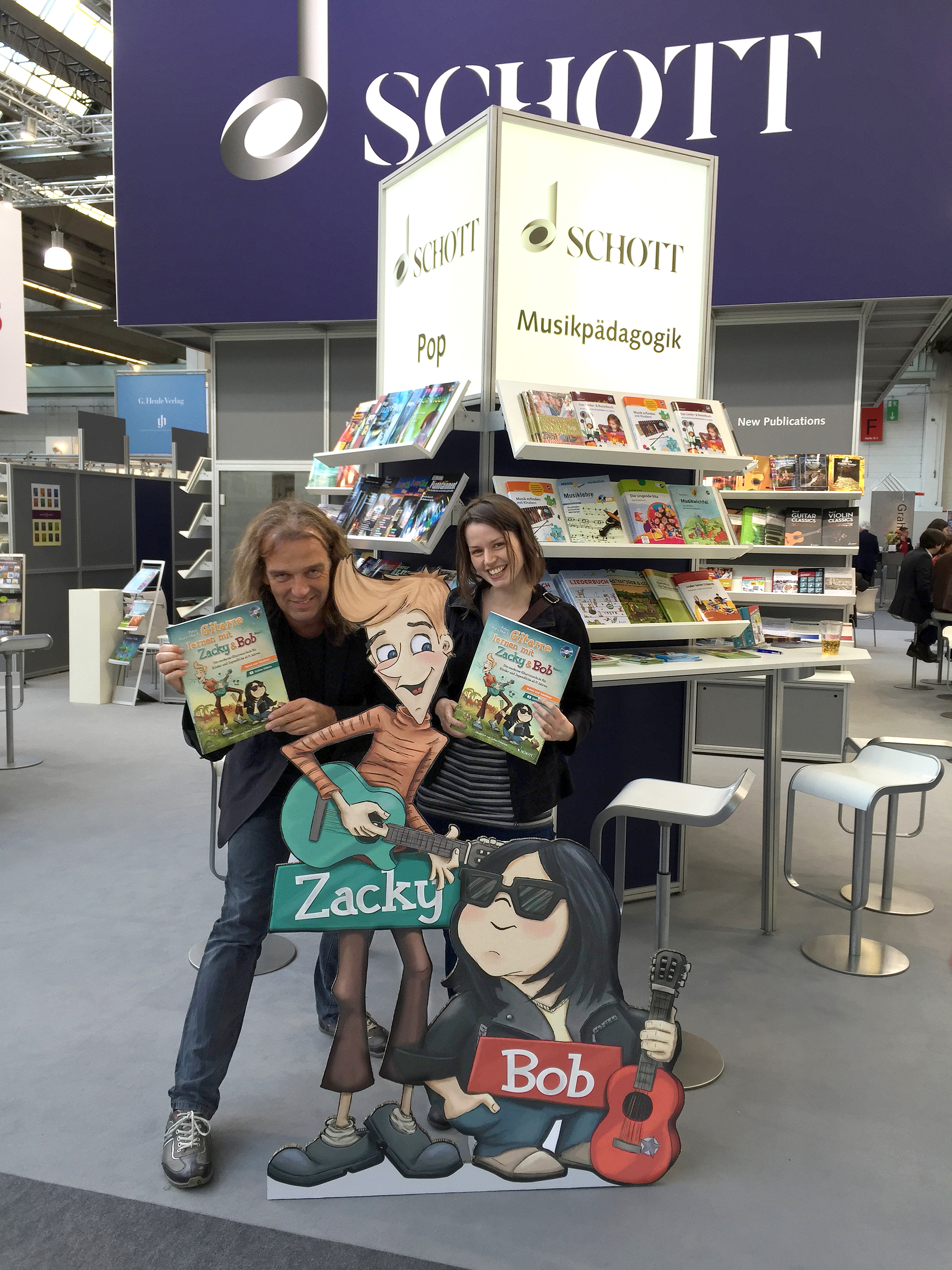
Peter Autschbach introducing Zacky and Bob with illustrator Selina Peterson

== Teaching books for guitar ==
- 2001 Gitarre Pur Band 1, stilübergreifendes Lehrmaterial, Lehrbuch mit CD, Acoustic Music Books
- 2003 Gitarre Pur Band 2, stilübergreifendes Lehrmaterial, Lehrbuch mit CD, Acoustic Music Books
- 2008 Let's Rock, E-Gitarrenschule, Lehrbuch mit CD, Acoustic Music Books
- 2009 Improvisation Vol. 1, Lehrbuch mit DVD, Fingerprint
- 2009 Improvisation Vol. 2, Lehrbuch mit DVD, Fingerprint
- 2010 On Stage, Autschbach original compositions with CD, Acoustic Music Books
- 2011 Rock on Wood Band 1, Lehrbuch für Akustik-Rock mit CD, Acoustic Music Books
- 2011 Best of Martin Kolbe + Ralf Illenberger, Compositions for 2 guitars, Acoustic Music Books
- 2011 Theorie-Basics für Gitarristen Vol.1, Harmonielehre ohne Noten, Fingerprint
- 2011 Theorie-Basics für Gitarristen Vol.2, Harmonielehre ohne Noten, Fingerprint
- 2012 All in One – Rock Guitar Solos, Acoustic Music Books
- 2013 All in One – Blues Guitar Solos, Acoustic Music Books
- 2015 Rock on Wood Band 2, Lehrbuch für Akustik-Rock mit CD, Acoustic Music Books
- 2016 Gitarre lernen mit Zacky und Bob Band 1, Gitarrenlehrbuch für Kinder, Schott Music
- 2017 Gitarre lernen mit Zacky und Bob Band 2, Gitarrenlehrbuch für Kinder, Schott Music
- 2018 Meine Lieblingsstücke, Autschbach original compositions with CD, Fingerprint
- 2019 Das Songbuch von Zacky und Bob, Schott Music
- 2020 Ü40, 20 Killersongs for guitar Schott Music
- 2021 Jazzgitarrenbu.ch, Jazz guitar teaching method Schott Music
- 2023 E-Gitarre lernen mit Zacky und Bob, Video-Guitar-Method for teaching children from the age of 6 years, Schott Music

== Discography (excerpt) ==
- 1998 Chasing the Beat (CD)
- 2000 Under The Surface (CD)
- 2002 Feelin' Dunk (CD) feat. Barbara Dennerlein - Hammond Organ
- 2004 Pass It on (CD) (A Tribute to Joe Pass)
- 2006 Transcontinental (CD) Peter Autschbach's Terminal A
- 2009 Summer Breeze (CD)
- 2012 No Boundaries (CD) Peter Autschbach & Ralf Illenberger
- 2014 You and Me (CD)
- 2014 Songs From the Inside (CD) with Martin Kolbe
- 2014 One Mind (CD) Peter Autschbach & Ralf Illenberger
- 2017 Slow Motion (CD)
- 2017 Wir sind Demokratie (CD) Peter Autschbach
- 2017 Zero Gravity (CD) Peter Autschbach & Ralf Illenberger
- 2018 Begin At The End (CD) Peter Autschbach
- 2018 Sweeter Than Honey (CD) Samira Saygili & Peter Autschbach
- 2021 Sundowner (CD and Vinyl-LP) Joscho Stephan & Peter Autschbach
- 2021 Sing! (CD) Samira Saygili & Peter Autschbach
- 2023 TA2 (CD) Peter Autschbach's TA2
- 2024 Reflections (CD and Vinyl-LP)
