= Michael Jones (Canadian musician) =

Canadian new-age pianist and composer (1942–2022)

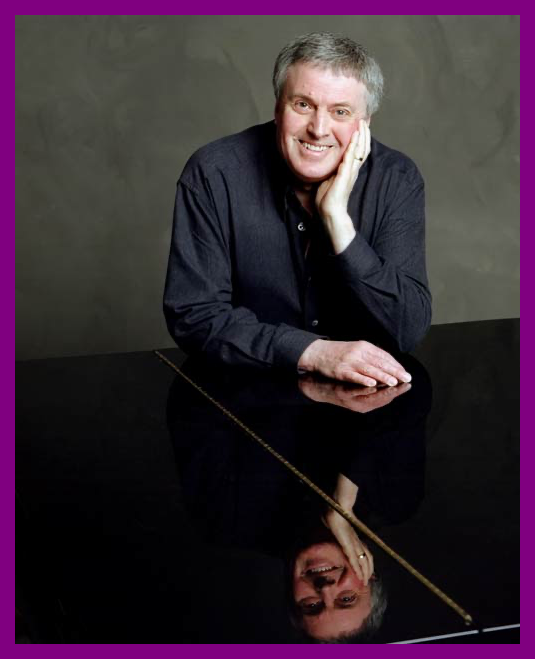

Background information
- Born: 1942
- Died: 19 January 2022 (aged 79)
- Genres: New-age
- Occupations: Composer, Pianist, Author, Lecturer
- Instrument: Piano
- Years active: c. 1980–2022
- Labels: Pianoscapes, Inc. Narada
- Website: www.pianoscapes.com,

Michael Jones (1942 – 19 January 2022) was a British-born Canadian new-age pianist and composer, known for his improvisational new age performance style. He was also a writer and leadership educator.

== Personal life ==
Jones was born in Surrey, England, and grew up in Kitchener and later Queenston, Ontario. He died on 19 January 2022, at the age of 79 at Mariposa House Hospice in Orillia, Ontario.

== Career ==
Jones' first album, Pianoscapes, was released on the newly formed Narada record label. The album sold more than 100,000 copies. Since then he has released more than a dozen albums of piano music. In 1990 he conducted a concert tour.

He published three books about creative leadership; the most recent is The Soul of Place: Re-imagining Leadership Through Nature Art and Community. Jones was a columnist for the business and leadership website, Management - Issues. He often combined the two sides of his career by performing his compositions at leadership conferences.

In 2015 Jones co-chaired the Mariposa Roundtable, an initiative to improve the economy of Orillia through increased tourism.

== Original discography ==
- Michael's Music (Pianoscapes, 1981)
  - Reissued as Pianoscapes (Narada, 1983)
- Windsong (Antiquity, 1983)
- Seascapes (Narada, 1984)
- Wind and Whispers (Sona Gaia, 1985)
- Solstice (Narada, 1985)
- Sunscapes (Narada, 1986)
- Amber (Narada, 1987)
- After the Rain (Narada, 1988)
- Magical Child (Narada, 1990)
- Michael's Music (Narada, 1990)
- Morning in Medonte (Narada, 1992)
- Air Born (Narada, 1994)
- Touch (Narada, 1996)
- The Living Music (Narada, 1998)
- Echoes of Childhood ( Pianoscapes, 2002)
- Almost Home (Pianoscapes, 2006)
- Deep Song (Pianoscapes, 2015)

== Compilation appearances ==
- The Living Music (Narada 1998)
- 20 Years of Narada Piano
- Grand Piano (Narada Anniversary Collection)
- Pianoscapes The Deluxe Edition (Narada 2002)

== Books ==
- Michael Jones (1 January 1991). Solos and Sketches for New Age Piano. Hal Leonard Publishing Corporation. ISBN 978-0-7935-0059-8.
- Creating an Imaginative Life Trafford (1995, 2006) ISBN 978-1-57324-011-6
- Artful Leadership, Awakening the Commons of the Imagination Trafford (2006) ISBN 1-4120-8578-0
- The Soul of Place:Re-Imagining Leadership Through Nature, Art and Community Friesen Press (2014) ISBN 9781460237960

== See also ==
- List of ambient music artists
