= Billy McLaughlin =

American musician (active 1988– )

- Genres: Fingerstyle guitar, tapping, new age
- Occupations: Musician, composer, producer, public speaker
- Instruments: Guitar, vocals
- Years active: 1988–present
- Labels: Proton Discs, Narada
- Website: www.billymclaughlin.com

Billy McLaughlin is an American new age acoustic guitarist, composer and producer.

== Background ==
McLaughlin, of Irish ancestry, graduated with honors from the music department of the University of Southern California. He is one of nine children.

In 1998, Mclaughlin began noticing symptoms of focal dystonia, a neurological condition which severely limits his ability to play guitar. He began retraining himself to play left-handed, ultimately developing a tapping style holding the neck of the guitar toward his right shoulder. A documentary entitled Changing Keys was made about this phase of his career.

He returned to performing publicly in 2006, both solo and with his band. During his December 2006 concerts with Simple Gifts, the sextet he formed in 2002 to play Christmas music, he performed the hammering style left-handed and more traditional strumming style right-handed, using separate sets of guitars tuned for the manner in which he was playing.

McLaughlin is a voluntary ambassador for the Dystonia Medical Research Foundation.

== Performance ==
McLaughlin has toured around the United States since before 1988, and also performs in Japan and across Europe.

The National Association for Campus Activities has awarded McLaughlin with three National Campus Entertainer of the Year Awards (Jazz) and a Hall of Fame Achievement Award.

== Discography ==
- Billy McLaughlin (1988) Proton Music Publishing
- Inhale Pink (1989) Proton Discs
- The Archery of Guitar (1993) Proton Discs
- Wintersongs & Traditionals (1994) Proton Discs
- Stormseeker – The Best of Billy McLaughlin (1995) Proton Discs
- Fingerdance (1996) Narada
- Out of Hand (1999) Narada
- Acoustic Original: The Best of Billy McLaughlin (2001) Narada
- Guitar Meditations – with Soulfood (2001) Soulfood Music
- A Simple Gift (2002) Proton Discs (Debut release of Simple Gifts)
- Guitar Meditations II – with Soulfood (2005) Soulfood Music
- Into the Light (2007) Proton Discs
- Shepherds & Angels – with Simple Gifts (2007) Proton Discs
- A Small Town Christmas – with Simple Gifts (2009) Proton Discs
- The Star Carol – with Simple Gifts (2010) Proton Discs
- "Winter grace - with Simple Gifts" (2013) Proton Discs
- "This Christmastide - with Simple Gifts" (2016) Proton Discs

=== With The Billy McLaughlin Group ===
- Exhale Blue (1989)
- The Bow and the Arrow (1995)
- Finally! – Live (2002) Proton Discs

=== Compilation appearances ===
- Stories (Narada Artist Collection)
- The Next Generation - Narada Sampler
- Narada Film and Television Music Sampler

== Accolades ==
McLaughlin received the 2010 Public Leadership in Neurology Award from the American Academy of Neurology.

== See also ==
- List of ambient music artists
