= Joscho Stephan =

German jazz guitarist (born 1979)

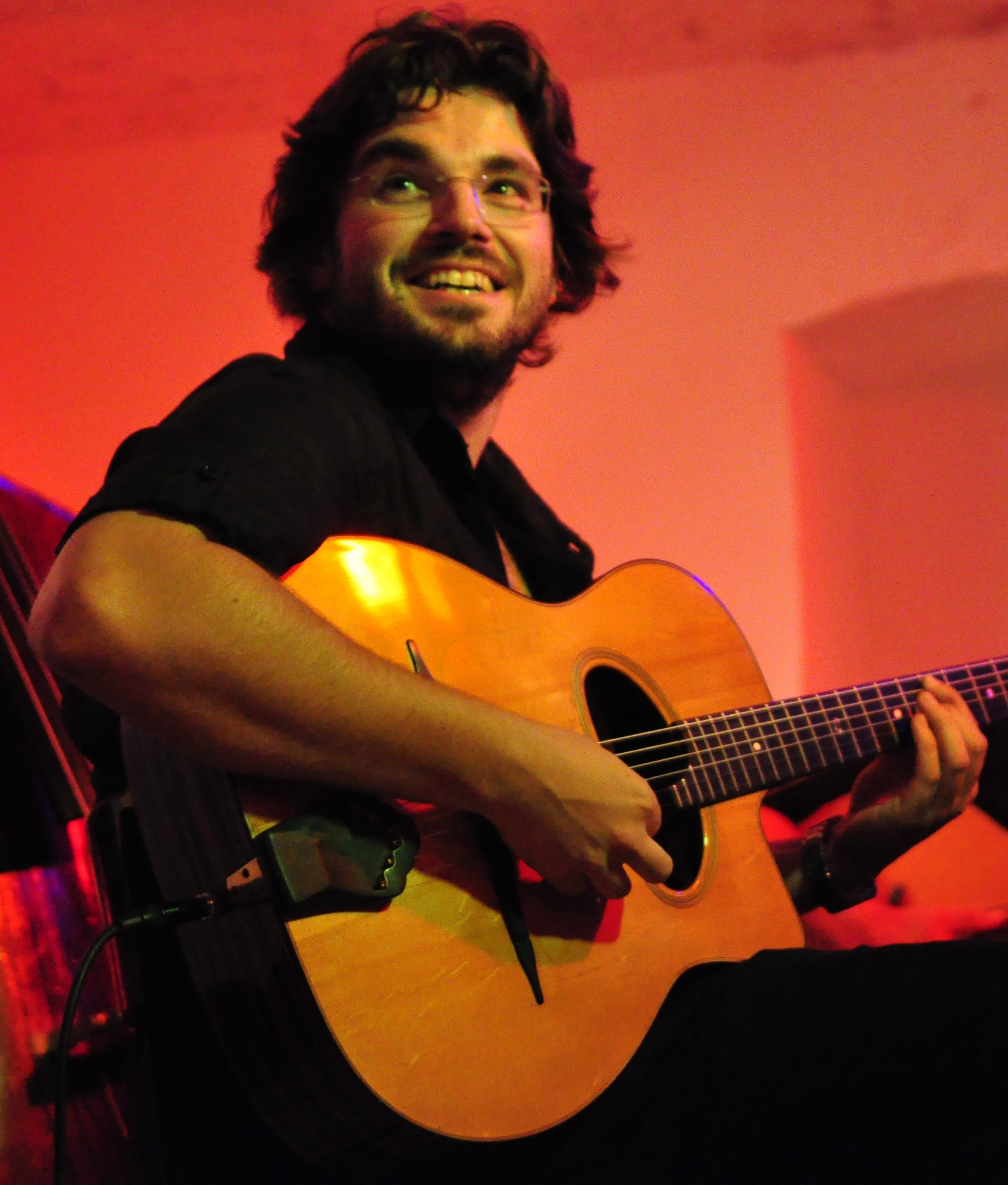
- Joscho Stephan with his Volkert D-hole guitar

Background information
- Born: June 23, 1979 (age 45); Mönchengladbach, West Germany
- Genres: Gypsy jazz
- Occupation: Musician
- Instrument: Guitar
- Website: Official site

Joscho Stephan (born 23 June 1979 in Mönchengladbach, West Germany) is a German jazz guitarist who is known for his interpretation of classical, jazz and pop standards in the style of Gypsy jazz. He began playing the guitar at the age of six, influenced by his father who had been a member of a cover band.

== Discography ==
- Swinging Strings (Acoustic Music Records, 1999)
- Swing News (Acoustic Music, 2001)
- Django Forever (Acoustic Music, 2003)
- Acoustic Live (Acoustic Music, 2006)
- Django Nuevo (Acoustic Music, 2009)
- Live at Satyrblues Fest. 2009 (Tarnobrzeskie Stowarzyszenie Oko, 2010)
- Gypsy Meets the Klezmer (MGL, 2012)
- Joscho Stephan's Acoustic Rhythm (MGL, 2013)
- Joscho Stephan Trio (MGL, 2014)
- Guitar Heroes with Tommy Emmanuel, Stochelo Rosenberg and Biréli Lagrène (MGL, 2015)
- Paris-Berlin (Berliner Meister Schallplatten, 2018)
- Salon 18 (MGL, 2019)
- Transatlantic Guitar Trio with Richard Smith and Rory Hoffman (MGL, 2020)
- Sundowner with Peter Autschbach (Timezone, 2021)
