= Michael Backes =

German professor of computer science

- Born: 7 January 1978 (age 48)

Academic background
- Education: Saarland University
- Thesis: Cryptographically Sound Analysis of Security Protocols (2002)
- Doctoral advisor: Birgit Pfitzmann, Harald Ganzinger

Academic work
- Main interests: formal methods, cryptography and privacy-enhancing technologies
- Website: cispa.saarland/director/

Michael Backes (born 7 January 1978) is a German professor of computer science. He is the founding director and former CEO of the CISPA Helmholtz Center for Information Security. He is known for his work on formal methods, cryptography and privacy-enhancing technologies.

== Life and career ==
Born in Germany, he received a diploma degree in computer science and a diploma degree in mathematics from Saarland University in 2001 and 2002, respectively, and obtained his PhD in computer science from Saarland University in 2002 under the supervision of Birgit Pfitzmann and Harald Ganzinger.

He was successively a researcher at IBM Research (2002 – 2005) and associate professor (2005) and professor (2006 – today) of computer science at Saarland University, Germany.

He is the founding director and CEO of the newly funded CISPA Helmholtz Center for Information Security, Germany, since 2018.

His research is concerned with information security and privacy, particularly on security and privacy in machine learning, trustworthy information processing and medical privacy; design, analysis and verification for security-critical systems and services, and universal solutions in software and network security.

On June 22, 2026, he was suspended from his role as director of CISPA under suspicion of espionage at CISPA by foreign countries. An external review followed which did not find any evidence of espionage. On September 24, he resigned from his role as director of CISPA, with the explanation that his view on how an internationally acting research institution like CISPA should be run in the future differs considerably from the view of the shareholders.

== Awards and honors ==
Backes has received a number of awards, including the following:

- 2004: Caspar Bowden Award 2004
- 2005: IBM Outstanding Achievement Award
- 2007: Fellow of the Max Planck Society
- 2008: IBM Faculty Award
- 2008: MIT TR35
- 2009: European Research Council Starting Grant
- 2014: European Research Council Synergy Grant
- 2015: Member of the German Academy of Science and Engineering
- 2017: CNIL-INRIA Privacy Award
- 2017: NSA Cybersecurity Research Award
- 2018: Fellow of the IEEE
- 2018: Honorary Doctorate degree of the University of Lorraine
- 2023: ACM Fellow
