= Nando Lauria =

Brazilian musician (born 1960)

- Born: 11 May 1960 (age 66); Recife, Brazil
- Genres: Brazilian music, jazz, New Age
- Occupation: Musician
- Instruments: Guitar, vocals
- Years active: 1980s–present
- Label: Narada
- Formerly of: Pat Metheny Group

Nando Lauria (born 11 May 1960) is a Brazilian singer and guitarist.

== Biography ==
At the age of seven, Lauria picked up the violão (Brazilian acoustic guitar). He was raised in a musical family—his older brother played electric guitar in a band. Lauria used to attend his concerts and mimic the playing of his brother's band members on his acoustic guitar. As a youth he listened repeatedly to the music of The Beatles and popular Brazilian musicians of the 1970s. On his own he picked up the elements of music and taught himself to play chords. He learned to improvise and took great pleasure in his musical discoveries.

At the age of 12 he took part in many school productions and was seen on local television and theater. When he was 15, he attended the "Abertura" music festival in Brazil, where he got in touch with the guitar duo Burnier & Cartier. Other musicians at the festival included Milton Nascimento, Clube da Esquina, Ivan Lins, Djavan, and Egberto Gismonti. At age 16 he wrote his first song, "Jangadeiro", which is said to have influenced his desire to become a composer.

In 1978 Lauria formed the band Nós e Voz, which was influenced by the vocal group Boca Livre. With this band he played throughout Brazil. In 1980, at the age of 20, he attended the local music academy, Pernambuco Conservatory of Music. In 1983 he received grants from the Brazilian government to study at Berklee College of Music in the U.S. He studied many genres of music, as well as harmony, counterpoint, ear training, and film production. He graduated in 1987 with a bachelor's degree in Professional Music.

Lauria's plan to return to Brazil changed in 1988 when he was invited to play at a concert with the Pat Metheny Group. Together they played a series of concerts at Night Stage Club in Cambridge, Massachusetts. In 1993 he signed with Narada Records, releasing Points of View (1994), with Lyle Mays and Danny Gottlieb, and Novo Brasil (1996). The songs were composed and produced by Lauria, and the albums entered the contemporary jazz chart in Billboard magazine. His music was played in the U.S., Canada, Europe, South America, and Asia. Lauria also collaborated with Chieli Minucci in the jazz fusion band Special EFX.

== Discography ==
- Points of View (Narada, 1994)
- Novo Brasil (Narada, 1996)

With Pat Metheny Group

- The Way Up – Live (2006) (DVD)
