= Ralf Illenberger =

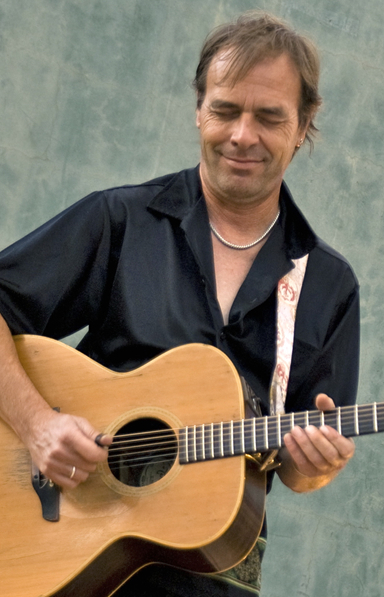
- Live at the "Sedona Martini Bar" • 2009

Background information
- Born: December 20, 1956 (age 68) Stuttgart, West Germany
- Genres: Classical, fingerstyle, folk, fusion, jazz, new-age
- Occupation(s): Musician, songwriter, producer
- Instruments: Guitar; Keyboard
- Years active: 1977–present
- Labels: Mood Records, Wundertuete, Biber Records, Narada Records, In Joy Music, Stockfisch Records
- Website: ralfillenberger.com

Ralf Illenberger (born December 20, 1956, in Stuttgart) is a German Grammy-nominated new-age guitarist.

== Biography ==
His first appearance was in 1977 as a duet with Jürgen Kirsch. He then founded the duo Kolbe & Illenberger with the guitarist and singer Martin Kolbe, releasing the album Waves in 1978. It was nominated for the Deutscher Schallplattenpreis. In the following years until 1987, they released six more albums and played over 1000 concerts in 40 countries, partly in collaboration with the Goethe-Institut.

In 1987 Illenberger formed the band Ralf Illenberger's Circle. An eponymous album released in 1988 was featured in the yearly top ten list of the magazine Pulse!. The title song of the next album Heart & Beat (1990) was a radio hit in the U.S. and attained the top spot in three radio play top lists. Soleil (1993) received a four-star review in Down Beat and was called "one of the best examples of the New Age genre" by the Chicago Tribune. The album Serenade with the multi-instrumentalist Büdi Siebert was released in 1994.

Since 1991 Illenberger has worked continually with the New Age singer Susan Osborn. They produced more albums and completed five tours of Japan. Since 1995, he has recorded the albums Sedona, Still Waters (with David Friesen), The Gateway, and The Kiss in his studio in Sedona, Arizona, where he lives. In 1997 he appeared on Hannes Wader's Schubert-interpretation album An Dich hab ich gedacht (English: "I thought about you") alongside Eberhard Weber on bass. Illenberger arranged the original piano backing for guitar and bass. In 2005 he released the album Beyond Words with the singer Lenedra Carroll (the mother of the singer Jewel, and in 2006 he worked as producer and arranger for the Hawaiian singer Kiana and the New Zealand singer Simon Spire. Since 2010 Ralf Illenberger works in a duo with guitarist Peter Autschbach. They released the albums "No Boundaries" and "One Mind".

== Partial discography ==
- Waves (with Martin Kolbe) (1978)
- Colouring The Leaves (with Martin Kolbe) (1979)
- Heart & Beat (1990)
- Soleil (1993)
- Serenade (with Büdi Siebert) (1994)
- Sedona (1995)
- Still Waters (1998)
- The Gateway (1999)
- The Kiss (1999)
- Best of Ralf Illenberger 1987–2001 (2001)
- Beyond Words (with Lenedra Carroll) (2005)
- Love Intense (2009)
- No Boundaries (with Peter Autschbach) (2012)
- One Mind (with Peter Autschbach) (2014)
