= Narada Productions =

American new-age music record label

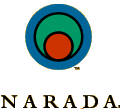
- Parent company: The Blue Note Label Group
- Founded: 1983
- Founder: John Morey
- Distributor: Blue Note
- Genre: New-age, smooth jazz, world, acoustic
- Country of origin: U.S.
- Location: New York City

Narada is a record label formed in 1983 as an independent new-age music label and distributed by MCA. From 1997–2013, the label was owned by Virgin Records on behalf of EMI. Since 2013, it is a fully owned subsidiary of Universal Music Group and distributed by Capitol Music Group's Blue Note Records. The label evolved through an expansion of formats to include world music, electronica, jazz, Celtic music, new flamenco, acoustic guitar, and piano releases.

== Label history ==
In 1979, John Morey started a mail-order business to sell new-age music. This led to the creation of Narada in Milwaukee in 1983, and the roster eventually included David Arkenstone, Jesse Cook, Michael Gettel, Michael Jones, David Lanz, Oscar Lopez, and Billy McLaughlin. Virgin Records bought Narada in 1997, along with Higher Octave and Back Porch, and directly signed Yanni, along with other New Age and Smooth Jazz acts.

During the late 1980s and early 1990s, Narada created several sub-label imprints to differentiate its offerings, in particular Sona Gaia, Antiquity Records, Rising Sun Records, Narada World, Narada Equinox, Narada Jazz, Narada Lotus, and Narada Mystique. Since the acquisition, Narada was the principal U.S. licensee for Peter Gabriel's Real World Records until 2008. The sub-labels of Narada were retired and their albums folded into the company's main imprint, Narada.

Shakti Records was created in 2000 for electronic music, but the last release was in 2004 as Narada concentrated on contemporary jazz. Higher Octave and Back Porch were absorbed into Narada in 2004 as sub-labels, without the original staff, significantly reducing their roster of artists and albums.

In 2005, Narada was named No. 4 in the 2005 top four contemporary jazz labels in Billboard magazine's year-end charts.

In 2006, EMI moved Narada from Milwaukee suburb Glendale, Wisconsin to EMI headquarters in New York City, to become part of the expanded role for Blue Note, EMI's consolidated label group for music for adults. Likewise merged in were Mosaic, Capitol Jazz, Roulette Jazz, Pacific Jazz, Manhattan, Angel, and Metro Blue; announced plans were to continue using existing imprints. As part of this consolidation, Narada's involvement with new-age music was reduced with Narada's focus narrowed to mainly contemporary jazz; new age would be put on sister label Higher Octave.

== Roster ==
- Azam Ali
- Altan
- Ancient Future
- David Arkenstone
- Spencer Brewer
- Bob Baldwin
- Peter Buffett
- Doug Cameron
- Paul Cardall
- Colin Chin
- Jesse Cook
- Joyce Cooling
- John Doan
- Down to the Bone
- Lila Downs
- William Ellwood
- Dean Evenson
- Alasdair Fraser
- Michael Gettel
- Wayne Gratz
- Ralf Illenberger
- Jim Jacobsen
- Michael Jones
- Bradley Joseph
- Martin Kolbe
- Kostia
- David Lanz
- Nando Lauria
- Gabriel Lee
- Tony Levin
- Oscar Lopez
- Jeff Lorber
- Peter Maunu
- Keiko Matsui
- Kathy Mattea
- Billy McLaughlin
- Robert Miles
- Sheldon Mirowitz
- Bruce Mitchell
- Carol Nethen
- Judith Pintar
- Kate Price
- Kim Robertson
- Randy Roos
- Don Ross
- Bernardo Rubaja
- Nancy Rumbel
- Richard Souther
- Paul Speer
- Ira Stein
- Miriam Stockley
- David Sylvian
- Eric Tingstad
- Tingstad & Rumbel
- Trapezoid
- Artie Traum
- Vas
- Andrew White
- Friedemann Witecka
- Simon Wynberg
- Hans Zimmer

== Compilation albums ==
- 20 Years of Narada Piano
- Grand Piano (Narada Anniversary Collection)
- Gypsy Passion: New Flamenco
- Narada Smooth Jazz
- Stories (Narada Artist Collection)
- The Next Generation – Narada Sampler
- Narada Film and Television Music Sampler (1998)
- The Wilderness Collection (1990)
- A Childhood Remembered (1991)
- Viva Flamenco! (2000)
- Flamenco: Fire and Grace (1996)
