= Louis Fishauf =

Canadian artist (born 1949)

Louis Fishauf (born 1949) is a Canadian award-winning graphic designer, art director and illustrator known for creating logos, magazines, websites, packaging and brand identities for such companies as Sympatico, Alias, Roots, Bata, Molson Breweries, Intact Insurance and others, as well as for his art direction of The City, City Woman, Saturday Night, T.O. and Toronto Life magazines. In 1982 he co-founded Reactor Art & Design, a Toronto-based design firm and illustration agency, where he was the Creative Director for 12 years until 1994.

In 1991 Fishauf received the Les Usherwood award for lifetime achievement by the Advertising & Design Club of Canada. He has also been the recipient of 6 gold awards from the National Magazine Awards Foundation. He was one of the first 40 inductees to Apple's AppleMasters, "an international group of educators, artists, designers, writers, producers, architects, inventors, scientists, business leaders, humanitarians, musicians, athletes, and others who think different.".

His digital collages are regularly posted on Facebook, Instagram and LinkedIn, and prints are available for purchase from East Side Studios London.
