= Grand Piano (Narada Anniversary Collection) =

Compilation album by Various artists
- Released: 1997
- Genre: Instrumental, adult contemporary, easy listening, new age
- Label: Narada

Professional ratings
Review scores
Source	Rating
Allmusic	link

Grand Piano is a 1997 compilation by Narada. It peaked at No. 10 on Billboard's Top New Age album charts in the same year.

From album liner: "In Narada's 15-year history, no single instrument has more clearly expressd our musical vision than the piano. Its vast scope and orchestral capabilities have allowed it to encompass a sweeping vista of music endowed with the beauty and spirit that characterizes our wide ranging repertoire. Over the years — from David Lanz and Michael Jones to Bradley Joseph — Narada's music has found its most eloquent expression in the hands of highly gifted pianists."

== Track listing ==
- 1.1 "Prelude: First Snow" – Michael Gettel – 3:01
- 1.2 "Summer's Child" – David Lanz – 6:10
- 1.3 "Portraits" – Spencer Brewer – 4:29
- 1.4 "Song For Eia (Edited)" – Michael Jones – 8:49
- 1.5 "A Gift Of The Sea" – Wayne Gratz – 6:52
- 1.6 "Gentle Earth And Sky" – Michael Gettel – 5:19
- 1.7 "Heartsounds" – David Lanz – 2:35
- 1.8 "For You" – Kostia – 5:10
- 1.9 "Cinderella" – Spencer Brewer – 3:01
- 1.10 "The Teacher" – Brian Mann – 4:01
- 1.11 "Farewell" – Kostia – 6:18
- 2.1 "Mexican Memories" – Michael Jones – 8:03
- 2.2 "Long Way From Home" – David Arkenstone – 3:49
- 2.3 "Courage Of The Wind" – David Lanz – 7:33
- 2.4 "Blue Ridge Part 2" – Wayne Gratz – 4:24
- 2.5 "Soliloquy" – Michael Whalen – 4:14
- 2.6 "The Last Roundup" – Richard Souther – 2:46
- 2.7 "Aspen Summer" – Michael Jones – 8:28
- 2.8 "Sacred Dance" – Ira Stein – 4:47
- 2.9 "Stray" – Bradley Joseph – 6:00
- 2.10 "Spirit" – Brian Mann – 5:27
- 2.11 "The Shape Of Her Face" – Michael Whalen – 4:27

== Personnel ==
- Executive Producer - Rich Denhart
- Other (Designed By) - Connie Cage
- Other (Mastered By) - Trevor Sadler
- Photography - Dick Baker
