= Gary Stroutsos =

American flute player (1954–2024)

- Born: July 19, 1954; Barre, Vermont, U.S.
- Died: October 12, 2024 (aged 70)
- Genres: Native American music
- Instrument: Flute
- Years active: 1990–2024
- Label: Zackbar
- Website: Gary Stroutsos

Gary Stroutsos (July 19, 1954 – October 12, 2024) was an American flute player based in Seattle, Washington, who played a variety of genres of music. He made his mark by tapping into the Native American canon, and brought several forgotten songs to life. He played a variety of different flutes from all around the world, and in unusual settings.

Stroutsos played and collaborated with many recognized musicians. Danilo Lozano, Jonn Serrie, William Eaton, Glen Velez, David Lanz, James Newton, Poncho Sanchez and Michito Sanchez to name a few. He was of Greek-Italian descent.

Noted flute maker Vance Pennington has constructed a Gary Stroutsos signature version of the Xiao, a flute that Stroutsos has introduced to Native American music.

Stroutsos died on October 12, 2024, from multiple system atrophy, a rare neurological disease that essentially deteriorates the brain and body functions it controls. He was 70.
