= Paul Speer =

Guitarist, composer and record producer

Paul Speer (born 1952 in Lewiston, Idaho) is a Grammy nominated guitarist, composer, and record producer. He has released several solo albums, music video albums, and collaborations with other artists such as pianist David Lanz, drummer Scott Rockenfield of Queensrÿche, Paul Lawler, and vocalist Satine Orient.

== Early years ==
Paul Speer took up guitar at the age of nine and played his first paid gig at age twelve in a trio with brothers Neal and Gary. In 1969, the expanded group now known as the Stone Garden, recorded the single "Oceans Inside Me" and pressed 300 copies, a rare collector item today.

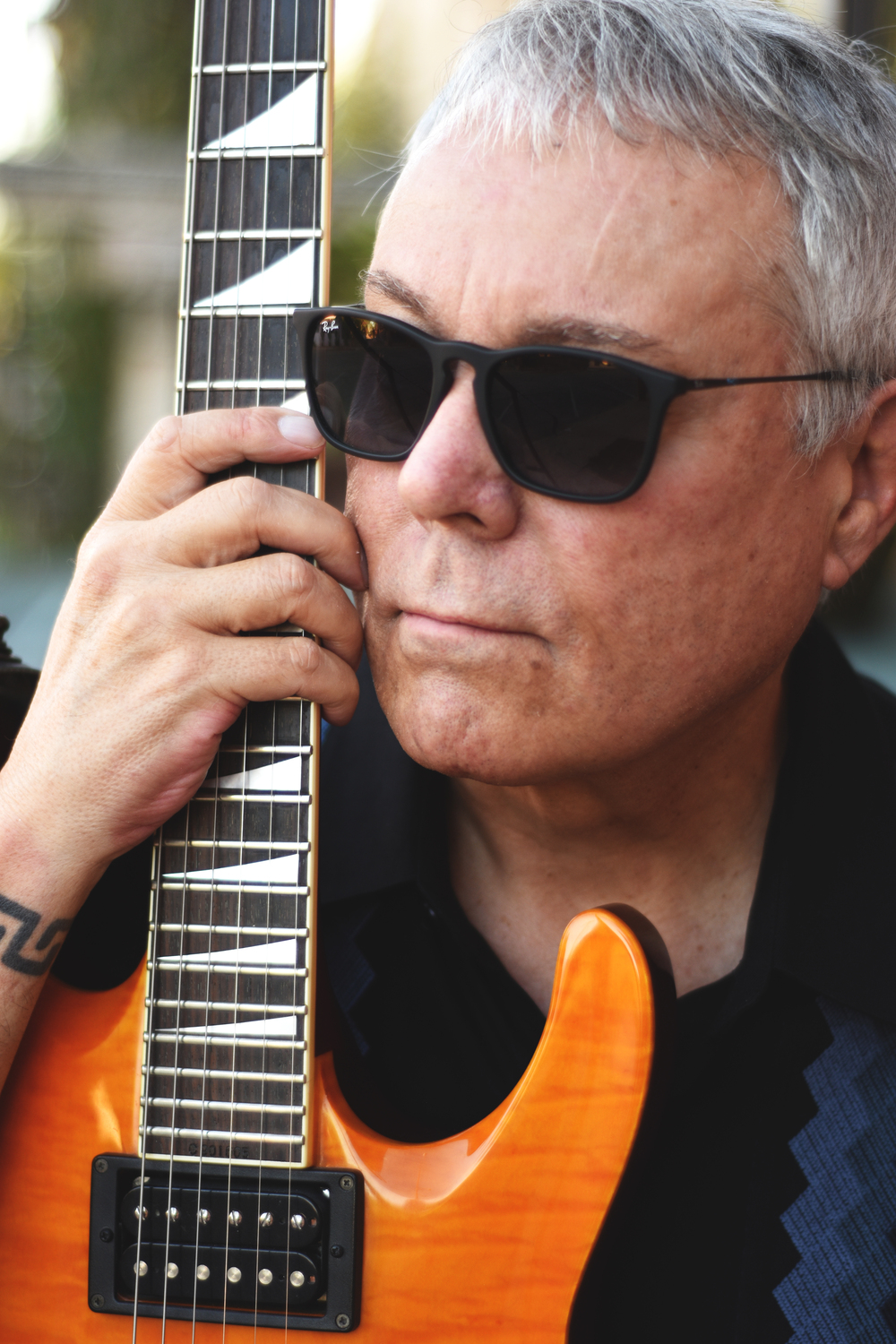
Paul Speer 2020

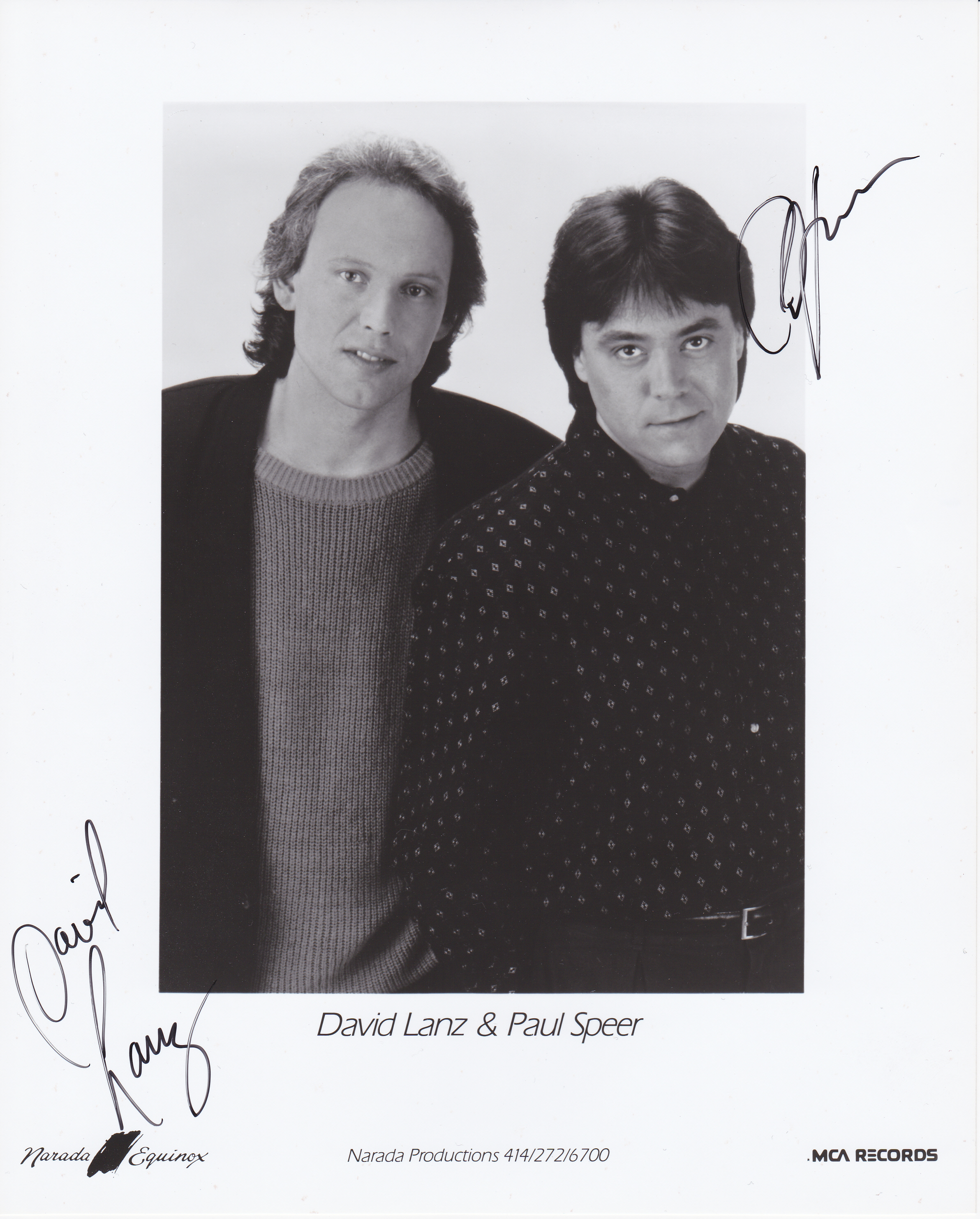
David Lanz and Paul Speer 1990

Speer attended music school at the University of Idaho in Moscow before moving to Seattle to play in nightclub bands. In the mid 1970s, he took up residence in Los Angeles where his interest expanded into audio production and engineering. Speer returned to Seattle in the late 1970s and began producing records in local recording studios and in his own studio.

== Career highlights ==
Catero Records (Fred Catero) of San Francisco signed Speer and released his first solo album Collection 983: Spectral Voyages in 1984. That was followed by two very successful music and video collaborations with David Lanz and director Jan Nickman, for the films Natural States (1985) and Desert Vision (1987).

Speer and Scott Rockenfield, drummer for the metal band Queensrÿche, teamed in 1997 to create another music and video work, the Grammy nominated TeleVoid. They also recorded Hells Canyon in 2000, a progressive rock opus inspired by places and events in the spectacular Hells Canyon region of Idaho.

Oculus, a music and video album inspired by places in Italy, was released by Speer's imprint label Rainstorm Records in 2008. In 2009, he collaborated with British musician Paul Lawler and French vocalist Satine Orient on the album Wonders.

In addition to his own productions, Paul Speer has been a record producer with more than 250 albums to his credit.

== Discography ==
Solo

- Collection 983: Spectral Voyages - 1984 - Catero Records (re-released on Rainstorm Records 2000)
- Collection 991: Music+Art - 1992 - Miramar Recordings
- Quiet Thoughts - 1998 - Rainstorm Records
- Oculus - 2008 - Rainstorm Records
- Ax Inferno - 2013 - Rainstorm Records
- Sonoran Odyssey - 2020 - Rainstorm Records
- Adventures in Space - 2024 - Rainstorm Records

Collaborations

- Stone Garden (band member) - "Oceans Inside Me" single - 1969 - Angelus Bell Records
- Natural States (with David Lanz) - 1985 - Narada/EMI Records /
- Desert Vision (with David Lanz) - 1987 - Narada/EMI Records
- Shades of Shadow (with Leroy Quintana) - 1990 - Miramar Recordings
- Bridge of Dreams (with David Lanz) - 1993 - Narada/EMI Records
- TeleVoid (with Scott Rockenfield) - 1997 - Miramar Recordings
- Stone Garden (band member) - 1998 (full album of music recorded 1965–1972) - Rockadelic Records
- Hells Canyon (with Scott Rockenfield) - 2000 - Rainstorm Records
- Wonders (with Paul Lawler and Satine Orient) - 2009 - Rainstorm Records
