= Friedemann Witecka =

German guitarist

- Born: August 31, 1951 (age 74); Freiburg im Breisgau

Friedemann Witecka (born August 31, 1951, in Freiburg im Breisgau) is a German guitarist, multi-instrumentalist, songwriter and music producer

== Life and work ==
Friedemann made his first appearances in his native town, at the former Southwest Radio and Talentschuppen TV between 1967 and 1970. In 1979 he released his first album The Beginning of Hope in which musicians such as Wolfgang Dauner, Lenny MacDowell, Thomas Heidepriem and singer Anne Haigis participated.

His albums Indian Summer (1987) and Aquamarine (1990) reached six-digit sales figures and were also successful in the United States. With around 550,000 records sold, he heard claims to be the most successful musicians of his genre.

The acoustic quality of his albums (CD and SACD) is often used for testing of systems engineering. In 1997 the readers of Audio (magazine) chose the CD Aquamarine as the "best audiophile CD of all times". For more than 10,000 copies sold of the album The Concert (2012) he received a German Jazz Award.

In its full tone music publisher and his record label Biber Records he released his own works and music of colleagues like Bonnie Dobson, Grant Geissman, Ralf Illenberger, Rüdiger Oppermann, Thomas Rabenschlag, Büdi Siebert, Christoph Stiefel and Klaus Weiland. It produces mainly instrumental and "hand-made music" the styles of New Age and Fusion.

== Studio albums ==
- Songs For A Beginning (1977)
- The Beginning Of Hope (1979)
- Voyager (1983)
- Goun & Friedemann - Les Oiseaux De Nuit (1985)
- Indian Summer (1987)
- Serah & Friedemann - Flight Of The Stork (1988)
- Aquamarine (1990)
- Patrick Largounez & Friedemann - Les Plaisirs De La Vie (1992)
- Legends Of Light - Music For The Ancient Land Of Belenos (1995)
- Passion And Pride (1999)
- Beauty And Mystery Of Touch (2000)
- Short Stories (2002)
- The Concert (2005)
- Memory Lane (2008)
- Saitensprung (2007)
- Echoes Of A Shattered Sky (2012)

== Compilation albums ==
- Voyager In Expanse (1986)
- New Moon (1988)
- On A Personal Note (1997)
- Best - The Sun At Midnight (2002)
- The Master Tracks (2015)
