= Jonn Serrie =

American electronic music composer

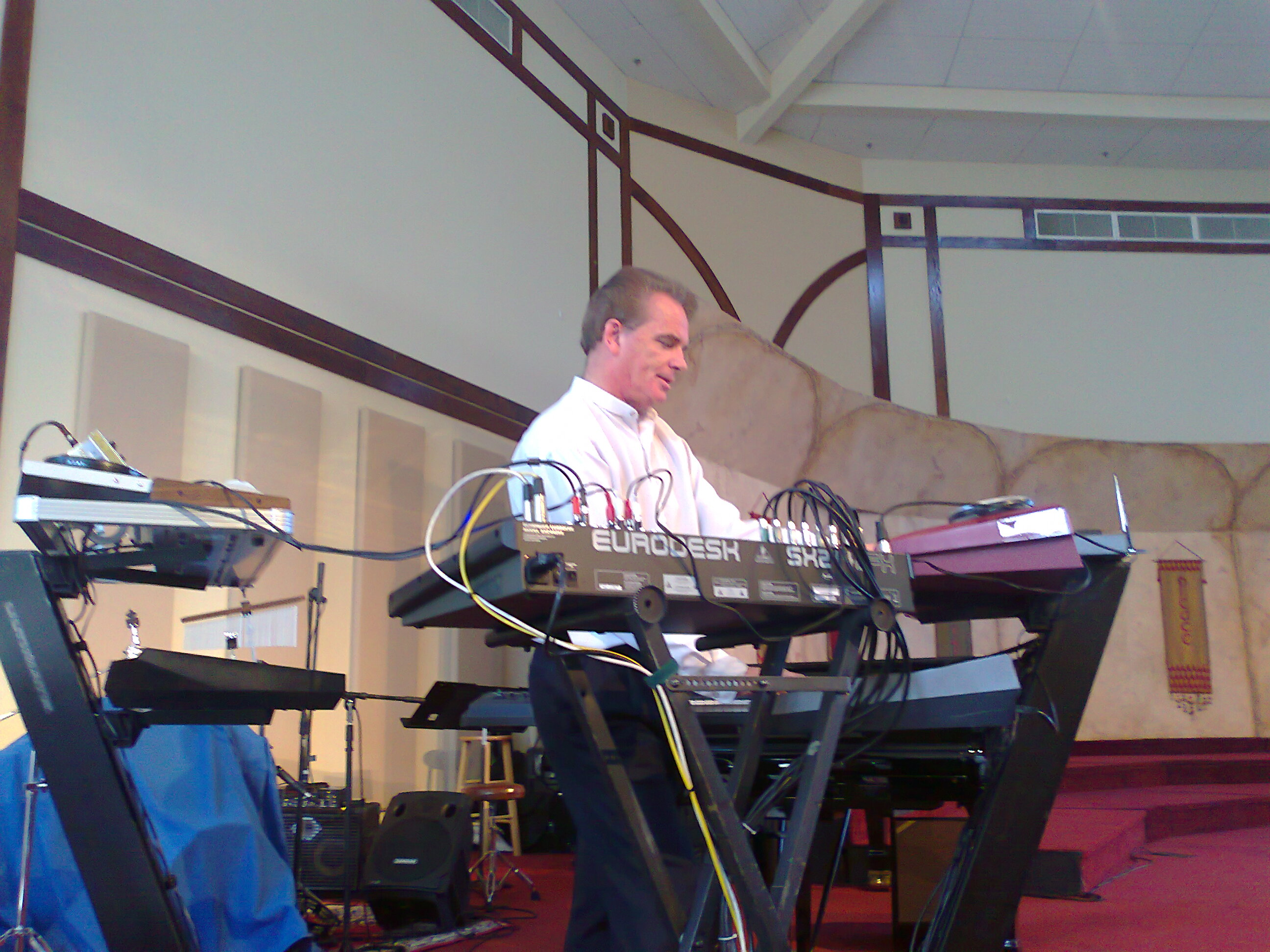

Background information
- Born: John Adrien Serrie III; January 27, 1951 (age 75); Waterford, Connecticut, United States
- Origin: Atlanta, Georgia, United States
- Genres: Space music, new-age, ambient
- Occupation: composer
- Years active: 1980s–present
- Labels: Miramar, New World Music, Valley Entertainment, Narada Productions
- Website: www.thousandstar.com

Jonn Serrie is an American composer of space music, a genre of ambient electronic music, and new age music. He has recorded over 30 albums and worked on projects for Lucasfilm, IMAX Corporation, NASA, the United States Navy, Hayden Planetarium, Expo Seville, and CNN.

== Musical career ==
Serrie has been composing and performing music for planetariums since the early 1980s. His first widely available album, And the Stars Go With You, was in memory of the astronauts lost in the Space Shuttle Challenger disaster in 1986. The following album, Flightpath, contains six songs that commemorate the pre-space-age test pilots of Edwards Air Force Base in the 1950s. Jonn is a pilot with advanced instrument and commercial ratings and flies for the Civil Air Patrol as a search-and-rescue pilot.

Serrie's next album, Tingri, was based on a remote village in Tibet. It was his way of infusing more spiritual and romantic emotion into his music. In so doing, he strayed a bit from his space music roots but without sacrificing his trademark sound. In 1992 and 1994, he made two albums in which he put his earlier planetarium work from the 1980s on CD, on Planetary Chronicles, Volume 1 and Planetary Chronicles, Volume 2. In between, in 1993 and 1995, Serrie composed his own musical science fiction story based on a fictional Century Princess in Midsummer Century and Ixlandia. In 1993, he submitted a song from his planetarium collection called "Soft Landing" to a Various Artists album sponsored largely by Steve Roach, a prominent electronic musician. This song is only available on this recording. In 1997, Serrie's first Christmas album Upon a Midnight Clear was released; he rearranged known and less-known Christmas songs from around the world in his unique style. Due to its popularity, Serrie released two more Christmas albums, Yuletides in 2001 and Merrily on High in 2004.

In 1998, Serrie collaborated with David Carradine on his tai chi video series and released a CD soundtrack based on the videos, called "Dream Journeys". Also in 1998, he took a trip to shamanic America, which resulted in his musical collaboration with several Native American elders on "Spirit Keepers".

In 1999, Serrie appeared as a special guest of honor at the 30th anniversary of the Apollo 11 Moon landing mission, which was held in Cape Canaveral. As the final act of the after-dinner entertainment, he played a specially composed song "Out of the Blue", which has not been officially released.

The year 2000 brought Serrie's "best of" space music compilation, Century Seasons. On this album two new songs appeared, although "Deep Mystery" reappeared on "Lumia Nights" two years later in a slightly shorter version. The other bonus track, "Andromeda Dream", appeared on this album. In 2000 Serrie collaborated with flutist Gary Stroutsos on the Narada label, on an album called Hidden World.

Since 2000, several of Serrie's albums have appeared on independent labels. 2002 brought Lumia Nights, a space romance release on Valley Entertainment, composed in the style of Ixlandia and Midsummer Century. In 2003, he signed a contract with New World Music, a major label in England, which included the reissue of his earlier Miramar releases. 2003 also brought The Stargazer's Journey with liner notes from famed astronomer David H. Levy. This was a return to form in Serrie's more traditional space music style.

Serrie took an interesting musical turn in 2005 with Epiphany, Meditations on Sacred Hymns, featuring his arrangement of traditional hymns and psalms, which he dedicated to his grandmother, his primary childhood church organ and piano teacher. He followed this up in 2006 with Sunday Morning, an independent release for autistic children and their parents. A portion of the profits from this CD goes to support for autism organizations in the United States.

Also in 2006, music from one of his albums was used in the hit Hollywood movie What the Bleep Do We Know!? Serrie scored the award-winning IMAX short film Hubble: Galaxies Across Space and Time as well as the popular astronomy software program Starry Nights and Space.com's Eyes on Mars DVD.

In 2009, Serrie released the album Thousand Star.

In 2011 the album Sunday Morning was expected be released, available worldwide. In 2014 the album "Day Star" was released available worldwide on New World Music In 2017 the album "The Sentinel" was released available worldwide on New World Music

Jonn Serrie founded the Galaxy Music Scholarship in 2001, a US$1000 annual scholarship for graduating high school seniors desiring a career in new age and space music composition. He lives in Atlanta, Georgia.

== Discography ==
=== Studio albums ===
- 1984 — Starmoods (cassette only)
- 1987 — And the Stars Go with You
- 1989 — Flightpath
- 1990 — Tingri
- 1992 — Planetary Chronicles, Volume 1
- 1993 — Midsummer Century
- 1994 — Planetary Chronicles, Volume 2
- 1994 — Tai Chi Meditation, Vol. 1: Life Force Breathing (narrated by Dr. Jerry Alan Johnson)
- 1994 — Tai Chi Meditation, Vol. 2: Eight Direction Perception (narrated by Dr. Jerry Alan Johnson)
- 1995 — Ixlandia
- 1997 — Upon a Midnight Clear (also released in 2000 as Christmas Dreams)
- 1998 — Spirit Keepers
- 1998 — Dream Journeys
- 2000 — Hidden World (with Gary Stroutsos) (Narada/Virgin/EMI)
- 2001 — Lumia Nights (Valley Entertainment)
- 2001 — Yuletides
- 2003 — The Stargazer's Journey
- 2004 — Merrily on High
- 2005 — Epiphany: Meditations on Sacred Hymns (Valley Entertainment)
- 2009 — Hidden World Beyond (with Gary Stroutsos) (Valley Entertainment)
- 2009 — Thousand Star
- 2010 — Christmas Prayers (Valley Entertainment)
- 2011 — Sunday Morning Peace (2006 release, limited edition Sunday Morning, 2011 as Maiden Voyage with Hemi-Sync)
- 2014 — Day Star
- 2017 — The Sentinel
- 2019 — Azurae
- 2023 — Elysian Lightships
- 2023 — Sunday Morning Peace Reimagined EP
- 2024 — Ascendant Destiny

=== Compilation albums ===
- 2000 — Century Seasons: The Space Music of Jonn Serrie

=== Collaboration albums ===
- 2015 — Celestial Rhythms: NYC Live '85 (songs by Geodesium, Jonn Serrie, Barry Hayes)
- 2011 — Music for Accelerated-Consciousness Love-Making (songs by Iasos, Jonn Serrie & Kevin Kendle)

=== Visual albums ===
- 1993 — Dazzle (visuals by James R. Shiflett)

== See also ==
- List of ambient music artists
