= James Reynolds (composer) =

American-German composer (born 1953)

James Reynolds (born 1953) studied contemporary music under John Adams, as well as percussion at the San Francisco Conservatory of Music and composition in Cologne under Michael von Biel. Informed by many different influences – from Neue Musik, Broadway and European music theatre to avant-garde synthpop – Reynolds’ compositions explore the combination of words, sounds and images. He was Composer in Residence at the Stiftung Laurenz-Haus in Basel and Visiting Artist at the University of California, Santa Barbara. For over three decades, he has written music for literary productions, thrillers, fairytales and children's radio plays for West German Radio (WDR/Cologne). His compositions for music theatre, dance-theatre, film and television productions are performed and broadcast for and to an international audience.

James Reynolds lives in Berlin.

== Productions (selected) ==
=== Music theatre ===
- POE – Dreamworlds (Melodram) Stadttheater Bremerhaven, Bremerhavener Symphoniker 2019
- Ghost Knight, Deutsche Oper am Rhein Duisburg & Düsseldorf 2019
- Ghost Knight, Opera Bonn 2017
- Tucholskys Spiegel, Chamber Opera Festival Rheinsberg 2017
- A Throw of the dice will never abolish chance, Sydney Conservatory of Music 2017
- Das Moses-Jahwe-Projekt, WDR Köln 2005
- Vergeltung, WDR Köln 2003
- Die Prozedur, WDR Köln
- Fantasy1, Viola d’amore Society New York, HR Frankfurt 1987

=== Theatre and dance ===
- Sammlung Prinzhorn, Theater Heidelberg
- Über das Marionettentheater, Accor Festival for Alternative Theatre, Israel
- Fürst Pücklers Utopia, Staatstheater Cottbus
- Felix Nussbaum, Stadttheater Osnabrück
- Die Bibel als Theater, Stadttheater Bern, Jewish Museum New York, Accor Festival for Alternative Theatre in Israel
- Maestro, Salzburger Landestheater
- Amerika, Theater Bremen
- RATS, Bonn Opera
- Tanzmarathon, Bonn Opera
- Die Mäusehochzeit w/ Michael Villmow, Opera Cologne, Philharmonie Cologne

=== Films ===
- Der Schatz von Timbuktu – eine Rettungsgeschichte, Arte 2016
- Der Vietnam Krieg: Gesichter einer Tragödie, ARD (Gold World Medal, New York Festivals 2016) 2015
- Frauen und Ozeane, Arte 2015
- Geliebte Feinde, Arte (episodes 3-5-8-9) 2013/2014
- Auf Expeditionsreise nach Madagaskar, Arte 2013
- Auf Expeditionsreise durch Australien, Arte 2013
- Auf Expeditionsreise durch Tansania, Arte 2013
- Auf Expeditionsreise an die Küste Costa Ricas, Arte 2013
- Verborgenes Venedig, Arte 2012
- Das Land der Dogon, Arte 2012
- Opfer und Verführer, Arte 2010
- Wohin treibt der Islam, ZDF 2010
- Akte Theo: Ungelöst – Eine Baseler Spurensuche, Arte 2010
- Chaim (Winner Short Tiger Filmpreis München, Winner "Best Docu", Woodstock Film Festival) 2006 / 2007

=== Radio plays ===
- Illegal, Deutschlandfunk 2017
- Der Untergang Jerusalems, WDR 2015 / 2016
- GastSpiele, WDR, Funkhaus Europa 2015
- Narrenteufel, WDR 2007
- Aladin, WDR 2007
- Gilgamesch, WDR 2006
- Moses und die Wüste der Wunder, WDR 2004
- Salammbô, WDR 2004
- Ein Job, WDR 2003
- Lügen im Dunkeln, WDR 2002
- Die Räuber von Liang Schan Moor, WDR 2004
- Die Legende vom heiligen Trinker, WDR 2002
- Das Bildnis des Dorian Gray, WDR 2000
- Die Prozedur, WDR 2000
- Die letzte Reise der Titanic, WDR, NDR, HR 2000
- Odysseus, WDR
