= Doug Cameron (musician) =

Canadian musician and composer

Douglas John Cameron is a Canadian musician and composer best known for writing and performing a protest song entitled "Mona with the Children" about a Persian Baháʼí girl aged 17, Mona Mahmudnizhad, who, in 1983, together with nine other Baháʼí women, was sentenced to death and hanged in Shiraz, Iran, because of her membership in the Baháʼí Faith. Cameron recreated Mahmudnizhad's story in a music video, Mona with the Children, which made the pop charts in Canada (#14 for the week of October 19, 1985). Partly to distinguish himself from new age composer Doug Cameron the name John was added. He also worked with collaborator Jack Lenz (also a Baha'i) on children's TV, notably Treehouse TV, where he performed under the name Douglas John.

== See also ==
- Mona Mahmudnizhad
- the indie music archive
- music video: Mona with the Children
- Doug Cameron at IMDb
