= David Lanz =

American pianist and composer (born 1950)

- Born: June 28, 1950 (age 76); Seattle, Washington, U.S.
- Genres: Classical, New age, jazz
- Occupations: Musician, composer
- Instruments: Piano, keyboards
- Years active: 1964–present
- Labels: Narada, Decca Records
- Website: www.davidlanz.com

David Howard Lanz (born June 28, 1950, in Seattle, Washington) is an American pianist and composer. His album Cristofori's Dream topped the New Age Music Chart in 1988.

== Early years ==
Lanz attributes his interest in the piano to experiences during his childhood in the Pacific Northwest. He was inspired to play piano by his mother. She played songs by Ray Charles, Frank Sinatra, and Nat King Cole on the piano and became his first musical mentor.

Lanz started his performing career as a teenager during the 1960s. In 1971, he recorded an album for Mercury Records with the Canadian group Brahman. He played keyboards on the hit song "Seasons in the Sun" by Terry Jacks. In the late 1970s, he was musical director for the Seattle band the Sweep, with Ken McCann as singer, Peter Pendras on lead guitar, Glenn Ayers on drums, and Hugh Gerrard on bass. Saxophonist Robbie Jordan was added to the group after a gig in Boise, Idaho.

Lanz shifted to playing solo acts in local clubs. At a nightclub in Seattle, he began to perform his own compositions and moved from rock to jazz and blues.

== Recording career ==
The 1980s saw the birth of a new type of musical talent in Lanz. During this time, with the help of a friend, he began composing what would now be considered New Age music. From the 1980s onward, he has released a steady stream of albums, including his ground-breaking album Heartsounds, his first solo album, which boosted the popularity of his record label, Narada.

== Style ==
Lanz's goal is to have his music create an atmosphere of hope and enlightenment. In an interview with Barnes & Noble, Lanz stated that he wanted to create an atmosphere similar to that of Steven Halpern's music, but with a "more popular hook in it".

Lanz has said, "[The piano] is the most divinely inspired instrument on the planet. It presents a great attraction to our left-right brain relationship. My goal is to create entertainment that also provides hope and enlightenment."

In the front of his Musicbook, The David Lanz Collection, he writes: "At the piano, I'm able to communicate in a way that is very intimate and direct. My approach at music is a bit like talking to a friend. You don't have to be very complicated when you speak. If you say what's in your heart, it's usually very simple."

Lanz's style spans the popular songbook as well. His 2009 release, Liverpool: Re-imagining The Beatles, made with Xiao flute master Gary Stroutsos pays homage to the music of The Beatles.

== Discography ==
=== Studio albums ===
- 1983 Heartsounds
- 1985 Nightfall
- 1985 Natural States (with Paul Speer)
- 1985 Solstice (with Michael Jones)
- 1987 Woodlands (with Tingstad and Rumbel)
- 1987 Desert Vision (with Paul Speer)
- 1988 Cristofori's Dream
- 1990 Skyline Firedance
- 1991 Return to the Heart
- 1993 Bridge of Dreams (with Paul Speer)
- 1994 Christmas Eve
- 1996 Sacred Road
- 1996 Convergence (with David Arkenstone)
- 1998 Songs from an English Garden
- 1999 An Evening with David Lanz
- 1999 Cristofori's Dream (remastered with additional track)
- 1999 The Christmas Album
- 1999 East of the Moon
- 2002 Finding Paradise
- 2003 The Symphonic Sessions
- 2004 The Good Life
- 2005 Spirit Romance
- 2006 Sacred Road Revisited
- 2007 A Cup of Moonlight (revised official release with additional tracks - 2003 limited website edition)
- 2008 Living Temples
- 2008 Painting the Sun
- 2009 Liverpool: Re-imagining the Beatles
- 2011 Here Comes the Sun
- 2011 Here Comes the Sun (solo piano edition)
- 2012 Christofori's Dream Re-envisioned
- 2012 Joy Noel
- 2013 Movements of the Heart
- 2014 Forever Christmas (compilation with Kristin Amarie)
- 2015 Silhouettes of Love (compilation with Kristin Amarie)
- 2016 Norwegian Rain
- 2017 French Impressions
- 2020 Water Sign
- 2022 Lettere D'amore - Letters of Love (with Kristin Amarie)
- 2024 Valentine Hill
- 2024 Ayres (with Kristin Amarie)
- 2024 Moonlight Lake (with Kristin Lanz)
- 2026 Carousel

=== Singles ===
- 2000 "Angel in My Stocking" – Limited Edition

=== Live albums ===
- 2010 Liverpool Trio: Live in Seoul

=== Compilation albums ===
- 1995 Beloved: A David Lanz Collection
- 2001 Love Songs
- 2002 Romantic: The Ultimate David Lanz Collection
- 2003 Heartsounds/Nightfall (rereleased/remastered)
- 2005 The Best of David Lanz

== Compilation appearances ==
- 20 Years of Narada Piano
- Grand Piano (Narada Anniversary Collection)
- Narada Smooth Jazz
- Narada Film and Television Music Sampler

== See also ==
- List of ambient music artists

== Sources ==
David Lanz, "Solos for New Age Piano" copyright 1991 NARADA Music Inc. pp. 2–3
