= Primero Soy Mexicana =

2018 album by Mexican singer Ángela Aguilar

Studio album by Ángela Aguilar
- Released: March 2, 2018
- Recorded: 2017 at Rancho El Soyate in Villanueva, Zacatecas
- Genre: Mariachi
- Language: Spanish
- Label: Machin
- Producer: Pepe Aguilar

Ángela Aguilar chronology
Primero Soy Mexicana (2018)	Baila Esta Cumbia (2020)

Singles from Primero Soy Mexicana
- 1. "Tú Sangre en Mi Cuerpo" Released: 2017; 2. "La Llorona" Released: 2018; 3. "Cielo Rojo" Released: 2018; 4. "Corazoncito Tirano" Released: 2018; 5. "Paloma Negra" Released: 2018

Primero Soy Mexicana ("First I Am Mexican") is the debut studio album by Mexican singer Ángela Aguilar, released on March 2, 2018, by Machin Records. The album was produced by Aguilar's father, Pepe Aguilar and features ranchera and mariachi music. Her grandmother Flor Silvestre's first film, Primero soy mexicano, inspired the album's title.

The album earned a Latin Grammy nomination for Best Ranchero Album at the 19th Annual Latin Grammy Awards in 2018 and a Grammy nomination for Best Regional Mexican Music Album at the 61st Annual Grammy Awards in 2019.

== Recordings ==
Primero Soy Mexicana features eleven well known ranchera songs previously performed by other artists who Aguilar considers strong female artists in the ranchera genre. The album was recorded at the Aguilar family ranch "Rancho El Soyate" in Villanueva, Zacatecas. The first track, “Ya No Me Interesas”, was previously recorded by Mexican singer Lucha Villa on her 1985 album, Interpreta a Juan Gabriel. The second track, "Corazoncito Tirano", was written and performed by Mexican singer-songwriter Cuco Sánchez on his 1990 album La Voz de Mexico. The third song, "Cielito Lindo", has been sung by a plethora of artists dating back to the early 1900s. The fourth track, "La Tequilera", was previously sung by Lucha Villa on her 1967 album that bears the same name. The album's fifth track, "Cielo Rojo", was first recorded by Aguilar's grandmother, Flor Silvestre in 1957, and is credited as the breakthrough in her musical career.

The sixth track, "Tu Sangre en Mi Cuerpo", was composed by Río Roma’s Jose Luis Ortega for his son’s 2016 album Como Tu Sangre en Mi Cuerpo. The seventh track, "La Llorona", has been performed by many artists, most notably, Chavela Vargas and Eugenia León. The eighth recording, "La Basurita", was previously performed by Flor Silvestre on her 1958 self titled album. The ninth song, "Cucurrucucú Paloma", was written and recorded by Tomás Méndez in 1954. The tenth track, "Paloma Negra", was also written by Méndez and released by Lola Beltrán on her 1988 album La Grande. The final song, "Me Gustas Mucho", was composed by Mexican singer-songwriter Juan Gabriel for Spanish singer Rocío Dúrcal in 1984.

== Reception ==
Primero Soy Mexicana was included in Billboard’s 20 Best Latin Albums of 2018 list, coming in at number thirteen. Billboard proclaimed Aguilar “...[is] an artist you’ll want to keep on your radar.”

The album was nominated for a Latin Grammy Award for Best Ranchero/Mariachi Album at the 19th Annual Latin Grammy Awards in 2018, which went to Luis Miguel’s ¡México Por Siempre! Aguilar was also nominated for Best New Artist, but lost to Colombian reggaetón singer Karol G. At the ceremony, Aguilar performed a rendition of “La Llorona”, and received a standing ovation. The recording has also garnered a nomination for a Grammy Award for Best Regional Mexican Music Album at the 61st Annual Grammy Awards in 2019, which also went to Luis Miguel's ¡México Por Siempre!. Aguilar performed "La Llorona" at the pre-telecast ceremony with fellow Mexican singers, Aida Cuevas and Natalia Lafourcade.

== Track listing ==
No.	Title	Writer(s)	Length
1.	"Ya No Me Interesas"	Alberto Aguilera Valadez	2:24
2.	"Corazoncito Tirano"	José Refugio Sánchez Saldaña	2:27
3.	"Cielito Lindo"	Quirino Mendoza y Cortés	4:31
4.	"La Tequilera"	Alfredo d’Orsay	3:03
5.	"Cielo Rojo"	Juan Záizar Torres	3:55
6.	"Tu Sangre En Mi Cuerpo" (featuring Pepe Aguilar)	José Luis Ortega Castro	3:58
7.	"La Llorona"	Andrés Henestrosa	8:10
8.	"La Basurita"	Juan Záizar Torres	2:28
9.	"Cucurrucucú Paloma"	Tomás Méndez Sosa	4:18
10.	"Paloma Negra"	Tomás Méndez Sosa	3:29
11.	"Me Gustas Mucho"	Alberto Aguilera Valadez	2:50

== Charts ==
=== Weekly charts ===
Chart (2019)	Peak position
Mexico (Top 100 Mexico)	6

== See also ==
- 2018 in Latin music
