= Flor Silvestre con el Mariachi México, vol. 2 =

Studio album by Flor Silvestre
- Released: 1964
- Genre: Ranchera; bolero; huapango
- Label: Musart

Flor Silvestre chronology
Flor Silvestre con el Mariachi México (1963)	Flor Silvestre con el Mariachi México, vol. 2 (1964)	La sentimental Flor Silvestre (1964)

Singles from Flor Silvestre con el Mariachi México, vol. 2
- 1. "Gracias" Released: 1964; 2. "Perdí la partida" Released: 1964

Flor Silvestre con el Mariachi México, vol. 2 is a studio album by Mexican singer Flor Silvestre, released in 1964 by Musart Records.

== Background ==
Although the liner notes describe Flor Silvestre, vol. 2 as Flor Silvestre's "second album of songs", it is actually her third Musart album. Her previous Musart albums are Flor Silvestre and Flor Silvestre con el Mariachi México.

== Critical reception ==
Cashbox included Flor Silvestre, vol. 2 in its Latin Picks section and gave it a rave review:

Multi-talented vocalist Flor Silvestre gives her heart and soul on this album of love songs and Mexican folk music. The Mariachi Mexico de Pepe Villa backing her is superb. This album was recorded in Mexico, and she excels vocally on every cut. The best songs are "Perdi La Partida," "Nuestro Gran Amor," "Bendicion De Dios," "Que Bonito Amor," "Plegaria" and "Lagrimas Del Alma."

== Track listing ==
Side one

No.	Title	Writer(s)	Length
1.	"Gracias"	Algueró; Matos
2.	"Perdí la partida"	Marcelo Salazar
3.	"Nuestro gran amor"	Cuco Sánchez
4.	"Bendición de Dios"	Rolando Peña
5.	"Árboles viejos"	Antonio Valdés Herrera
6.	"Ay! el amor"	Tomás Méndez

Side two

No.	Title	Writer(s)	Length
1.	"Te digo adiós"	Galo Montes
2.	"Un jarrito"	Gabriel Rodríguez
3.	"Qué bonito amor"	José Alfredo Jiménez
4.	"Quédate esta vez"	Godínez L. Brothers
5.	"Plegaria"	Armando Idrovo
6.	"Lágrimas del alma"	Bony Villaseñor

== Personnel ==
- Mariachi México de Pepe Villa – accompaniment
