= La Llorona (song) =

Mexican folk song

"La Llorona" (lit. "The weeping woman") is a Mexican folk song derived from the legend of La Llorona. There are many versions of the song. Its origins are obscure, but, around 1941, composer Andres Henestrosa mentioned hearing the song in the Isthmus of Tehuantepec. He popularized the song and may have added to the existing verses.

In Latin America the song is associated with the Day of the Dead.

== Composition ==
There are scores of different verses found in recordings of the song. Here are a few of the best known:

The melody of La Llorona, which is in the public domain

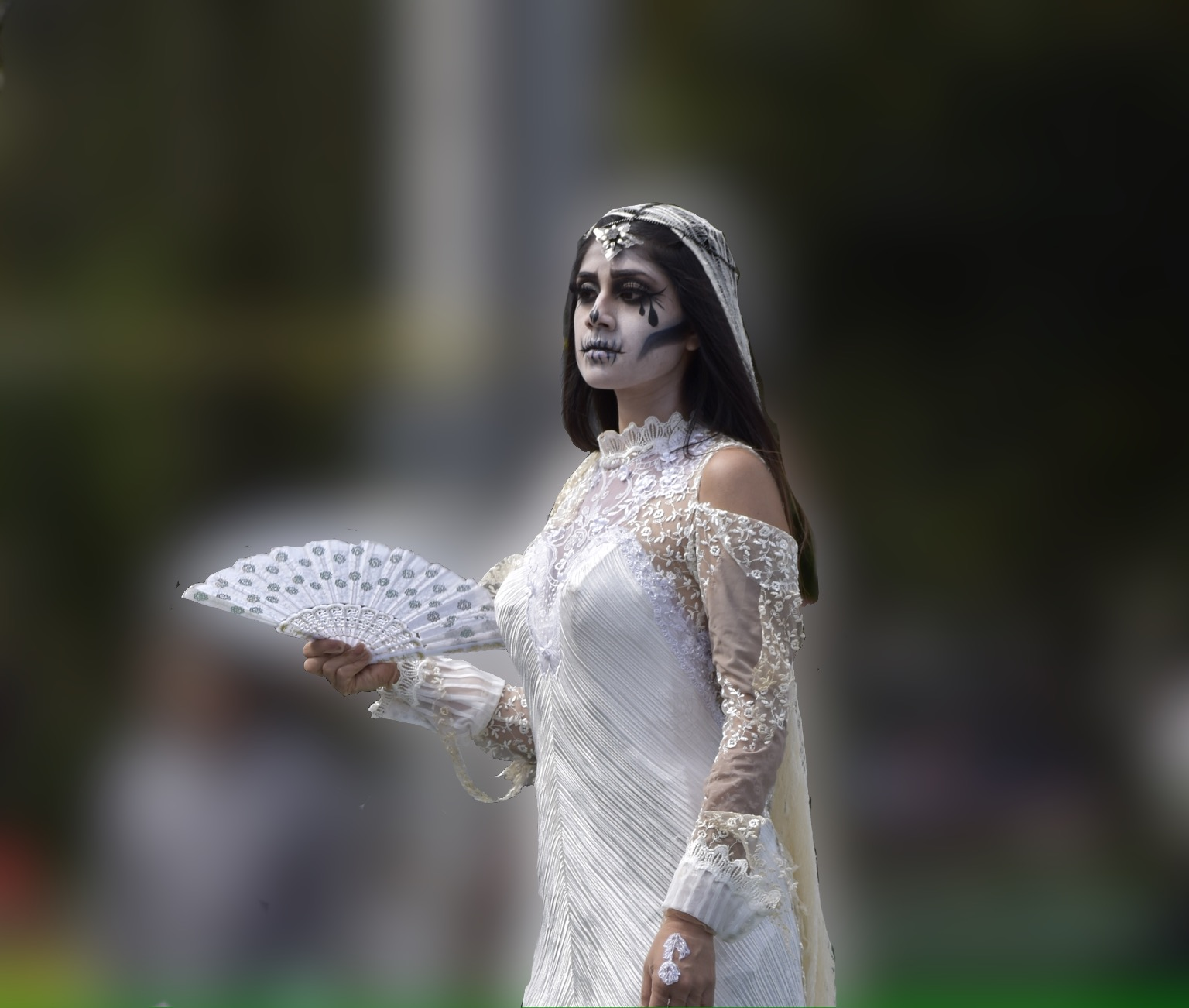
La Llorona as portrayed in a parade in Orizaba Mexico.

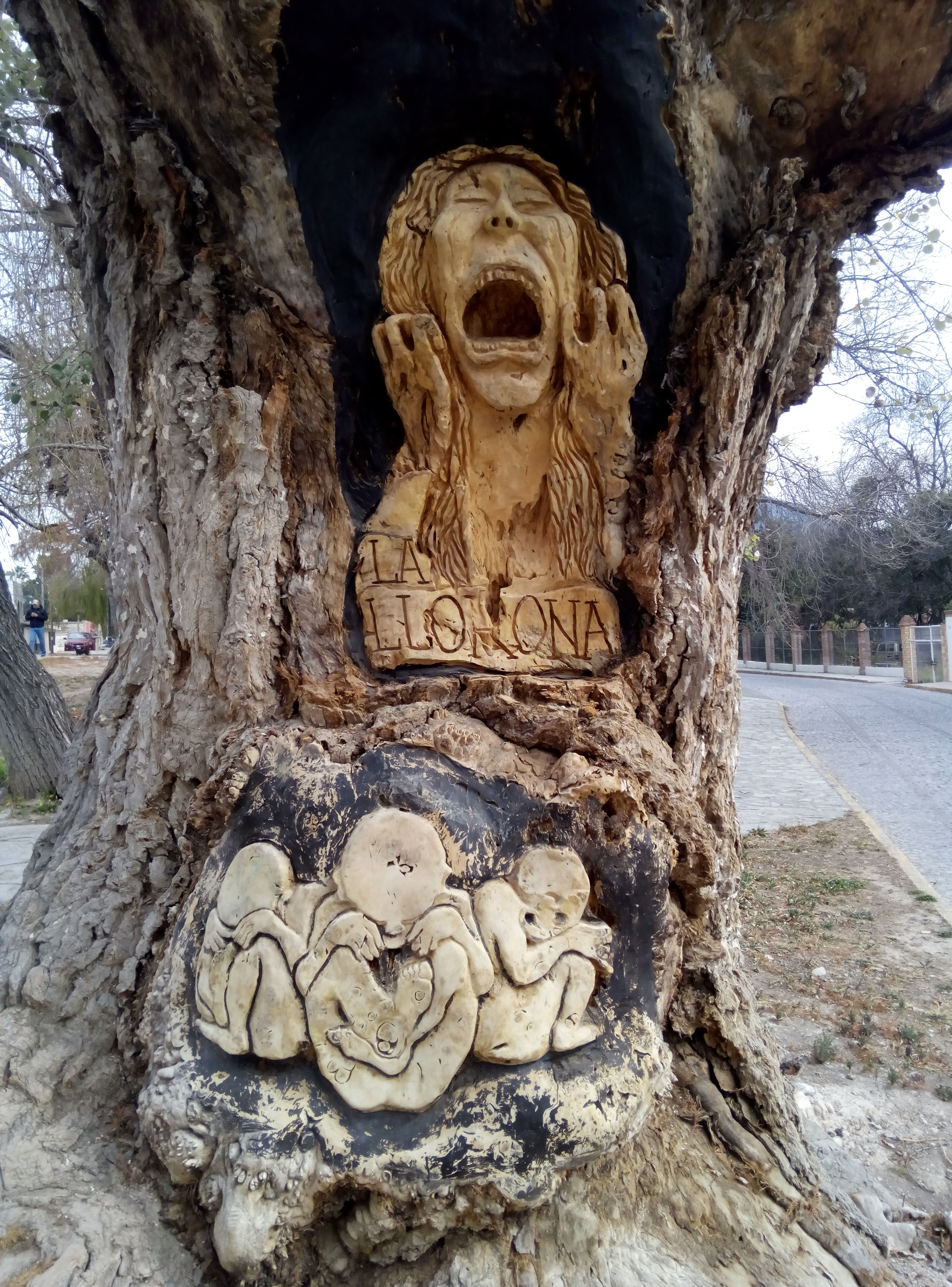
A wood carving of La Llorona in Coahuila, Mexico.

Salías del templo un día, Llorona,
Cuando al pasar yo te vi,
Salías del templo un día, Llorona,
Cuando al pasar yo te vi,
Hermoso huipil llevabas, Llorona,
Que la Virgen te creí.
Hermoso huipil llevabas, Llorona,
Que la Virgen te creí.

Todos me dicen el negro, Llorona,
negro, pero cariñoso.
Todos me dicen el negro, Llorona,
negro, pero cariñoso.
Yo soy como el chile verde, Llorona,
picante, pero sabroso.
Yo soy como el chile verde, Llorona,
picante, pero sabroso.

Ay que dolor, que penas, Llorona, Llorona, que penas las mias
Ay que dolor, que penas, Llorona, Llorona, que penas las mias
De que me sirvio el dolor, tu dime, si ya no me pertenecías
De que me sirvio el dolor, tu dime, si ya no me pertenecías

La pena y lo que no es pena, Llorona,
Todo es pena para mí,
La pena y lo que no es pena, Llorona,
Todo es pena para mí,
Ayer penaba/lloraba por verte, Llorona
Y hoy peno/lloro porque te vi.
Ayer penaba/lloraba por verte, Llorona
Y hoy peno/lloro porque te vi.

Ay de mí, Llorona, Llorona
Llorona de azul celeste
Ay de mí, Llorona, Llorona
Llorona de azul celeste
No dejaré de quererte, Llorona
Y, aunque la vida me cueste
No dejaré de quererte, Llorona
Y, aunque la vida me cueste.

You came out of the temple one day, Llorona,
I saw you when you passed,
You came out of the temple one day, Llorona,
I saw you when you passed,
A beautiful dress you wore, Llorona,
I thought you were the Virgin
A beautiful dress you wore, Llorona,
I thought you were the Virgin

Everyone calls me 'the black', Llorona
Black but loving
Everyone calls me 'the black', Llorona
Black but loving
I am like the green chili pepper, Llorona
spicy, but tasty
I am like the green chili pepper, Llorona
spicy, but tasty

Oh what pain, what sorrows, Llorona, Llorona, what sorrows of mine
Oh what pain, what sorrows, Llorona, Llorona, what sorrows of mine
Of what use was the pain, you tell me, if you no longer belonged to me
Of what use was the pain, you tell me, if you no longer belonged to me

(What it is) sorrow and what is not sorrow, Llorona
Everything is sorrow for me
(What it is) sorrow and what is not sorrow, Llorona
Everything is sorrow for me
Yesterday I cried to see you, Llorona
And Today I cry because I saw you
Yesterday I cried to see you, Llorona
And Today I cry because I saw you

Alas, Llorona, Llorona, Llorona of sky-blue
Alas, Llorona, Llorona, Llorona of sky-blue
Although it costs me my life, Llorona
I will not stop loving you
Although it costs me my life, Llorona
I will not stop loving you.

== Interpretations of "La Llorona" ==
One popular interpretation of the song is of the singer feeling trapped by a woman (La Llorona) who has fallen in love with him. If he even thinks about leaving her, she weeps. He tries everything in his power to leave her, but he is trapped by pity for the woman. He wishes to be taken down to the river to be drowned, and so then his suffering can finally end. The suffering that the man goes through from being trapped in a relationship with the woman in a way parallels the suffering that the woman in the legend goes through from having her lover leave her.

Another interpretation following the lyrics is that the "llorona" represents the singer's deceased or abandoned spouse which would explain the morbid references throughout the song and why the lover never seems to actually try to reach her. Examples include "duelo" (mourning), and "campo santo" (cemetery).

The Llorona is traditionally a Banshee-like folk ghost that haunts her lover after having drowned her children, and who now cries for her dead children. She foretells death to those who see it. There are many variations to the verses of the song that have been adapted for different audiences throughout the years. The song is not considered a love song because of its overall sad tones and has been used for Día de Muertos festivities.

Folklorists of Mesoamerica theorize that La Llorona represents a survival of the basic Mesoamerican myth called, "Why the Earth Eats the Dead."

== Popular covers ==
"La Llorona" falls under the genre of Mexican folklore and ranchera because of its origins as a legend and its heavy use of the guitar, respectively. During the 1960s "folksong revival" in the United States, guitarist Jerry Silverman featured a duet arrangement of the song in the final chapter of Volume 2 of "The Folksinger's Guitar Guide," subtitled "An Advanced Instruction Guide" (1964, Oak Publications, New York), and sang the song in Spanish, with both guitar parts overdubbed, on an accompanying record, recently made available on YouTube. No pre-1964 source recordings or publications were identified in the book, and no English translation was offered for the three verses given.

One of the most famous contemporary versions of the song is performed by Mexican star Eugenia León.

The Spanish singer Raphael recorded La Llorona in the mid-1960s. The famous Azerbaijani singer Rashid Beibutov sang his version in the 60s. Joan Baez recorded La Llorona on her Gracias a la Vida album, originally released in March 1974.

Lila Downs recorded it on her 1999 album 'La Sandunga'.

In 2006, Dulce Pontes recorded a version in Portuguese, A chorona, on her album "O Coração Tem Três Portas".

Canadian guitarist Jesse Cook covered the song on his 2007 album Frontiers, where it is sung by Amanda Martinez.

Mexican singer Natalia Lafourcade covered the song on her album Musas Volumen 2 released in 2018.

Singer Ángela Aguilar, daughter of Pepe Aguilar, covered the song on her album Primero Soy Mexicana, also released in 2018. She later performed it at the 19th Annual Latin Grammy Awards with Aida Cuevas and Natalia Lafourcade.

Emilie-Claire Barlow covered the song on her 11th album Clear Day. Recorded with the Metropole Orkest conducted by Jules Buckley, this version features lyrics translated to the French as well as an original verse. It was arranged for orchestra by Emilie-Claire Barlow and Steve Webster;

In 2016, Gisela João recorded a cover of the song, which was released as the closing track of her second studio album, Nua.

In 2018, Spanish singer Alba Reche covered the song for Gala 6 of series 10 of Spanish TV show Operación Triunfo

=== Chavela Vargas ===
The late Chavela Vargas is known throughout the Americas for her songs of struggle, defiance, and triumph. When Vargas recorded the song in the 1950s, she remained loyal to the ranchera genre by making the guitar the primary instrument in the song. Although Vargas did remain true to the typical ranchera sound, she also created her own unique sound in the process. Carlos Gutierrez of Cinema Tropical explains "she took ranchero music and made the music her own. She stripped the music from the trumpet and other arrangements."

== Popular culture influence ==
=== Frida film ===
The song "La Llorona" appears in the film Frida (2002), about Frida Kahlo, directed by Julie Taymor and starring Mexican actress Salma Hayek. Chavela Vargas was invited for a special appearance, singing her version of "La Llorona". It is well known that Vargas was a close friend and a frequent house guest of Frida Kahlo and her husband Diego Rivera. Vargas was so close to Kahlo, that a short-lasting affair is speculated to have occurred between the two before Kahlo married Rivera.

In the film, Vargas plays the role of a ghost who consoles Kahlo. Kahlo had been drinking in a bar for some time when she notices a ghost sitting down at a nearby table. A black shawl, which references the song lyrics, is wrapped around the ghost and Kahlo initially is quite hesitant to approach her. As Kahlo is about to sit next to the ghost, the ghost reveals her face to Kahlo. Kahlo continues to listen to Vargas’ interpretation of the song, and becomes overwhelmed by her memories and begins to cry. Kahlo begins to remember the car accident that changed her life and also her turbulent past with her husband.

=== Coco film ===
The song "La Llorona" is featured in the 2017 Disney-Pixar film Coco; it is performed by Alanna Ubach as Imelda Rivera and Antonio Sol in a guest appearance as Ernesto de la Cruz in the English version and Angelica Vale and Marco Antonio Solis in the Spanish version. In the film, Imelda sings the song during the sunrise concert as she attempts to evade Ernesto who sings the song in duet with her. The song is also heard in the beginning, sung by a rowdy group of drunkards during the "No music!" montage, and briefly played by a mariachi guitarist getting a shoe shine from Miguel.

=== Penny Dreadful: City of Angels ===
Varga's song is featured in the opening and closing scenes of "Santa Muerte", the pilot episode of Penny Dreadful: City of Angels.

=== Terminator: Sarah Connor Chronicles ===
Composer Bear McCreary adapted the song for the episode "Mr. Ferguson is Ill Today" in Season 2 of Terminator: Sarah Connor Chronicles.

=== La Llorona film ===
A new arrangement of the song is heard during the end credits of the 2019 Guatemalan film La Llorona, written and directed by Jayro Bustamante. The lyrics are almost completely different from the best known version. In keeping with the film, this version abandons the legend in favor of a more political use of the song, referring to the genocide of the Maya-Ixil people of the Guatemalan highland during that country's civil war (1960s–1980s).
