= List of number-one Billboard Regional Mexican Songs of 2021 =

The Billboard Regional Mexican Songs is a subchart of the Latin Airplay chart that ranks the best-performing songs on Regional Mexican radio stations in the United States. Published weekly by Billboard magazine, it ranks the "most popular regional Mexican songs, ranked by radio airplay audience impressions as measured by Nielsen Music."

== Chart history ==
Key
†	Indicates best-performing song of 2021

Issue date	Song	Artist(s)	Ref.
January 2	"Te Volveria A Elegir" †	Calibre 50	
January 9	"Te Volveria A Elegir" †	Calibre 50	
January 16	"Te Volveria A Elegir" †	Calibre 50	
January 23	"Te Volveria A Elegir" †	Calibre 50	
January 30	"Dime Cómo Quieres"	Christian Nodal & Ángela Aguilar	
February 6	"Dime Cómo Quieres"	Christian Nodal & Ángela Aguilar	
February 13	"Dime Cómo Quieres"	Christian Nodal & Ángela Aguilar	
February 20	"Dime Cómo Quieres"	Christian Nodal & Ángela Aguilar	
February 27	"Dime Cómo Quieres"	Christian Nodal & Ángela Aguilar	
March 6	"Saludos A Mi Ex"	Edwin Luna and La Trakalosa de Monterrey	
March 13	"Yo Todo Lo Doy"	Alfredo Olivas	
March 20	"Saludos A Mi Ex"	Edwin Luna and La Trakalosa de Monterrey	
March 27	"La Casita"	Banda Sinaloense MS de Sergio Lizarraga	
April 3	"La Casita"	Banda Sinaloense MS de Sergio Lizarraga	
April 10	"La Casita"	Banda Sinaloense MS de Sergio Lizarraga	
April 17	"La Casita"	Banda Sinaloense MS de Sergio Lizarraga	
April 24	"Duele"	Alejandro Fernández and Christian Nodal	
May 1	"La Casita"	Banda Sinaloense MS de Sergio Lizarraga	
May 8	"Vamos Bien"	Calibre 50	
May 15	"La Casita"	Banda Sinaloense MS de Sergio Lizarraga	
May 22	"2 Veces"	Los Plebes del Rancho de Ariel Camacho and Christian Nodal	
May 29	"2 Veces"	Los Plebes del Rancho de Ariel Camacho and Christian Nodal	
June 5	"2 Veces"	Los Plebes del Rancho de Ariel Camacho and Christian Nodal	
June 12	"2 Veces"	Los Plebes del Rancho de Ariel Camacho and Christian Nodal	
June 19	"Mi Primer Derrota"	La Arrolladora Banda el Limon de Rene Camacho	
June 26	"Te Encontré"	Ulices Chaidez / Eslabon Armado	
July 3	"Calzones Finos"	Los Nuevos Federales	
July 10	"Ya Te La Sabes"	Julión Álvarez y Su Norteno Banda	
July 17	"Sin Miedo Al Exito"	Banda Los Sebastianes de Saul Plata	
July 24	"Ya Te La Sabes"	Julión Álvarez y Su Norteno Banda	
July 31	"Ya Te La Sabes"	Julión Álvarez y Su Norteno Banda	
August 7	"Ya Te La Sabes"	Julión Álvarez y Su Norteno Banda	
August 14	"Soy Buen Amigo"	El Fantasma	
August 21	"A La Antiguita"	Calibre 50	
August 28	"A La Antiguita"	Calibre 50	
September 4	"A La Antiguita"	Calibre 50	
September 11	"El Toxico"	Grupo Firme and Carin Leon	
September 18	"El Toxico"	Grupo Firme and Carin Leon	
September 25	"Tus Desprecios"	Pepe Aguilar and El Fantasma	
October 2	"Se Veia Venir"	Marco Antonio Solís	
October 9	"Que Tienen Tus Palabras?"	Banda El Recodo de Cruz Lizarraga	
October 16	"Tranquilito"	Gerardo Ortiz	
October 23	"Tranquilito"	Gerardo Ortiz	
October 30	"Ya Supérame (En Vivo Desde Culiacán, Sinaloa)"	Grupo Firme	
November 6	"Ya Supérame (En Vivo Desde Culiacán, Sinaloa)"	Grupo Firme	
November 13	"Ya Supérame (En Vivo Desde Culiacán, Sinaloa)"	Grupo Firme	
November 20	"Yo Soy Rico"	Los Dos Carnales	
November 27	"La Sinvergüenza"	Christian Nodal and Banda MS	
December 4	"La Sinvergüenza"	Christian Nodal and Banda MS	
December 11	"Como Te Olvido"	La Arrolladora Banda el Limon de Rene Camacho	
December 18	"Como Te Olvido"	La Arrolladora Banda el Limon de Rene Camacho	
December 25	"Ya Solo Eres Mi Ex"	La Addictiva	
