= Premio Lo Nuestro 2022 =

34th Lo Nuestro Awards
- Date: February 24, 2022
- Site: FTX Arena; Miami, Florida, USA
- Most wins: Bad Bunny (6)
- Most nominations: Camilo; Christian Nodal; J Balvin (10 each)

Television/radio coverage
- Network: Univision

The 34th Lo Nuestro Awards ceremony was held at the FTX Arena in Miami on February 24, 2022. Presented and televised by American television network Univision y Las Estrellas, the Lo Nuestro Awards recognized the most popular Spanish-language music of 2021 that was played on Uforia Audio Network during the year in 35 categories. Spanish singer David Bisbal, Mexican-American TV presenter Alejandra Espinoza, Mexican actor Gabriel Soto, and fellow Mexican singer Yuri hosted the ceremony.

Camilo, Christian Nodal, and J Balvin received the most nominations with ten. Bad Bunny received the most awards, with six, including Artist of the Year and Album of the Year for El Último Tour Del Mundo.

== Winners and nominees ==
The nominees for the 34th Lo Nuestro Awards were announced digitally on January 25, 2022, by Univision. The winners are listed in bold.

=== General ===
**Artist of the Year**: **Bad Bunny**; Ángela Aguilar; Camilo; Christian Nodal; Grupo Firme; J Balvin; Karol G; Maluma; Rauw Alejandro; Sebastián Yatra	**Album of the Year**: **El Último Tour Del Mundo – Bad Bunny**; Entre Mar y Palmeras (Live) – Juan Luis Guerra; Esta Vida Es Muy Bonita – Banda El Recodo de Cruz Lizárraga; Jose – J Balvin; KG0516 – Karol G; Leyendas – Carlos Rivera; Mexicana Enamorada – Ángela Aguilar; Mis Manos – Camilo; Utopía Live From Metlife Stadium – Romeo Santos; Vamos Bien – Calibre 50
**Song of the Year**: **"Bichota" – Karol G**; "Dakiti" – Bad Bunny & Jhay Cortez; "De Vuelta Pa’ La Vuelta" – Daddy Yankee & Marc Anthony; "Dime Cómo Quieres" – Christian Nodal &Ángela Aguilar; "Fiel" – Los Legendarios, Wisin & Jhay Cortez; "Pepas" – Farruko; "Telepatía" – Kali Uchis; "Todo de Ti" – Rauw Alejandro; "Vida de Rico" – Camilo; "Yo Todo Lo Doy" – Alfredo Olivas	**New Artist – Female**: **Ángela Aguilar**; Elena Rose; Evaluna Montaner; Kali Uchis; La Ross María; Majo Aguilar; María Becerra; The Change; VF7; Yendry
**New Artist – Male**: **El Alfa**; Blessd; Boza; Duki; El Fantasma; Feid; Khea; Los Dos Carnales; Santa Fe Klan; Tiago PZK	**Crossover collaboration of the Year**: ‘**In Da Ghetto’ – J Balvin & Skrillex**; ‘Del Mar’ – Ozuna, Doja Cat & Sia; ‘Don´t Be Shy’ – Tiesto & Karol G; ‘Girl Like Me’ (Remix) – Black Eyed Peas, Shakira & Twocolors; ‘Kesi (Remix)’ – Camilo & Shawn Mendes
**Remix of the Year**: **‘Ayer Me Llamó Mi Ex’ (Remix) – Khea, Natti Natasha & Prince Royce Ft. Lenny Santos**; ‘911’ (Remix) – Sech & Jhay Cortez; ‘Fiel’ (Remix) – Wisin, Jhay Cortez, Anuel AA Ft. Los Legendarios & Myke Towers; ‘La Tóxica’ (Remix) – Farruko, Sech, Myke Towers Ft. Jay Wheeler & Tempo; ‘Travesuras’ (Remix) – Nio García, Casper Mágico, Ozuna, Myke Towers, Wisin y Yandel & Flow La Movie	**Perfect Mix of The Year**: **‘Volví’ – Aventura & Bad Bunny**; ‘100 Años’ – Carlos Rivera, Maluma & Calibre 50; ‘Antes Que Salga El Sol’ – Natti Natasha & Prince Royce; ‘Botella Tras Botella’ – Gera Mx & Christian Nodal; ‘Canción Bonita’ – Carlos Vives & Ricky Martin; ‘Con La Falta Que Me Haces’ – Reik & Grupo Firme; ‘Cumbia A La Gente’ – Guaynna & Los Ángeles Azules; ‘De Vuelta Pa’ La Vuelta’ – Daddy Yankee & Marc Anthony; ‘Me Pasé’ – Enrique Iglesias Ft. Farruko; ‘Pareja Del Año’ – Sebastián Yatra & Myke Towers

=== Pop ===
**Pop Artist of the Year**: **Camilo**; Carlos Rivera; Luis Fonsi; Maluma; Mon Laferte; Ricardo Montaner; Ricky Martin; Rosalía; Sebastián Yatra; Selena Gomez	**Pop Album of the Year**: **Déja Vu – CNCO**; Desamorfosis – Thalía; El Amor En Los Tiempos Del Perreo – Piso 21; El Playlist De Anoche – Tommy Torres; La Más Bella – Ednita Nazario; Leyendas – Carlos Rivera; Mis Manos – Camilo; Revelación – Selena Gomez; Rifresh – Mau y Ricky; Sin Miedo (Del Amor y Otros Demonios) – Kali Uchis
**Pop Collaboration of the Year**: **‘Pareja Del Año’ – Sebastián Yatra & Myke Towers**; ‘Baila Conmigo’ – Selena Gomez & Rauw Alejandro; ‘Fan De Tus Fotos’ – Nicky Jam & Romeo Santos; ‘Perfecta’ – Reik & Maluma; ‘Vacío’ – Luis Fonsi & Rauw Alejandro	**Pop Song of the Year**: **‘Tan Enamorados’ – CNCO**; ‘Amén’ – Ricardo Montaner, Mau y Ricky, Camilo & Evaluna Montaner; ‘Eres Mi Religión’ – Maná & Joy; ‘Estar Enamorado’ – Carlos Rivera & Raphael; ‘Lo Intenté Todo’ – Reik & Jessie Reyez; ‘Se Nos Fue La Mano’ – Ednita Nazario & Luis Fonsi; ‘Siempre He Estado Aquí’ – RBD; ‘Telepatía’ – Kali Uchis; ‘Un Beso En Madrid’ – Tini & Alejandro Sanz; ‘Vida De Rico’ – Camilo
**Pop Group or Duo of the Year**: **CNCO**; Mau y Ricky; Morat; Piso 21; Reik	**Pop/Ballad Song of the Year**: **‘Amén’ – Ricardo Montaner, Mau y Ricky, Camilo & Evaluna Montaner**; ‘Estar Enamorado’ – Carlos Rivera & Raphael; ‘Se Nos Fue La Mano’ – Ednita Nazario & Luis Fonsi; ‘Te Hubieras Ido Antes’ – Reik; ‘Volaré’ – Nella & Pedro Capó

=== Urban ===
**Female Urban Artist of the Year**: **Karol G**; Anitta; Becky G; Cazzu; Emilia; Farina; María Becerra; Mariah Angeliq; Natti Natasha; Nicki Nicole	**Male Urban Artist of the Year**: **Bad Bunny**; Daddy Yankee; Farruko; J Balvin; Jhay Cortez; Justin Quiles; Myke Towers; Ozuna; Rauw Alejandro; Wisin
**Urban Song of the Year**: **‘Bichota’ – Karol G**; ‘Antes’ – Anuel AA & Ozuna; ‘Ayer Me Llamo Mi Ex’ (Remix) – Khea, Natti Natasha & Prince Royce Ft. Lenny Santos; ‘Dákiti’ – Bad Bunny & Jhay Cortez; ‘Fiel’ – Los Legendarios, Wisin & Jhay Cortez; ‘La Nota’ – Manuel Turizo, Rauw Alejandro & Myke Towers; ‘Loco’ – Justin Quiles, Chimbala & Zion y Lennox; ‘Pepas’ – Farruko; ‘Problema’ – Daddy Yankee; ‘Tu Veneno’ – J Balvin	**Urban Collaboration of the Year**: **‘AM’ (Remix) – Nio García, J Balvin & Bad Bunny**; ‘Amor En Coma’ – Manuel Turizo & Maluma; ‘Ayer Me Llamo Mi Ex’ (Remix) – Khea, Natti Natasha & Prince Royce Ft. Lenny Santos; ‘Dime Dónde’ – Cazzu & Justin Quiles; ‘Fulanito’ – Becky G & El Alfa; ‘Antes’ – Anuel AA & Ozuna; ‘La Noche De Anoche’ – Bad Bunny & Rosalía; ‘Location’ – Karol G, Anuel AA & J Balvin; ‘Mi Niña’ – Wisin, Los Legendarios & Myke Towers; ‘Patria y Vida’ – Yotuel, Gente De Zona, Descemer Bueno, Maykel Osorbo & El Funky
**Urban Album of the Year**: **El Último Tour Del Mundo – Bad Bunny**; Jose - J Balvin; KG0516 – Karol G; La 167 – Farruko; La Última Promesa – Justin Quiles; Los Favoritos 2.5 – Arcángel; Los Legendarios 001 – Los Legendarios; Nattividad – Natti Natasha; Timelezz – Jhayco; Vice Versa – Rauw Alejandro	**Urban/Pop Song of the Year**: **‘Qué Más Pues?’ – J Balvin & María Becerra**; ‘Antes Que Salga El Sol’ – Natti Natasha & Prince Royce; ‘La Tóxica’ – Farruko; ‘Sobrio’ – Maluma; ‘Todo de Ti’ – Rauw Alejandro

=== Tropical ===
**Tropical Artist of the Year**: **Romeo Santos**; Carlos Vives; Juan Luis Guerra 4.40; La India; Luis Figueroa; Marc Anthony; Milly Quezada; Olga Tañón; Prince Royce; Víctor Manuelle	**Tropical Song of the Year**: **‘Bebé’ – Camilo & El Alfa**; ‘Canción Bonita’ – Carlos Vives & Ricky Martin; ‘Cómo Olvidar (Version 2021)’ – Olga Tañón y Jay Wheeler; ‘De Vuelta Pa’ La Vuelta’ – Daddy Yankee & Marc Anthony; ‘Dios Así Lo Quiso’ – Ricardo Montaner & Juan Luis Guerra 4.40; ‘Hasta El Sol De Hoy’ – Luis Figueroa; ‘Lotería’ – Prince Royce; ‘Tengo Un Dios’ – Silvestre Dangond; ‘Un Amor Eterno’ – Marc Anthony; ‘Víctimas Las Dos’ – Víctor Manuelle & La India
**Tropical Collaboration of the Year**: **‘De Vuelta Pa’ La Vuelta’ – Daddy Yankee & Marc Anthony**; ‘Búscame’ – Kany García & Carlos Vives; ‘Lo Veo y No Lo Creo’ – Willy García & Gilberto Santa Rosa; ‘Señor Juez’ – Ozuna & Anthony Santos; ‘Víctimas Las Dos’ – Víctor Manuelle & La India
