= Mexicana Enamorada =

Studio album by Ángela Aguilar
- Released: September 24, 2021
- Recorded: Early 2020 - 2021 at Rancho El Soyate (Villanueva, Zacatecas, Mexico)
- Genre: Mariachi; country; pop
- Length: 36:57
- Language: Spanish
- Label: Machin
- Producer: Pepe Aguilar

Ángela Aguilar chronology
| Primero Soy Mexicana (2018) | Mexicana Enamorada (2021) |

Mexicana Enamorada (Mexicana in Love) is the second solo studio album, and third overall, by Mexican singer Ángela Aguilar. It was released to the market under the record label Machin Records on September 24, 2021. The album was produced by Aguilar's father, Mexican singer Pepe Aguilar.

A week after the release, the CD was released exclusively to Sanborns. It features the collaborations of the Mexican singer-songwriter Christian Nodal and the Mexican duo Jesse & Joy. The name of the album is a reference to the Mexican film Enamorada (1946) starring María Félix.

== Background and recording ==
After the release of his second album Primero Soy Mexicana in 2018, Aguilar had clarified that he had been working on the next one since the middle of 2020, in October of that same year he released the collaboration "Dime Cómo Quieres" with Christian Nodal that achieved great success in Mexico and other Latin American countries. At the end of 2020 is when the production of the album begins, among the composers of the album's melodies, Ángela Aguilar herself is making her debut as a composer, along with Ana Bárbara, Joss Favela, Gussy Lau, Edgar Barrera, Christian Nodal, Jesse & Joy and Ale Zeguer.

Aguilar explained for the television channel Bandamax:

Este disco me ha enseñado a tener paciencia, a pisar lento, fuerte, seguro y honesto. Ojalá puedan identificarse con las canciones, ojalá que les pueda ayudar de alguna manera, ojalá que nos conecté un poco más. Espero les guste. Una Mexicana Enamorada, Ángela"

It also includes a new version of "La Malagueña", in honor of her late grandmother, the actress Flor Silvestre. Being this the only non-unreleased song of the project, something different from his previous work that consisted mostly of versions.

== Cover ==
Aguilar appears on the cover accompanied by hidden meanings of things and interests that represent important moments in her life.

Ángela Aguilar in an interview for ¡Hola!:

"Les presento esta portada llena de significados ocultos, desde flores silvestres de Guanajuato a milagritos representando cosas importantes en mi vida. Hasta un cielo rojo me respalda. Agradecida con todas las personas que hicieron esto posible. Ni en mis sueños la vida se ve tan bonita. Yo siempre veía las portadas como una foto linda y ya, yo quería cambiar eso y ponerle un poco más de significado. Por ejemplo, me ven con el pelo largo porque mi abuela Flor [Silvestre] siempre me quería ver con el largo y le decía a mi papá "Pepe por favor ya deja que tenga el pelo largo".

English Translation:

"I present to you this cover full of hidden meanings, from wild flowers from Guanajuato to little miracles representing important things in my life. Even a red sky supports me. Grateful to all the people who made this possible. Not even in my dreams does life look so beautiful. I always saw the covers as a pretty photo and now, I wanted to change that and give it a little more meaning. For example, they see me with long hair because my grandmother Flor [Silvestre] always wanted to see me with long hair and I used to tell my dad "Pepe, please, let me have long hair".

According to Aguilar, her father always explained to Mrs. Silvestre that this style was part of her characteristic image as a celebrity. But when her grandmother died, she decided to grow her hair long. Seeing a photographer's excited reaction at a photo shoot with her new image, she decided that this would be her image in the final photo for the album cover.

In the image, Aguilar serves as the central element, while more details are added to form a traditional Mexican composition. The cover has Mexican miracles and each one is attributed a meaning. The horse represents the time when he began to ride more strictly. The golden eyes are her new vision of her music and her mariachi, another tribute to Mrs. Silvestre on the cover, in addition to her hairstyle, were the traditional wild flowers of Guanajuato, her grandmother's region of origin; Finally, the reddish color symbolizes love and your heart.

In the physical CD format, a booklet designed by the artists Erick Nieto, Irving de Jesús Segovia (Tuxamee) and Ricardo Xavier Cortés Fernández (Ricardo XCF) is included, it also includes the photographs taken by Jordi Koalitic. In addition to 2 sheets of stickers designed by Aguilar.

== Commercial reception ==
The album reached the first place in digital sales on iTunes Mexico and number 29 on iTunes Spain, and debuted with 145 million streams on Spotify Global in the top 5 of release. Debuted at number 90 on the Billboard Global 200 chart and peaked at number 89, becoming the first song by Mexican artists to enter the international hits list, reached number one on Billboard's Mexico Airplay chart for seven consecutive weeks and to the first place in the Regional Mexican Airplay for five consecutive weeks, in addition to reaching the first place in other countries such as Chile, Honduras and Guatemala. The second single "In reality" reached number 8 on the Latin Digital Songs chart, and the third single in collaboration with Jesse & Joy "Ella Qué Te Dio" reached number 3 on the Mexico Popular Airplay. All singles of the album managed to enter the top ten places on Billboard's popularity charts in Mexico and Latin music.

== Track listing ==
Credits taken from YouTube Music:

| No. | Title | Writer(s) | Length |
|---|---|---|---|
| 1. | "Ahí Donde Me Ven" | René Humberto Lau Ibarra | 4:05 |
| 2. | "Yo No Sé" | Adam Castañeda | 2:48 |
| 3. | "Fuera de Servicio" | Ángela Aguilar | 3:26 |
| 4. | "En Realidad" | Altagracia Ugalde Mota | 3:26 |
| 5. | "Se Disfrazó" | René Humberto Lau Ibarra | 3:27 |
| 6. | "Te Quiero Para Mí" | José Alberto Inzunza Favela | 4:48 |
| 7. | "Ella Qué Te Dio" (with Jesse & Joy) | Alejandra Zéguer · Blanca Rodríguez · Tirzah Joy Huerta Uecke · Jesse Eduardo Huerta Uecke | 3:49 |
| 8. | "Dime Cómo Quieres" (with Christian Nodal) | Edgar Barrera · Christian Jesús González Nodal | 2:51 |
| 9. | "Inevitable" | Ángela Aguilar | 2:59 |
| 10. | "La Malagueña" | Pedro Galindo Galarza · Elpidio Ramírez | 5:25 |

== Release history ==
| Region | Date | Format | Edition | Ref. |
|---|---|---|---|---|
| Several | September 24, 2021 | Streaming, digital download | Standard | |
| Mexico | October 1, 2021 | CD | Standard | |
