= El Cambio =

Studio album by Miguel de la Bastide
- Released: 1998
- Genre: Flamenco
- Length: 48:23
- Label: La Bastide Productions

Miguel de la Bastide chronology
| El Cambio (1998) | Siento (2003) |

El Cambio is the debut studio album by Miguel de la Bastide. It was recorded at La Bastide Productions and mastered by George Graves at Lacquer Channel in Toronto Canada in 1998. The track "Calle Torrecillo del Leal" was mixed by Jesse Cook at his recording studio, which was stated in the liner notes and also in an article in "20th Century Guitar Magazine".

The album contains four re-recorded tracks that were previously released under the Narada Productions label onto various Flamenco and Nuevo Flamenco compilations. "Morir Soñando" was previously recorded in 1996 as "Morí Soñando" and was one of his first contributions to the compilation Flamenco: Fire and Grace. The other was "Viajeros", which was originally titled "Viajero". "Calle Torrecillo del Leal" was originally titled "Torrecillo del Leal" on the compilation Gypsy Passion in 1997. "A Mi Carmen" was originally titled "Mi Carmen" on the compilation Gypsy Soul in 1998.

Two tracks from the album were later included in Narada compilations: "Candela" was his contribution to Gypsy Fire in early 2000 and a shortened version of the title track, renamed "El Cambio (edit)" on Viva Flamenco! in the later part of 2000, which was the highly anticipated sequel to "Flamenco: Fire and Grace".

== Track listing ==
1. "El Cambio" – 7:10
2. "A Mi Carmen" – 4:41
3. "Arrimate” – 4:53
4. "Candela" – 3:27
5. "Calle Torrecillo del Leal" – 5:40
6. "Morir Soñando" – 5:03
7. "Viajeros" – 5:33
8. "Alma Libre" – 10:45 (Contains a hidden track "Soleá")

== Musicians ==
- Miguel de la Bastide - Flamenco guitar and palmas
- Mario Melo - percussions and palmas (track 6)
- Debashis Sinha - tables and udu drum (track 2 and 6)
- Rudy Bolanos - bass
- David Slater - sax and flute
- Alfonso Mogaburo Cid - singer
- Carmen Romero - palmas
