= Siento =

Siento may refer to:

- Siento (Yolandita Monge album)
- Siento (Miguel de la Bastide album)
- Siento (Sasha Sokol album)
