= Flor Silvestre (album) =

Studio album by Flor Silvestre
- Released: 1959
- Recorded: 1957–1959
- Genre: Ranchera; waltz
- Label: Musart Records

Flor Silvestre chronology
Flor Silvestre (1959)	Flor Silvestre con el Mariachi México (1963)

Flor Silvestre is a studio album by Mexican singer Flor Silvestre, released in 1959 by Musart Records. It is Flor Silvestre's first Musart album and contains the hit singles she recorded for the label in the late 1950s.

The album was reissued several times in its original LP format. In 2008, an abridged version of the album, Laguna de pesares, was released digitally.

== Background ==
This is Flor Silvestre's first studio album for Musart. Flor had only recorded singles and tracks for soundtrack albums prior to the release of this album.

According to the liner notes, Musart took "great care in choosing songs that are most appropriate for the style and tessitura of such a unique singer [Flor Silvestre]".

== Critical reception ==
In its review of the album, Gráfica magazine commented: "This album comes to us with the very own feeling of Flor Silvestre, who, with her voice, knows how to give color and nuance to each interpretation and proves it to us in the songs".

== Track listing ==
Side one

No.	Title	Writer(s)	Length
1.	"El ramalazo"	Tomás Méndez
2.	"Qué bonito amor"	José Alfredo Jiménez
3.	"Te fuiste y qué"	Federico Curiel
4.	"Por su culpa"	José Pantoja
5.	"La flor de la canela"	Chabuca Granda
6.	"Échame a mí la culpa"	José Ángel Espinoza

Side two

No.	Title	Writer(s)	Length
1.	"Ay el amor"	Tomás Méndez
2.	"Lágrimas del alma"	Bony Villaseñor
3.	"Laguna de pesares"	Tomás Méndez
4.	"Quién te lo dijo"	Tomás Méndez
5.	"Amémonos"	Manuel María Flores (lyrics); Carlos Montbrun Ocampo (music)
6.	"Todo se paga en la vida"	David Záizar; Juan Záizar

== Personnel ==
- Mariachi México – accompaniment
- Mariachi Zapopan – accompaniment
