= Lola Beltrán discography =

The discography of Mexican singer Lola Beltran includes more than a hundred recorded albums and the sale of tens of millions. Popularly referred to as "La Reina" or "The Queen", she was recognized as one of the most popular female singers in Mexico.

== Selected discography ==
- Cucurrucucú Paloma (1954)
- Canciones De Mi Tierra (1955)
- Que Si Te Quiero, Juralo (1956)
- Lola Beltran Con El Mariachi Guadalajara de Silvestre Vargas – Cuatro Copas (1957)
- Pelea de Gallos (1957)
- Donde Las Dan, Las Toman (1957)
- Alma Cancionera (1960)
- Asi Canta La Reina De La Canción Ranchera (1961)
- Voz E Inspiracion (Interpretando Los Mayores Exitos de Tomas Mendez S. (1962)
- Canciones Y Huapangos (1964)
- Con Mis Propias Manos (1965)
- Los Pinos (1965)
- Que Quieres (1966)
- Solito Mejor Solito (1966)
- La Negra (1968)
- Joyas (1969)
- Canta Las Canciones Mas Bonitas de Jose Alfredo Jimenez (1969)
- ¡Mejor Que Nunca! (1969)
- La Gran Lola de Mexico (1969)
- Llanto y Coraje (1970)
- Así Sólo... (1971)
- Interpreta A Cornelio (1971)
