= Miguel de la Bastide =

- Miguel de la Bastide, Singapore 2002

Background information
- Born: November 1962 (age 63)
- Origin: San Fernando, Trinidad and Tobago
- Genres: Flamenco music
- Occupations: Composer, Guitarist
- Instrument: Guitar
- Years active: 1992–present
- Website: www.migueldelabastide.net

Miguel de la Bastide is a Trinidad-born Flamenco composer and virtuoso guitarist who first appeared on the scene in 1996 on the CD compilation Flamenco: Fire and Grace under the record label Narada Productions that placed him alongside some of Spain's most prominent guitarists, including Paco de Lucía, Tomatito and Rafael Riqueni to name a few. Since then, he has appeared on numerous other Flamenco and Nuevo Flamenco compilations. He is the only guitarist from Trinidad and Tobago that has had success recording in the flamenco genre and is also a recipient of the Chalmers Award and Toronto Arts Council Award.

== Biography ==
Miguel de la Bastide was born in San Fernando, Trinidad and Tobago in 1962. He is an alumnus of Naparima College and began playing guitar in his mid-teens. In 1981, he immigrated to Toronto, Canada at the age of 18.

In Canada, he studied with Allan Torok, David Phillips, Guillermo Rios and Jose Valle Fajardo "Chuscales". In Spain at Amor de Dios – Centro de Flamenco y Danza Española, he studied with Lorenzo Uirseda Barca, Léo Avellaneda Molina, La Tati, Ciro, Cristobal Reyes, Paco Romero, Javier Cruz and Domingo Ortega.

In 1992, he became the music director for Compañia Carmen Romero where he wrote original scores for their various music and dance productions that were performed in Canada, US, France, Spain and Singapore. In 1998, the music of the company's second production Flamenco de Ayer y Hoy was to become Miguel's first solo album El Cambio. A video for El Cambio, directed by Dan Eisen was released through Bravo! in 2000. Also in 2000, under the direction of Philip Stanger of Stanger Productions, he recorded all the flamenco guitar segments in the world-released television series Queen of Swords. In 2003, he had the pleasure of being double billed with Martin Taylor (guitarist) in Singapore at the Esplanade - Theatres on the Bay. Later in 2003, his second solo album Siento was released and in 2005, four tracks were selected by Somerset Entertainment for a three CD compilation Mistica – The Passion of the Spanish Guitar. Six other tracks from his album El Cambio was also selected and placed on the same compilation album. In 2007, he toured through North America with the International Guitar Night ensemble where he recorded the International Guitar Night II live album with Brian Gore (US), D'Gary (Madagascar) and Clive Carroll (UK) under the Pacific Music label. In 2008, he toured through the United Kingdom with the International Guitar Night ensemble with Brian Gore (US), Andy Sheppard (Canada) and Cecilia Zabala (Argentina). In 2008, he recorded and co-arranged the cut Spanish Love Affair from Terrence Howard's album Shine Through It (Sony/BMG).

Miguel served on staff at The Royal Conservatory of Music in Toronto, Canada between 2003 and 2005 and he had his first published interview on 20th Century Guitar Magazine in the February 2004 issue entitled Fire and Grace – The Gypsy Soul of Flamenco Guitarist Miguel de la Bastide.

Miguel was featured in the Max Montalvo's documentary film "El Payo", that premiered in Toronto on 28 May 2010. The documentary outlines the life of the late David Phillips, one of Miguel's prominent teachers.

On 23 April 2010, he performed his music for the first time with the International Symphony Orchestra as guest artist for their end of season "Danza Finale", with Jerome David Summers as conductor and music director.

On 21 June 2011, Miguel contributed to the soundtrack CD for the documentary film "El Payo". His piece is entitled "Los Sueños Sí Se Hacen Realidad".

Since 1992, Miguel has performed extensively in North America, Europe and Asia.

Currently resides in the area of the French River and Sudbury where he performs and teaches.

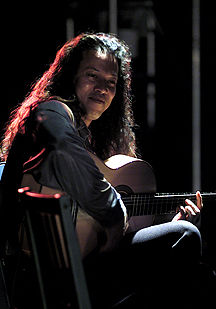
Miguel de la Bastide in Singapore 2002

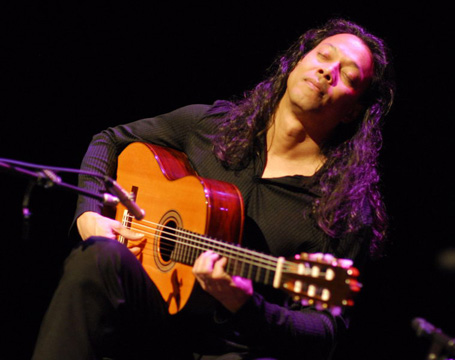
Miguel in British Columbia, Canada 2007

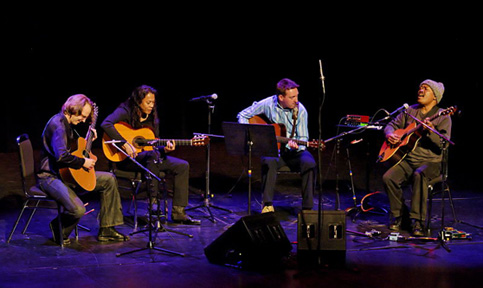
IGN 2007 in BC. L to R: Brian Gore, Miguel de la Bastide, Clive Carroll and D'Gary

== Discography ==
=== Studio albums ===
- El Cambio (1998)
- Siento (2003)

=== Compilations ===
- Flamenco: Fire and Grace (1996 – Narada Productions)
- Gypsy Passion (1997 – Narada Productions)
- Narada World: A Global Vision – 15 Years of World Music (1997 – Narada Productions)
- Gypsy Soul (1998 – Narada Productions)
- Narada Showcase Collection (1998 – Narada Productions)
- Narada Guitar: 15 Years of Collected Works (1998 – Narada Productions)
- Gypsy Fire (2000 – Narada Productions)
- Viva Flamenco! (2000 – Narada Productions)
- Best of Narada New Flamenco Guitar (2003 – Narada Productions)
- Mistica – The Passion of the Spanish Guitar (2005 – Somerset Entertainment)
- International Guitar Night II (2007 – Pacific Music)
- El Payo – From The Film (2011)

=== Other ===
- Jesse Cook's "Vertigo" on hidden track, "Wednesday Night at Etric's" (1998 – Narada)
- Irshad Khan's "Awakening" track 4, "For You, My Love" (1999)
- Terrence Howard's "Shine Through It" track 6, "Spanish Love Affair" (2008 – Sony/BMG)

=== Video ===
- Made an appearance on Jesse Cook's "Tempest" music video (1995)
- El Cambio music video directed by Dan Eisen (2000)
- Rogers DayTime television, live interview and performed three pieces from El Cambio (2000)
- El Payo directed by Max Montalvo (2010)
