= Malagueña Salerosa =

Son song from Mexico

External audio
- La Malagueña; Sung by Miguel Aceves Mejía; YouTube Art Track provided by RCA Records

Malagueña Salerosa — also known as La Malagueña — is a well-known Son Huasteco or Huapango song from Mexico, which has been covered more than 200 times by recording artists.

The song is that of a man telling a woman (from Málaga, Spain) how beautiful she is, and how he would love to be her man, but that he understands her rejecting him for being too poor.

Malagueña Salerosa is attributed to Elpidio Ramírez and Pedro Galindo, published by Peer International in 1947 (monitored by BMI), although Mexican composer Nicandro Castillo questions the validity of that authorship. As he mentions:

The issue is controversial because ... [Hidalguense composer] don Nicandro Castillo wrote that several tunes from la Huasteca which in decades past were known as huapangos, composed by Elpidio Ramírez, Roque Ramírez and Pedro Galindo, were actually anonymous songs, as was the case of Cielito Lindo and La Malagueña, which like La Guasanga or El Sacamandú, were in the public domain, written "long before the construction of the Cathedral of Huejutla".

== Recordings ==
Many have recorded and played this song, in particular Tríos huastecos, Mariachis and Bolero Trios. But the most famous version was made by Miguel Aceves Mejía with his mariachi. With Huapangos or Son Huastecos, the falsetto technique is used to great effect, as in David Záizar's version. Quite a few versions of the song feature vocal gymnastics by whoever sings them, particularly the stretching of vowels such as the "e" sound in the gentilic 'Malagueña' for as long as the singer can hold the note. Other known mariachi versions of the song were recorded by:

- Miguel Aceves Mejía
- Angela Aguilar
- Antonio Aguilar
- Antonio Aguilar and Joselito
- Ramón Vargas
- Mariachi Vargas
- David Záizar.

Tríos huastecos that have played this song include:

- Los Camperos de Valles
- Trio Chicontepec
- Trio resplandor huasteco

Bolero trio versions were recorded by:

- Los Panchos
- Los Tres Ases
- Rafael Méndez on his album Mendez and Almeida Together

This song became known internationally and has been recorded by such artists as:

- Angela Aguilar (granddaughter of Antonio Aguilar & daughter of Pepe Aguilar) 2021
- Nancy Ames on her 1964 all Spanish album This Is The Girl That Is.
- Avenged Sevenfold released a version of the song in 2017 Avenged Sevenfold – Malagueña Salerosa, adding metal elements to the song.
- In the opening title sequence of the movie Once Upon a Time in Mexico, Antonio Banderas is seen "playing" on guitar a version of Malagueña Salerosa, recorded by Chingon, members of group Del Castillo of Austin, Texas and director/producer/editor Robert Rodriguez, with orchestral backing.
- Alla Bayanova was recorded in Romania in 70 years on long-playing record. She sang this song in Romanian.
- Ray Boguslav in 1961 on the album Curfew shall not ring tonight Ray Boguslav – Curfew Shall Not Ring Tonight – MF359
- Bomba Estéreo
- Luiz Bonfá on his 1965 album The Brazilian Scene and his 1965 collaboration with singer Maria Toledo, Braziliana.
- The Brothers Comatose & Mariachi Oliveros 2022 – YouTube
- Bud & Travis on their 1959 album Bud and Travis.
- Los Caballeros
- Tex-mex band Chingón recorded it for the 2004 soundtrack of Kill Bill: Volume 2 Kill Bill 2 Soundtrack – Malaguena Salerosa. They also performed it live – YouTube.
- Chitãozinho & Xororó in 2006 on their album Vida Marvada
- The Italian band El Cuento de la Chica y la Tequila recorded "Malagueña Salerosa" on their 2013 EP The Wounded Healer.
- Carol Cisneros
- Plácido Domingo on his 1999 album 100 Años de Mariachi, which won a Grammy Award for Best Mexican-American Performance PLACIDO DOMINGO LA MALAGUENA SALEROSA.
- José Feliciano (who performed both this song and Malagueña by Ernesto Lecuona.)
- French Latino on the album Suerte, 2013
- John Gary, American vocalist, sang it on the 1967 albums Spanish Moonlight and Carnegie Hall Concert.
- Anna German
- The Iranian singer Googoosh.
- The Texan folksinger Tish Hinojosa sang it on her 1991 album Aquella Noche
- Harry James on his 1966 album The Ballads And The Beat! (Dot DLP 3669 and DLP 25669).
- Yugoslav and Montenegrin singer Nikola Karović recorded Malagueña in 1964 as a single album, and it sold more than 1 million copies.
- Kathy Kirby, whose 1963 UK hit (#17) "You're the One" set English lyrics, by Marcel Stellman, to the melody of "Malagueña Salerosa".
- The Limeliters on their 1960 album The Limeliters.
- Trini Lopez on his 1964 album The Latin Album, however, wasn't released as a single until 1968.
- Helmut Lotti in 2000 on the album Latino Classics.
- Paco de Lucía on his 1967 album Dos guitarras flamencas en América Latina
- Lydia Mendoza
- Gaby Moreno performed it on A Prairie Home Companion in 2016 La Malagueña – Gaby Moreno | Live from Here with Chris Thile.
- Nana Mouskouri on her 1991 album Nuestras Canciones.
- Estela Núñez on her 1972 album Estela Nuñez con el Mariachi Vargas de Tecalitlán.
- Eddie Palmieri on his 1998 album El Rumbero del Piano.
- Luis Alberto del Paraná y su Trio Los Paraguayos on their 1959 album Sentimentally Yours
- Sława Przybylska recorded it in Polish in 1959
- Juan Reynoso
- Cowboy music group Riders in the Sky on their 1994 album Cowboys in Love and their 2003 album Riders in the Sky Silver Jubilee
- Românticos de Cuba, Brazil
- Ronstadt Generaciones y los Tucsonenses
- The French singer Olivia Ruiz in 2003 on her album J'aime pas l'amour, and then again on her 2008 Spanish-language album La Chica Chocolate.
- Pablito Ruiz
- Sandler and Young
- The Croatian singer Massimo Savić in 1988 on his album Riječi čarobne (Magic Words).
- Trio Los Angeles in 1973, reaching the Dutch pop charts. It was produced by Hans Vermeulen and played by the band Sandy Coast.
- The Tubes performed the song on their 1975 debut album, and the song was also a feature single.
- Caterina Valente in 1955, who also performed Malagueña composed by Ernesto Lecuona.
- The Iranian singer Viguen who sang La Malagueña in Persian. He has a Spanish version as well.
- Popular Filipino singer Victor Wood, who was dubbed during the 1970s as a Jukebox King along with fellow singer Eddie Peregrina made the song popular in the Philippines.
