= Paloma Negra =

Song by Chavela Vargas

from the album Chavela Vargas
- Released: 1961
- Recorded: 1961
- Genre: Ranchera
- Length: 3:18
- Label: RCA Victor
- Songwriter: Tomás Méndez

"Paloma Negra" (Black Dove) is a ranchera song written by Tomás Méndez and originally released by Chavela Vargas in 1961 on her self-titled debut album. The song was later featured on the soundtrack to the Academy Award-nominated biopic Frida.

"Paloma Negra" has been covered by prominent artists such as Lola Beltrán, Vicente Fernández, Ángela Aguilar, Lila Downs, Rocio Jurado, Vikki Carr, and Jenni Rivera.
