= Tempest (Jesse Cook album) =

Studio album by Jesse Cook
- Released: September 26, 1995
- Genre: New-age, flamenco
- Length: 40:03
- Label: Narada

Jesse Cook chronology
Tempest (1995)	Gravity (1996)

Tempest is the debut album by Jesse Cook. He played guitar, palmas, synthesizer, djembe, and percussion with Mario Melo on congas, percussion, and palmas, Blake Manning on darbuka, timbali, and Andrew Morales on bass guitar. Part of the album's publicity was gained after the tracks "Tempest" and "Breeze from Saintes Maries" were used by an Ontario cable TV operator as background music for their TV program listing channel. The tracks were played in a loop for many months, "growing" on many viewers to the point they called the cable operator to inquire about it.

== Track listing ==
1. "Tempest" – 3:02
2. "Cascada" – 3:10
3. "Breeze from Saintes Maries" – 5:22
4. "Baghdad" – 4:21
5. "Parasol" – 5:36
6. "Dance of Spring" – 4:26
7. "Soledad" – 3:05
8. "Orbit" – 3:09
9. "Fate (Parasol Reprise)" – 5:07
10. "Jumpstart" – 3:05

All selections composed by Jesse Cook.
