= Flor Silvestre con el Mariachi México =

Studio album by Flor Silvestre
- Released: 1963
- Genre: Ranchera; bolero; waltz
- Label: Musart

Flor Silvestre chronology
Flor Silvestre (1958)	Flor Silvestre con el Mariachi México (1963)	Flor Silvestre con el Mariachi México, vol. 2 (1964)

Flor Silvestre con el Mariachi México is a studio album by Mexican singer Flor Silvestre, released by Musart Records. It is Flor Silvestre's second Musart album and contains her 1961 version of "Cielo rojo", one of her signature songs.

It was a great success, and all twelve of its tracks were included in the greatest hits album Los éxitos de Flor Silvestre.

== Background ==
This is Flor Silvestre's second studio album for Musart. It features her hit singles from the early 1960s as well as "Échame a mí la culpa" and "Amémonos", two tracks from her previous Musart album, Flor Silvestre. She is accompanied by Pepe Villa's Mariachi México on all tracks except "Amémonos", which she recorded with the Mariachi Zapopan.

== Track listing ==
Side one

No.	Title	Writer(s)	Length
1.	"Cielo rojo"	Juan Zaizar
2.	"Pa' todo el año"	José Alfredo Jiménez
3.	"Duda"	Rubén Fuentes; Rafael Cárdenas
4.	"Cariño bonito"	Cuco Sánchez
5.	"Échame a mí la culpa"	"Ferrusquilla"
6.	"Renunciación"	Antonio Valdés Herrera

Side two

No.	Title	Writer(s)	Length
1.	"Desolación"	Manuel S. Acuña
2.	"El peor de los caminos"	José Alfredo Jiménez
3.	"Tu capricho"	Raúl Alcántara
4.	"Aquel inmenso amor"	Roberto Cantoral
5.	"Amémonos"	Flores; Montbrun; Ocampo
6.	"Para morir iguales"	José Alfredo Jiménez

== Personnel ==
- Mariachi México de Pepe Villa – accompaniment
- Mariachi Zapopan – accompaniment
