= The Rumba Foundation =

Studio album by Jesse Cook
- Released: September 29, 2009
- Genres: New flamenco, world fusion, ethno-jazz
- Label: Koch Records

Jesse Cook chronology
Frontiers (2007)	The Rumba Foundation (2009)	The Blue Guitar Sessions (2012)

The Rumba Foundation is the seventh studio album by New Flamenco artist Jesse Cook. It was released on September 29, 2009.

== Track listing ==
All songs written by Jesse Cook unless otherwise noted.

No.	Title	Writer(s)	Length
1.	"Bogota By Bus"		3:06
2.	"Santa Marta"		3:50
3.	"Tuesday's Child"		4:00
4.	"Manolo's Lament"	Jesse Cook; Juan Alberto Fernandez Polo	3:31
5.	"Improv 1"		0:31
6.	"La Rumba d'El Jefe"		3:37
7.	"Improv 2"		0:16
8.	"Gaita"		4:45
9.	"Rain Day"		3:28
10.	"Bombay Diner"		4:20
11.	"Afternoon at Satie's"		3:17
12.	"Cecilia"	Paul Simon	3:46
13.	"Homebound"	Jesse Cook; Chris Church	4:44
Total length:			43:02

== Charts and certifications ==
Region	Certification
Canada (Music Canada)	Gold
