= Free Fall (Jesse Cook album) =

Studio album by Jesse Cook
- Released: September 26, 2000
- Genre: New flamenco, world fusion, ethno-jazz
- Length: 55:38
- Label: Narada
- Producer: Jesse Cook

Jesse Cook chronology
Vertigo (1998)	Free Fall (2000)	Nomad (2003)

Free Fall is the fourth studio album by the New Flamenco artist Jesse Cook. Musicians vary by track, including Jesse Cook, Art Avalos, Mario Melo, Paul Antonio, Etric Lyons, Steven Greenman, Ron Allen, Rick Shadrach Lazar, Djivan Gasparyan, George Gao, Ron Allen, Kathleen Kajioka, Nancy Cardwell, Danny Wilde, Peter Cardinali, and Kevin Laliberte. "Fall At Your Feet" has a live performance of "Mario Takes a Walk" appended to it. The album was certified Platinum by the CRIA in October 2001. Cook pairs with Danny Wilde for a cover of the Crowded House hit "Fall at Your Feet".

== Track listing ==
1. "Switchback" – 4:04
2. "Air" – 3:26
3. "Virtue" – 4:07
4. "Free Fall" – 4:22
5. "Paloma" – 4:10
6. "Incantation" – 4:50
7. "All That Remains" – 3:15
8. "On Walks the Night" – 6:36
9. "Querido Amigo" – 3:29
10. "Viva" – 4:20
11. "Fall At Your Feet" – 3:38/ – 12:45

All songs written by Jesse Cook—except "Fall at your Feet." "Fall at your Feet" was written by Neil Finn of Crowded House and recorded on their album "Woodface" in 1991.

== Year-end charts ==
2000 year-end chart performance for Free Fall by Jesse Cook
Chart (2000)	Position
Canadian Albums (Nielsen SoundScan)	193

2001 year-end chart performance for Free Fall by Jesse Cook
Chart (2001)	Peak position
Canadian Albums (Nielsen SoundScan)	155
