= Nomad (Jesse Cook album) =

Studio album by Jesse Cook
- Released: September 2, 2003
- Studio: 20 Hz Sound Studios, Coach House Music, Groovy Drums Studios, Toronto, Ontario; Leila Studios, Cairo, Egypt; Shydog Studio, Austin, Texas; Sonic Innovation Studio 2, London, England
- Genre: New-age
- Length: 46:02
- Label: Narada
- Producer: Jesse Cook

Jesse Cook chronology
Free Fall (2000)	Nomad (2003)	Montréal (2004)

Nomad is the fifth studio album by guitarist Jesse Cook. The album has guest appearances by Flora Purim and Kurt Neumann and Sam Llanas of the BoDeans.

== Track listing ==
All songs written by Jesse Cook except where noted.

1. "Prelude" – 1:45
2. "Qadduka-i-Mayyas" (traditional, arr. Jesse Cook) – 3:21
3. "Surrender" – 3:58
4. "Early on Tuesday" – 3:51
5. "Beloved" – 2:07
6. "Waiting for Tide" – 5:41
7. "Down Like Rain" – 3:37
8. "Leila" – 3:44
9. "Maybe" – 3:16
10. "Nomad" (Jesse Cook, Simon Emmerson, James McNally) – 5:32
11. "Worlds Away" – 4:39
12. "Toca Orilla" (Jesse Cook/Alejandra Nuñez) – 4:21
