= D'Gary =

Malagasy musician

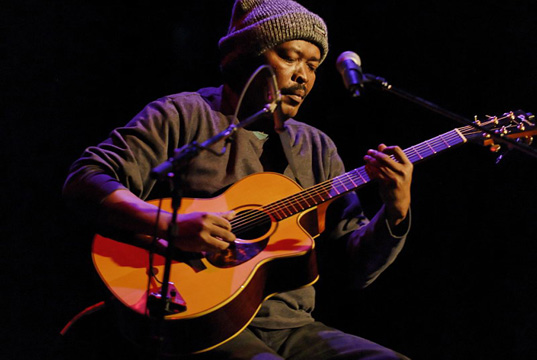
- D'Gary in 2007

Background information
- Born: Ernest Randrianasolo; 22 October 1961; Antananarivo, Madagascar
- Occupations: Musician guitarist singer-songwriter
- Instruments: Guitar vocals
- Years active: 1978–present

Ernest Randrianasolo (born 22 October 1961), better known as D'Gary, is a Malagasy musician of Bara ethnicity. His primary instrument is the acoustic guitar.

== Musical style ==
D'Gary's elaborate playing style is characterised by his use of alternative tunings. His style developed from his interest in Malagasy music, such as tsapiky, popular in southern Madagascar, and has been compared to music produced on traditional instruments, like the Vezo's marovany frame box zither and the Bara's lokanga violin.

In 2007, he toured North America with the International Guitar Night ensemble and recorded the International Guitar Night II live album with the collaboration of Brian Gore (US), Miguel de la Bastide (Trinidad) and Clive Carroll (UK) under the Pacific Music label.

In April 2009, he toured the United States as part of the Throw Down Your Heart tour with Bela Fleck and other African musicians.

== Selected discography ==
Studio albums

- Malagasy Guitar – D'Gary. Music From Madagascar – 10 February 1993 (Shanachie)
- The Long Way Home (with Dama) – 15 September 1994 (Shanachie)
- Horombe (with Jihe) – 21 May 1996 (Stern's)
- Mbo Loza – 24 June 1997 (Indigo)
- Akata Meso – 9 July 2002 (Indigo)
