= John Cook (filmmaker) =

Austrian film director

John Cook (1935 - 21 September 2001) was an Austrian filmmaker. Born in Toronto, Ontario, Canada, Cook lived and worked most of his life in Europe and often referred to himself as "Viennese by choice", having moved to Austria in the late 1960s after a career in commercial photography in Paris. Little-known in his native Canada, Cook is considered, despite his small filmography, an important figure in Austrian cinema.

Cook was the father of Canadian guitarist Jesse Cook.

== Filmography ==
- Artischocke (1982)
- Schwitzkasten (Clinch) (1978)
- Langsamer Sommer (Slow Summer) (1976)
- Ich schaff's einfach nimmer (I Just Can't Go On) (1973)
