= Vertigo (Jesse Cook album) =

Studio album by Jesse Cook
- Released: June 16, 1998
- Genre: New flamenco, world fusion, ethno-jazz
- Length: 50:01
- Label: Narada
- Producer: Jesse Cook

Jesse Cook chronology
| Gravity (1996) | Vertigo (1998) | Free Fall (2000) |

Vertigo is the third studio album by the new flamenco guitarist Jesse Cook. Musicians vary by track, including Jesse Cook, Stanley Dural Jr. (a.k.a. Buckwheat Zydeco), Art Avalos, Ofra Harnoy, Blake Manning, Carmen Romero, Miguel de la Bastide, Djivan Gasparyan, George Koller, Mario Melo, Etric Lyons, and Holly Cole. The final track, "Fragile", includes a second song.

The album was rated 4 out of 5 stars by AllMusic.

== Track listing ==
1. "That's Right!" – 3:42
2. "Byzantium Underground" – 3:59
3. "Canción Triste" – 5:00
4. "Rattle and Burn" – 3:46
5. "Red" – 4:49
6. "Breathing Below Surface" – 6:38
7. "Avocado" – 3:02
8. "Allegretto" – 3:22
9. "Vertigo" – 4:10
10. "Fragile" (Holly Cole) - 3:56/ – 11:03

(Contains the hidden track "Wednesday Night At Etric's")

All songs written by Jesse Cook, except "Fragile" written by Sting.
