= Gravity (Jesse Cook album) =

Studio album by Jesse Cook
- Released: September 24, 1996
- Recorded: Coach House Music, Canada
- Genre: New Flamenco, ethno-jazz
- Length: 46:10
- Label: Narada
- Producer: Jesse Cook

Jesse Cook chronology
Tempest (1995)	Gravity (1996)	Vertigo (1998)

Professional ratings
Review scores
Source	Rating
Allmusic	link

Gravity is the second studio album by the New Flamenco artist Jesse Cook.

== Track listing ==
1. "Mario Takes a Walk" (Cook) – 3:47
2. "Azul" (Cook) – 4:16
3. "Gravity" (Cook) – 3:57
4. "Closer to Madness" (Cook) – 5:49
5. "Into the Dark" (Cook) – 4:15
6. "Brio" (Cook) – 3:15
7. "Falling From Grace" (Cook) – 3:33
8. "Olodum" (Cook) – 3:32
9. "Rapture" (Cook) – 4:20
10. "Gipsy" (Cook) – 2:29
11. "Luna Llena" (Cook) – 5:21 (Includes hidden track "Hidden Gravity" at 6:00)

== Credits ==
- Jesse Cook – Guitars, keyboards, percussions
- Tony Levin – Bass guitar
- Blake Manning – Drums
- Mario Melo – Percussion
- Andrés Morales – Bass guitar
