= 100 Años de Mariachi =

100 años de mariachi

Studio album by Plácido Domingo
- Released: October 5, 1999
- Genre: Ranchera
- Label: EMI
- Producer: Bebu Silvetti

Plácido Domingo chronology
Star Crossed Lovers (1999)	100 años de mariachi (1999)	Wagner Love Duets (2000)

100 años de mariachi is the title of a studio album released by Spanish performer Plácido Domingo. It was released on October 5, 1999, by EMI Latin. Domingo was awarded the Best Mexican-American/Tejano Music Performance at the 42nd Grammy Awards. By 2002, the album had sold over 2.5 million copies.

== Track listing ==
No.	Title	Length
1.	"Paloma querida"	3:31
2.	"La malagueña"	3:50
3.	"Pa todo el año"	4:00
4.	"De qué manera te olvido"	3:14
5.	"Cómo olvidar"	4:00
6.	"Tequila con limón"	3:37
7.	"La rondalla"	3:25
8.	"Ella"	3:22
9.	"Más fuerte que yo"	4:20
10.	"Ay, Jalisco no te rajes!"	3:20
11.	"El jinete"	3:14
12.	"Si nos dejan"	3:32
13.	"Cuando sale la Luna"	2:56
14.	"Yo soy mexicano"	3:47
15.	"Amanecí en tus brazos"	4:14
16.	"La feria de las flores"	2:56

== Chart performance ==
Chart (1999)	Peak position
US Billboard Top Latin Albums	37
US Billboard Regional Mexican Albums	6

== Sales and certifications ==
Region	Certification	Certified units/sales
Mexico (AMPROFON)	Gold	75,000^{^}
Spain (PROMUSICAE)	Platinum	100,000^{^}
United States (RIAA)	Platinum (Latin)	100,000^{^}
^{^} Shipments figures based on certification alone.
