= The Five-Year Engagement =

2012 film by Nicholas Stoller

The 5-Year Engagement
- Theatrical release poster
- Directed by: Nicholas Stoller
- Written by: Jason Segel; Nicholas Stoller
- Produced by: Judd Apatow; Nicholas Stoller; Rodney Rothman
- Starring: Jason Segel; Emily Blunt; Rhys Ifans; Chris Pratt; Alison Brie
- Cinematography: Javier Aguirresarobe
- Edited by: William Kerr; Peck Prior
- Music by: Michael Andrews
- Production companies: Apatow Productions; Relativity Media
- Distributed by: Universal Pictures
- Release date: April 27, 2012
- Running time: 124 minutes
- Country: United States
- Language: English
- Budget: $30 million
- Box office: $54.2 million

The Five-Year Engagement is a 2012 American romantic comedy film written, directed, and produced by Nicholas Stoller. Produced with Judd Apatow and Rodney Rothman, it is co-written by Jason Segel, who also stars in the film with Emily Blunt.

The American-British couple Tom and Violet's relationship becomes strained when their engagement is continually extended.

The film was released in North America on April 27, 2012. Critical reviews were mostly favorable, while earning $54.2 million in worldwide box office against a $30 million budget.

== Plot ==
In San Francisco, sous-chef Tom, and PhD graduate Violet, are happily engaged. Their wedding plans are interrupted when Tom's best friend Alex gets Violet's sister Suzie pregnant at Tom and Violet's engagement party, and Alex and Suzie quickly marry. Violet is accepted into the University of Michigan's two-year post-doctorate psychology program, Tom agrees to move with her and delay their wedding. Later, he is disheartened to learn his boss planned to make him head chef.

Unable to find a suitable chef's position in Michigan, Tom is resigned to working at Zingerman's deli and takes up hunting with Bill, a fellow university faculty spouse. Violet settles into her new job under professor Winton Childs, working with Doug, Ming, and Vaneetha.

A prank results in Violet being chosen to lead the team's research project, studying people who choose to eat stale donuts rather than wait for fresh ones to arrive. Tom and Violet's nuptials are further delayed when Winton receives funding from the National Institutes of Health with Violet's help and extends her program. Tom is upset by the news, and he and Violet fight over his unhappiness with their new life.

As years pass, Tom becomes disillusioned and obsessed with hunting. Alex, Suzie, and their daughter Vanessa visit, and reveal Suzie is pregnant again. Tom responds that he no longer wants to have a child, surprising Violet, who offers to look after Vanessa with him, but the night turns into a disaster after Vanessa shoots Violet with Tom's crossbow.

Tom's downward spiral becomes evident when Violet sees him eat a stale donut. At a bar with colleagues, a drunken Violet and Winton kiss, which she instantly regrets. She tells Tom that she wants to plan their wedding immediately, and he happily agrees. When Violet confesses to kissing Winton, Tom loses faith in their relationship, which reaches a climax when Winton comes to their rehearsal dinner to apologize.

Tom chases Winton away, then leaves to get drunk alone. He runs into Margaret, an amorous co-worker, but opts not to have sex with her, and wakes up half-naked in the snow with a frostbitten toe, which must be amputated. Violet visits Tom at the hospital, and they call off their engagement once they arrive home.

Violet starts a relationship with Winton but often reminisces about Tom. He wishes her a happy birthday via email, including a video of Ming's ridiculous experiment on his friend Tarquin. Violet calls Tom, who has returned to San Francisco, working as a sous-chef under Alex and dating the hostess, Audrey. Their friendly-but-awkward conversation takes a turn as they argue over Violet's stale donuts experiment as a metaphor for their relationship, and both end the call upset.

Realizing Tom's unhappiness, Alex fires him out of love, telling him that he is the better chef and should open his own establishment. So, Tom launches a popular taco truck.

Violet receives an assistant professorship but learns she was hired because she is dating Winton, so breaks up with him. After lunch with his parents, Tom decides to win Violet back and breaks up with Audrey. He surprises Violet at her grandmother's funeral in England, and they agree to spend the remainder of the summer together in San Francisco, rekindling their relationship while sharing an apartment and working in the taco truck.

Driving Violet to the airport, Tom offers to take his truck to Michigan and continue their relationship. Violet proposes to Tom on the side of the road, just as he did five years before, and Tom produces the ring he originally gave her, explaining that he was planning to re-propose at the airport.

They head to Alamo Square, where Violet has organized their family and friends for an impromptu wedding. Tom chooses between Violet's various options for the officiant, clothing, and music, and they finally marry. He and Violet share their first kiss as a married couple, and the film flashes back to their first kiss when they first met at a New Year's Eve party. Alex and Suzie sing "Cucurrucucú paloma" on a carriage ride with the newlyweds.

== Cast ==
- Jason Segel as Tom Solomon
- Emily Blunt as Violet Barnes
- Rhys Ifans as Winton Childs
- Chris Pratt as Alex Eilhauer
- Alison Brie as Suzie Barnes-Eilhauer
- Jacki Weaver as Sylvia Dickerson-Barnes
- Jim Piddock as George Barnes
- David Paymer as Pete Solomon
- Mimi Kennedy as Carol Solomon
- Mindy Kaling as Vaneetha
- Kevin Hart as Doug
- Brian Posehn as Tarquin
- Chris Parnell as Bill
- Lauren Weedman as Chef Sally
- Tracee Chimo as Margaret
- Zoe Niemkiewicz as Vanessa

In addition, Randall Park portrays Ming, while Dakota Johnson appears as Audrey.

== Production ==
Parts of the movie take place in Ann Arbor, Michigan, and scenes were filmed there and in nearby Ypsilanti in June 2011.

== Music ==
The Five Year Engagement: Music From The Motion Picture

Soundtrack album by Various Artists
- Released: April 17, 2012
- Recorded: Various
- Genre: Film soundtrack
- Length: 19:17
- Label: Backlot Music

The Five Year Engagement: Music From The Motion Picture is the soundtrack of the film. It was released on April 17, 2012, with Michael Andrews as composer and Jonathan Karp as Music Supervisor.

No.	Title	Performer(s)	Length
1.	"Jackie Wilson Said (I'm in Heaven When You Smile)"	Dexy's Midnight Runners
2.	"Jing Jing Jing (Jingle Bells)"	United States Airforce Band
3.	"Valerie"	Mark Ronson ft. Amy Winehouse
4.	"Sweet Thing"	Van Morrison
5.	"We Didn't Start The Fire"	Chris Pratt
6.	"Simon Was"	Petrojvic Blasting Company
7.	"The Courage To Carry On"	Aiden
8.	"Call Me Up in Dreamland"	Van Morrison
9.	"Cucurrucucú Paloma"	Chris Pratt
10.	"Say You Know"	Written by Hart/Dudas
11.	"Bright Side of the Road"	Van Morrison
12.	"Baby You're On Your Own"	The Steepwater Band
13.	"Jonah"	Guster
14.	"Sheri"	Stanley Turrentine
15.	"Wandering"	The Greyboy Allstars
16.	"White Night"	The Postelles
17.	"End of a Spark"	Tokyo Police Club
18.	"When That Evening Sun Goes Down"	Van Morrison
19.	"The Chicken Dance"	Written by Werner Thomas and Terry Rendall
20.	"Into The Mystic"	The Swell Season
21.	"Don't Worry Baby"	Los Lobos
22.	"Crazy Love"	Audra Mae
23.	"Give Me A Kiss (Just One Sweet Kiss)"	Van Morrison
24.	"Cucurrucucú Paloma"	Chris Pratt and Alison Brie
25.	"Two Wrongz"	Written by Da Diggler and I Ronic

== Release ==
The Five-Year Engagement was released on April 27, 2012 in the United States and Canada, reaching other major markets between May and July of 2012.

== Reception ==
=== Box office ===
In the United States and Canada, The Five-Year Engagement grossed $28.8 million, with $25.3 million in other territories, for a worldwide total of $54.2 million, against a budget of $30 million. It opened at No. 5, its first of three consecutive weekends in the Top 10 at the domestic box office.

=== Critical response ===
On the review aggregator website Rotten Tomatoes, 64% of 177 critics' reviews are positive, with an average rating of 6.2/10. The website's consensus reads: "While certainly overlong, The Five-Year Engagement benefits from the easy chemistry of its leads and a funny, romantic script with surprising depth and intelligence." Metacritic, which uses a weighted average, assigned the film a score of 62 out of 100, based on 38 critics, indicating "generally favorable" reviews. Audiences polled by CinemaScore gave the film an average grade of "B−" on an A+ to F scale.

Owen Gleiberman Entertainment Weekly gave the film a grade of a B+ and called it "A lively, original, and scattershot-hilarious ramble of a Judd Apatow production." Elizabeth Weitzman, from New York Daily News wrote: "Blunt has never been more relaxed, and she and Segel have a believably warm chemistry." Richard Roeper gave the film a grade of a B+, saying that it featured a "winning cast in an uneven but often brilliant and weird comedy."
