= David Záizar =

- Born: David Záizar Torres c. 1930; Tamazula, Jalisco, Mexico
- Origin: Tamazula, Jalisco, Mexico
- Died: 2 January 1982 (aged 53) Mexico City, Mexico
- Genre: Mariachi
- Occupations: Singer-songwriter, actor
- Label: Peerless Records

David Záizar (c. 1930 - 2 January 1982) was a Mexican mariachi singer and actor who appeared in many Mexican films. He was active from the 1940s until his death. Záizar was a highly respected figure in ranchera music, and has been dubbed "El Rey del Falsete" ("The King of the Falsetto").

== Career ==
Initially, he joined forces with his brother, Juan Záizar, with whom he formed a duo. Prior to this, they had both been working on individual projects, especially Juan, who was a renowned composer and singer. They had only sung together for very special occasions, like their tribute to honor the famous ranchera composer, also from Jalisco, Pepe Guízar. Out of this union came the famous duo, "Los Hermanos Záizar" (the Záizar brothers). The brothers mainly recorded on Peerless Records, but they also made some recordings on RCA Victor and RCA Camden in their early years. Nearly all of his solo recordings recorded on Peerless. Like most Mexican folk songs, the majority of those interpreted by David that we have left today are about lost loves, unfaithful women, Mexico and its people, and several other topics commonly present throughout ranchera music.

== Death ==
On 2 January 1982, Záizar died in Mexico City at the age of 53, due to non-traumatic cardiac arrest. His body was buried in a crypt within the plot of the National Association of Actors (ANDA) of the Panteón Jardín, located in the same city.

== Legacy ==
Záizar’s songs are considered an integral part of the Mexican musical heritage and are comparable, for instance, to Woody Guthrie's influence on American folk music.

In addition to his own recordings, many of his songs have been recorded successfully by renowned recording artists from around the Spanish-speaking world, most notably Miguel Aceves Mejía, Pedro Infante, Rocío Dúrcal, Javier Solís, Pedro Fernández, Jorge Negrete, José Alfredo Jiménez, Vikki Carr, Luis Miguel, Lola Beltrán, Alejandro Fernández, Chavela Vargas, Maná, Antonio Aguilar, Vicente Fernández, Julio Iglesias, Joaquín Sabina, Manolo García, Los Tigres del Norte, and Gualberto Castro.

In Tamazula, Záizar’s house was adorned with an allusive plaque and "Reforma" street changed its name to "Hermanos Záizar." In the same city, on 24 September 2009, the General Directorate of Cultural Linkage of the Ministry of Culture of Jalisco inaugurated the Hermanos Záizar Museum, which houses a section dedicated to the history of the town, with paleontology and archaeology rooms, a section for children and another for ethnographic studies. On the upper level of the museum, charro costumes used by the brothers, their discography, photos and a small music library are exhibited.

A monument has been erected in his honor in the Parque de las Rosas, now renamed "David Záizar" in the Colonia Militar Marte, Iztacalco, Mexico City.

== Partial list of songs ==
1. Indita Mía
2. El Preso De San Juan De Ulúa
3. El Abandonado
4. Flor Silvestre
5. La Malagueña
6. Cielo Rojo
7. Cuatro Vidas
8. Esta Tristeza Mía
9. Sueño
10. Dolor De Mi Dolor
11. Se Me Hizo Fácil
12. Hace Un Año
13. Albur De Amor
14. Llorona
15. Hay Unos Ojos
16. Amor De Los Dos
17. El Profugo
18. Anillo De Compromiso
19. Estrellita Marinera
20. Rayando El Sol
21. Un Viejo Amor
22. Suenen Guitarras
23. Por Una Mujer Casada
24. Mi Terruño
25. Las Rejas No Matan
26. La Barca De Oro
27. Paloma Negra
28. Me Voy Lejos
29. El Jinete
30. El Adiós Del Soldado
31. Escaleras De La Cárcel

== Filmography ==
Záizar appeared in the following films:

- No soy monedita de oro (1959)
- El rayo de Jalisco (1962)
- La máscara roja (1962)
- Juramento de sangre (1962)
- Matar o morir (1963)
- Sangre en la barranca (1963)
- Cruz de Olvido (1984, released posthumously)
