= Cucurrucucú paloma =

1954 song by Tomás Méndez

"Cucurrucucú paloma" (Spanish for 'Coo-coo dove') is a Mexican huapango-style song written by Tomás Méndez in 1954. The title is an onomatopeic reference to the characteristic call of the mourning dove, which is evoked in the refrain. The lyrics allude to love sickness.

Over the years, the song has been used in the soundtrack of several films and has gained international popularity. It initially appeared in the classic Mexican comedy Escuela de vagabundos screened in 1955, where it was sung by the star of the film, Pedro Infante. The song also gave its name to the 1965 Mexican film Cucurrucucú Paloma, directed by Miguel Delgado, in which it was performed by Lola Beltrán, who starred as "Paloma Méndez".

In Pedro Almodovar's film Talk to Her (2002), the piece is rendered by the Brazilian singer Caetano Veloso in an art-song style quite different from the mariachi folk-kitsch of its original cinema presentation.

Other films in which the song is used include The Last Sunset (1961), Le Magnifique (1973), Happy Together (1997), My Son, My Son, What Have Ye Done (2009), The Five-Year Engagement (2012), and Moonlight (2016).

Since its first release on record in 1956 in a version sung by Harry Belafonte, the song has been recorded by various other popular singers, including Luis Miguel, Rocío Dúrcal, Perry Como, Miguel Aceves Mejía, Nancy Ames, Hibari Misora, Dario Moreno, Gaby Moreno, Nana Mouskouri, Julio Iglesias, Shirley Kwan, Lila Downs, Joan Baez (on her album Gracias a la Vida), Rosemary Clooney, Natalia Lafourcade, and The Del Rubio Triplets; the refrain was also taken up by Franco Battiato in his own song "Cuccurucucù" (on La voce del padrone).

In 2019, operatic tenor Juan Diego Florez sang the song, accompanying himself on guitar at La Scala in Milan, Italy, in a version appearing in a YouTube video that has been viewed 17 million times.
