= Frontiers (Jesse Cook album) =

Studio album by Jesse Cook
- Released: April 3, 2007
- Genre: New Flamenco/Jazz
- Label: Koch Records

Jesse Cook chronology
Montréal (2004)	Frontiers (2007)	The Rumba Foundation (2009)

Frontiers is the sixth studio album by Jesse Cook. . Cook and nine other musicians recorded the album at Coach House Music in Canada. The album was mixed by Cook. All songs were written by Jesse Cook except "It Ain't Me Babe", which is a cover version of the original song by Bob Dylan, and La Llorona, a traditional Mexican folk song.

== Track listing ==
1. Matisse the Cat
2. Cafe Mocha
3. Rain
4. Vamos
5. Turning
6. Havana
7. El Cri
8. Come What May
9. It Ain't Me Babe
10. La Llorona
11. Waiting
12. Europa
13. Alone

== Personnel ==
Credits for the album, according to Cook's official web page:

- Chris Church, Violins.
- Art Avalos, Percussion on "Cafe Mocha"', "Rain", "Vamos", "Turning", "Havana", "Come What May", timbales on "Matisse the Cat".
- Chendy Leon, Percussion on "El Cri", "La Llorona", "Europa".
- Ross MacIntire, Acoustic Bass.
- Kevin Fox, Cello.
- Gary Craig, Drums on "It Ain't Me Babe".
- Melissa McClelland, Vocals on "It Ain't Me Babe".
- Amanda Martinez, Vocals on "La Llorona".
- Maryem Tollar, Vocals on "Europa".
- Jesse Cook, Guitars and all instruments not listed.

== Charts and certifications ==
Region	Certification
Canada (Music Canada)	Gold
