= Siento (Miguel de la Bastide album) =

Studio album by Miguel de la Bastide
- Released: 2003
- Genre: Flamenco
- Length: 39:26
- Label: La Bastide Productions

Miguel de la Bastide chronology
El Cambio (1998)	Siento (2003)

Siento is the second studio album by Miguel de la Bastide. It was recorded and mastered at La Bastide Productions in Toronto Canada in 2003.

All titles were composed and arranged by Miguel de la Bastide with the exception of track 7 "Amanecer", it was co-written, co-arranged and co-produced with Elliot Zeitoune at KTP Music Productions. As per the liner notes.

This album is also an Enhanced CD that was compatible with PC and Mac (OS9 only) computers at the time of production. The interactive CD-ROM has a main menu with the following tabs "About Siento", "Biography", "El Cambio", "Compilations", "Photo Album" and "Web Site". The tab "El Cambio" has four sample audio tracks from his first album El Cambio, along with the music video of the same name. The "Web Site" tab no longer points to his present web site. It also has CD-TEXT, where titles are seen on any compatible player.

In 2005, the titles Rocío de la Cubana, Tentación, Reflejo and Siento were selected by Somerset Entertainment and was placed on the compilation "Mistica – The Passion of the Spanish Guitar".

== Track listing ==
1. "Tentación" – 7:26
2. "Alma de Pardo" – 4:00
3. "Andaluza” – 4:15
4. "Reflejo" – 5:31
5. "Rocío de la Cubana" – 4:03
6. "Siento" – 4:48
7. "Amanecer" – 3:53
8. "El Santo Día" – 5:20

== Musicians ==
- Miguel de la Bastide – All flamenco guitar, octave mandolin (4), udu drum (2, 3 and 4), darbuka (2), shaker (2 and 4), nudillos (1) and all palmas (music)
- Mario Melo – cajon (2, 4 and 6), udu drum (1, 5 and 6), congas (4), djembe (6), shaker (6) and palmas (1,5 and 6)
- Roberto Benson – bass (2 and 4)
- David Slater – soprano (2) and tenor sax (4)
- Elliot Zeitoune – keyboards (7), synthesizers (7) and programming (7)
- Carmen Romero – footwork (3), palmas (3), jaleo (1, 3, 4 and 5)
- La Pamela – jaleo (1, 3, 4 and 5)
- Gina Tantalo – jaleo (1, 3, 4 and 5)
