= Tomás Méndez =

Mexican ranchera singer (1927–1995)

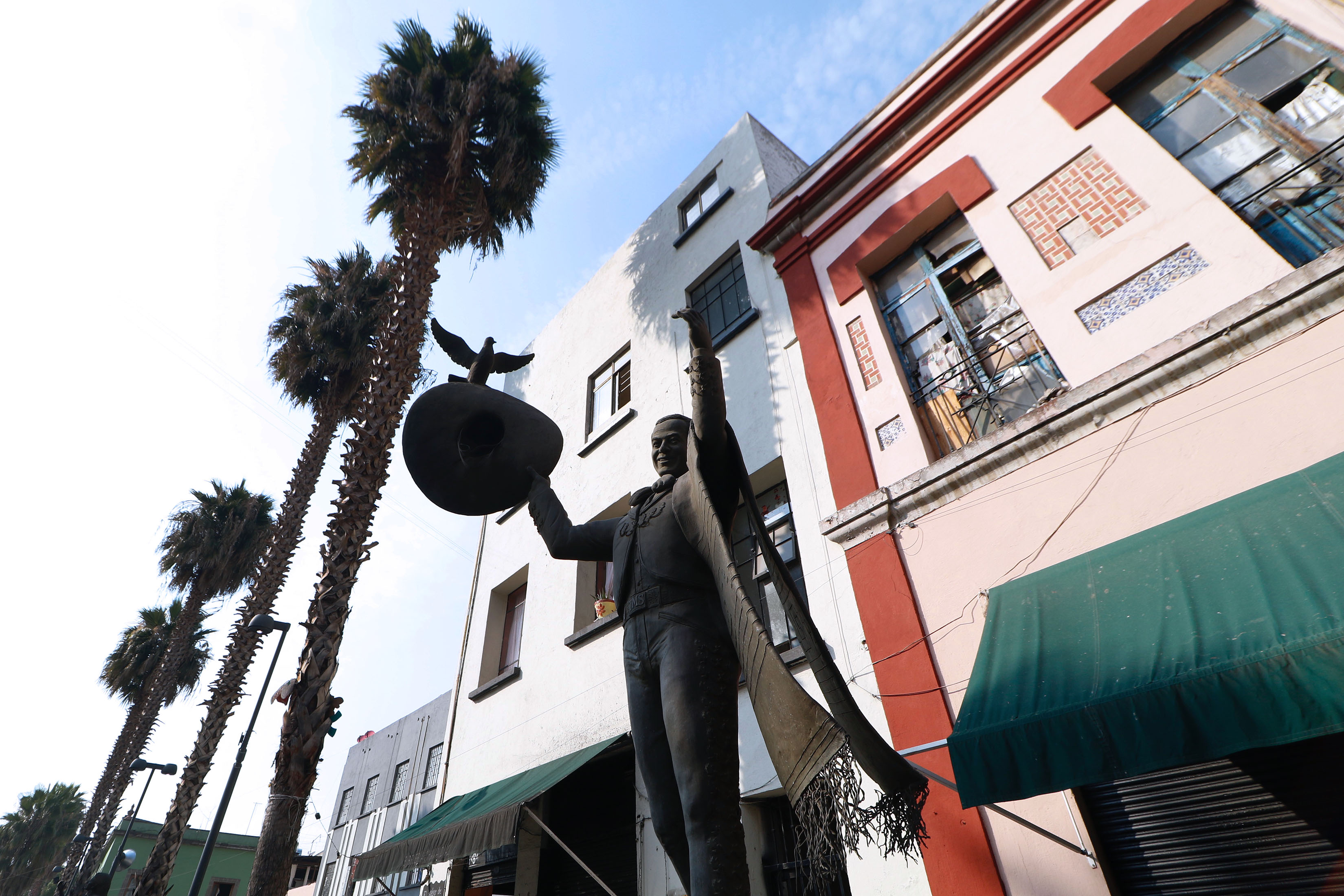
- Tomás Méndez monument in Mexico City.

Background information
- Born: Tomás Méndez Sosa; July 25, 1927; Fresnillo, Zacatecas, Mexico
- Died: July 19, 1995 (aged 67) Mexico City, Mexico
- Genres: Mexican music and ranchera music
- Occupations: musician, composer, singer

Tomás Méndez (born Tomás Méndez Sosa; July 25, 1927 – June 19, 1995) was a Mexican composer and singer of ranchera music. He was born in Fresnillo, Zacatecas, Mexico. He became famous in the 1950s due to his partnership with singer Lola Beltrán. Their first song together was Gorrioncillo Pecho Amarillo in 1954, and they continued to create further hits such as Cucurrucucú paloma, Tres días, and Bala Perdida. He died in Mexico City on 19 June 1995.

The song Cucurrucucú paloma was played in many movies such as The Last Sunset, Happy Together, Talk to Her and The Five Year Engagement and has also been covered by notable singers such as Harry Belafonte, Perry Como, and Caetano Veloso.

== Biography ==
Tomás Méndez Sosa was born on July 25, 1926, in Fresnillo, Zacatecas. He was the son of Juan Méndez, a miner, and María Sosa de la Rosa. During his early childhood years, he worked in the local mining industry in Zacatecas. At the age of 11, Tomás delivered food in the mines.

Later, Sosa moved to Mexico City, where he began working at a radio station and started building his career as a songwriter. He collaborated with performers from the Golden Age of Mexican Cinema.

== Songs ==
- Pobre Leña de Pirul
- Gorrioncillo pecho amarillo
- Cucurrucucú paloma
- Golondrina presumida
- Huapango torero
- Las rejas no matan
- Que me toquen las golondrinas
- Paloma negra
- Puñalada trapera
- Tres Fritos burritos
- La Muerte de Un Gallero
- La Melina Que Se Fue
