= Ángela Aguilar =

American singer (born 2003)

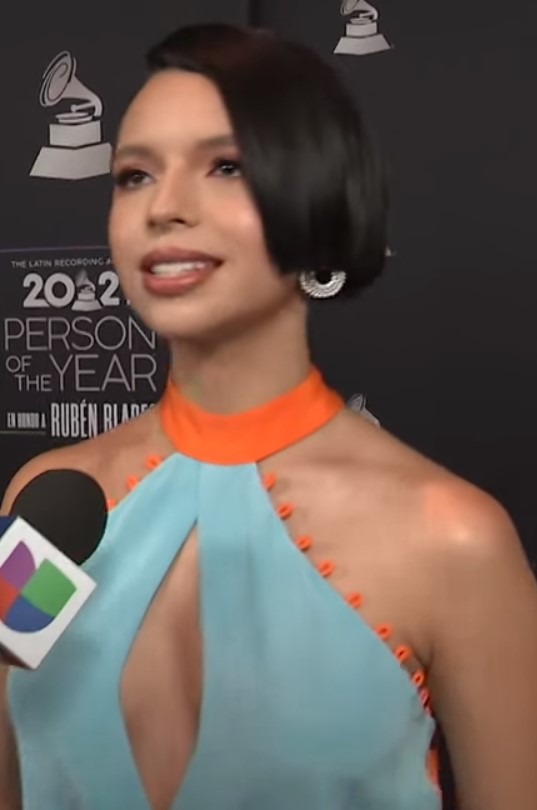
- Aguilar in 2021
- Born: Ángela Aguilar Álvarez; October 8, 2003 (age 22); Los Angeles, California, U.S.
- Citizenship: Mexico; United States
- Occupation: Singer
- Years active: 2012–present
- Spouse: Christian Nodal (m. 2024)
- Father: Pepe Aguilar
- Family: Leonardo Aguilar (brother); Antonio Aguilar (grandfather); Flor Silvestre (grandmother); Majo Aguilar (cousin)
- Musical career
- Genres: Regional Mexican; Latin pop
- Instrument: Vocals
- Years active: 2012–present
- Labels: Machin; Equinoccio Records S.a de C.V.
- Website: angelaaguilaroficial.com

Ángela Aguilar Álvarez (born October 8, 2003) is a Mexican-American singer. She was born in Los Angeles while her mother was accompanying her father, Pepe Aguilar, on tour. Aguilar gained notable recognition after performing "La Llorona" at the 19th Annual Latin Grammy Awards in 2018. Her paternal grandparents are the actors and singers from the Golden Age of Mexican cinema, Antonio Aguilar and Flor Silvestre.

Her debut solo studio album, Primero Soy Mexicana (2018), was met with critical acclaim and success. She has been nominated for a Grammy Award and two Latin Grammy Awards, becoming one of the youngest artists nominated for both accolades.

== Early life ==
Ángela Aguilar Álvarez was born to Pepe Aguilar and Aneliz Álvarez Alcalá in Los Angeles, California on October 8, 2003, while her father was on tour. She was named after her great-grandmother Ángela Márquez Barraza Valle, her father's paternal grandmother. She has Argentinian heritage on her mother’s side with her maternal grandmother being born and raised in Buenos Aires, Argentina. Aguilar has dual citizenship with Mexico and the United States. She was born into a musical family, known as "La Dinastía Aguilar" (The Aguilar Dynasty). Since a young age, Aguilar has frequently accompanied her father on tour throughout Latin America alongside her brother, Leonardo Aguilar.

In July 2018, Aguilar partnered with Voto Latino to encourage more Latino Americans to vote in American elections.

== Career ==
=== 2012-2017: Career beginnings ===
In 2012, at nine years old, Aguilar released Nueva Tradición, alongside her brother, Leonardo. It featured four songs by Leonardo and four by Ángela. In 2016, Aguilar participated in the BBC 100 Woman festival in Mexico City. At 13 years old, she was the youngest performer of the festival. She told BBC News that the music industry was dominated by men and hoped it would change.

In January 2018, Aguilar and her family launched an equestrian-musical style tour called "Jaripeo Sin Fronteras". Aguilar accompanied her father, Pepe, her uncle Antonio, and her brother, Leonardo.

=== 2018-present: Primero Soy Mexicana and Mexicana Enamorada ===
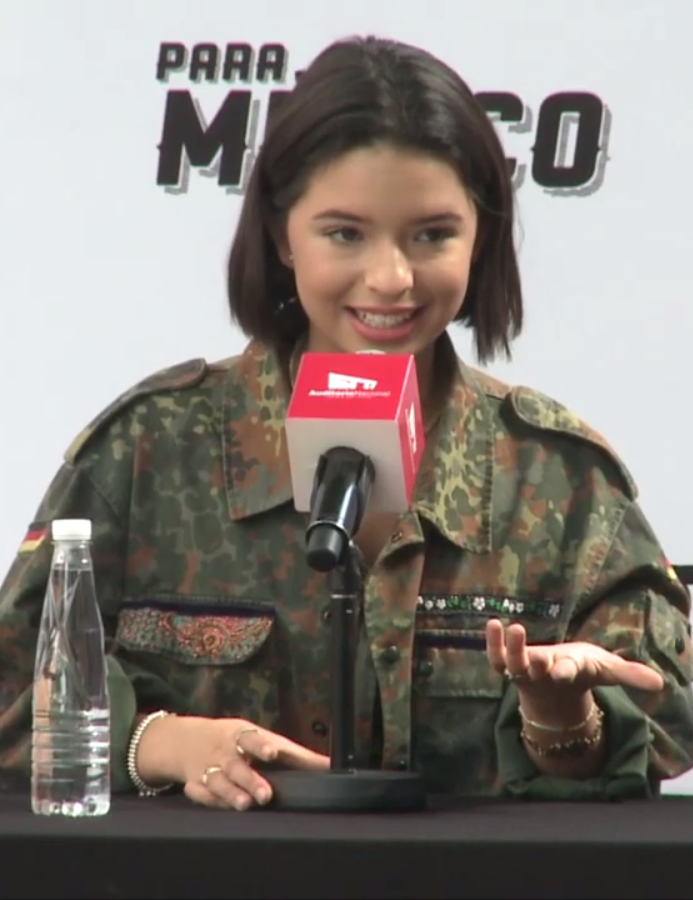
Aguilar in 2018

On March 2, 2018, Aguilar released her first solo album, Primero Soy Mexicana, produced by her father, Pepe. The album featured eleven well-known ranchera songs previously performed by other prominent music artists, such as Lucha Villa, Rocío Dúrcal, and her grandmother, Flor Silvestre. Aguilar performed the album's first single, "Tu Sangre en Mi Cuerpo" at the 2018 Premios Tu Mundo. On September 20, Aguilar was nominated for Best New Artist, and her album, Primero Soy Mexicana was nominated for Best Ranchero/Mariachi Album at the 19th Annual Latin Grammy Awards. At the ceremony, she performed "La Llorona", where she received a standing ovation from the audience. Aguilar received widespread praise from various artists, including Mexican ranchera singer Vicente Fernández for her performance. On December 7, Aguilar's album Primero Soy Mexicana, was nominated for a Grammy Award for Best Regional Mexican Music Album.

On April 3, 2019, Aguilar was named the Artistic and Cultural Ambassador of Zacatecas, Mexico by Mayor Ulises Mejía Haro. On May 21, Aguilar was nominated for three awards at the 2019 Premios Juventud. She performed a medley of songs alongside mariachi singers Christian Nodal and Pipe Bueno. On July 23, Aguilar released an exclusive cover performance of "Shallow" on the Recording Academy's YouTube page, with permission from its songwriter, Lady Gaga. It was the first time that Aguilar recorded music in English.

On January 31, 2020, Aguilar released a tribute EP to American singer, Selena, titled Baila Esta Cumbia. On September 24, 2021, she released her second solo album, Mexicana Enamorada. On April 1, she released "En Realidad", the first single from her third solo studio album.

== Personal life ==
Aguilar was born into a musical family, known as "La Dinastía Aguilar". Aguilar's father is Mexican singer Pepe Aguilar, her paternal grandparents are Mexican singer-actors Antonio Aguilar and Flor Silvestre, her uncle is Antonio Aguilar Jr., and her brother is Leonardo Aguilar. On June 10, 2024, Aguilar confirmed her relationship with the Mexican singer Christian Nodal. On July 24, 2024, they were married in a private ceremony in the Hacienda San Gabriel de las Palmas, located in the state of Morelos, near Lake Tequesquitengo.

== Discography ==
=== Solo studio albums ===
- Navidad con Ángela Aguilar (2013)
- Primero Soy Mexicana (2018)
- Mexicana Enamorada (2021)
- Bolero (2024)
- Nadie Se Va Como Llegó (2025)

=== EPs ===
- Baila Esta Cumbia (2020)
- Que No Se Apague la Música (2020)

=== Collaborative studio albums ===
- Nueva Tradición (2012)

=== Guest works ===
- Nueva Tradición (with Leonardo Aguilar) (2012)
- MTV Unplugged (Pepe Aguilar) (2014)

== Awards and nominations ==
Name of the award ceremony, year presented, nominee(s) of the award, award category, and the result of the nomination
| Award ceremony | Year | Category | Nominee(s)/work(s) | Result | Ref. |
|---|---|---|---|---|---|
| Billboard Women in Music | 2025 | Breakthrough Award | Herself | Won | |
| Grammy Awards | 2019 | Best Regional Mexican Music Album | Primero Soy Mexicana | Nominated | |
| iHeartRadio Music Awards | 2022 | Regional Mexican Song of the Year | "Dime Cómo Quieres" | Nominated | |
| Premios Juventud | 2019 | Best Regional Mexican Artist | Herself | Nominated | |
| Premios Juventud | 2019 | Best Social Artist | Herself | Nominated | |
| Premios Juventud | 2019 | Best New Influencer | Herself | Nominated | |
| Premios Juventud | 2021 | Viral Track of the Year | "Dime Cómo Quieres" | Nominated | |
| Premios Juventud | 2021 | Best Mariachi Song | "Dime Cómo Quieres" | Won | |
| Premios Juventud | 2022 | Female Artist of the Youth | Herself | Nominated | |
| Premios Juventud | 2022 | Female On The Rise Artist | Herself | Won | |
| Premios Juventud | 2022 | Regional Mexican Album of the Year | Mexicana Enamorada | Won | |
| Premios Juventud | 2022 | Best Regional Mexican Song | "Ahí Donde Me Ven" | Nominated | |
| Premios Juventud | 2022 | Best Regional Mexican Fusion | "Ella Qué Te Dio" | Nominated | |
| Premios Juventud | 2022 | Popular Artist or Influencer | Herself | Nominated | |
| Premios Juventud | 2022 | Best Fandom | Herself | Nominated | |
| Premios Juventud | 2023 | Artist of the Youth – Female | Herself | Nominated | |
| Premios Juventud | 2023 | Girl Power | "Que Agonía" | Nominated | |
| Premios Juventud | 2023 | Best Regional Mexican Collaboration | "Que Agonía" | Nominated | |
| Premios Juventud | 2023 | I Want More | Herself | Nominated | |
| Latin American Music Awards | 2021 | Favorite Virtual Concert | Mexicano Hasta Los Huesos | Nominated | |
| Latin American Music Awards | 2021 | Favorite Video | "Dime Cómo Quieres" | Nominated | |
| Latin American Music Awards | 2023 | Favorite Regional Mexican Artist | Herself | Nominated | |
| Latin American Music Awards | 2024 | Best Collaboration - Regional Mexican | "Que Agonía" | Nominated | |
| Latin Grammy Awards | 2018 | Best New Artist | Herself | Nominated | |
| Latin Grammy Awards | 2018 | Best Ranchero/Mariachi Album | Primero Soy Mexicana | Nominated | |
| Latin Grammy Awards | 2022 (Note: At the 23rd Annual Latin Grammy Awards, "Ahí Donde Me Ven" was also nominated for Best Regional Mexican Song, the nominee was its songwriter Gussy Lau.) | Best Ranchero/Mariachi Album | Mexicana Enamorada | Nominated | |
| Latin Grammy Awards | 2024 (Note: At the 25th Annual Latin Grammy Awards, "Por el Contrario" was also nominated for Best Regional Mexican Song. The nominees were its songwriters Édgar Barrera, Becky G, Kevyn Mauricio Cruz & Elena Rose.) | Album of the Year | Bolero | Nominated | |
| Lo Nuestro Awards | 2020 | Social Artist of the Year | Herself | Nominated | |
| Lo Nuestro Awards | 2022 | Artist of the Year | Herself | Nominated | |
| Lo Nuestro Awards | 2022 | Album of the Year | Mexicana Enamorada | Nominated | |
| Lo Nuestro Awards | 2022 | Song of the Year | "Dime Cómo Quieres" | Nominated | |
| Lo Nuestro Awards | 2022 | New Female Artist of the Year | Herself | Won | |
| Lo Nuestro Awards | 2023 | Artist of the Year | Herself | Nominated | |
| Lo Nuestro Awards | 2023 | Song of the Year | "Ahí Donde Me Ven" | Nominated | |
| Lo Nuestro Awards | 2023 | The Perfect Mix of the Year | "Ella Qué Te Dio" | Nominated | |
| Lo Nuestro Awards | 2023 | Regional Mexican Female Artist of the Year | Herself | Won | |
| Lo Nuestro Awards | 2023 | Regional Mexican Song of the Year | "Ahí Donde Me Ven" | Nominated | |
| Lo Nuestro Awards | 2023 | Mariachi/Ranchera Song of the Year | "Ahí Donde Me Ven" | Nominated | |
