= Dime Cómo Quieres =

2020 single by Christian Nodal

Single by Christian Nodal and Ángela Aguilar

from the album Ayayay! (Deluxe)
- Released: November 13, 2020
- Recorded: 2020
- Genre: Mariachi; rhythmic ballad
- Length: 2:51
- Label: Universal Latin; Fonovisa
- Songwriters: Christian Nodal; Édgar Barrera

Christian Nodal singles chronology
"Nace Un Borracho" (2020)	"Dime Cómo Quieres" (2020)	"Poco" (2020)

Ángela Aguilar singles chronology
"Bidi Bidi Bom Bom" (2019)	"Dime Cómo Quieres" (2020)	"Cuando Dos Almas" (2020)

Music video
- "Dime Cómo Quieres" on YouTube

"Dime Cómo Quieres" (English: "Tell Me How You Want (It)") is a song by regional Mexican artists Christian Nodal and Ángela Aguilar, released on November 13, 2020. Written by Nodal and Édgar Barrera, it reached number one on the Monitor Latino Top 20 General Mexican Songs chart and number eight on the Billboard Top Latin Songs chart in the United States.

== Background ==
Nodal said in an interview with Billboard magazine that he reached out to Aguilar in 2019 with song and she responded a few months later with her vocals on it. The song's release and music video were delayed due to the COVID-19 pandemic.

== Music video ==
The music video was shot three months before the songs release. Nodal and Aguilar are seen together in the video, although they recorded their parts separately using a green screen.

== Chart performance ==
In Mexico, "Dime Cómo Quieres" debuted at number nine on the Mexico Top 20 General chart, eventually rising to number one. In the United States, the single entered Billboard's Hot Latin Songs at number nine; the following week, it rose to its number eight peak. The song also peaked at number one on Billboard's Regional Mexican Songs. It entered the Billboard's Bubbling Under Hot 100 chart on the week ending December 5, 2020, debuting at number 22. It was Nodal's third appearance on the chart and Aguilar's first.

== Charts ==
=== Weekly charts ===
Chart (2020–2021)	Peak position
El Salvador (Monitor Latino)	3
Global 200 (Billboard)	89
Guatemala (Monitor Latino)	4
Mexico Top 20 General (Monitor Latino)	1
US Bubbling Under Hot 100 (Billboard)	22
US Hot Latin Songs (Billboard)	8
US Latin Airplay (Billboard)	5
US Regional Mexican Airplay (Billboard)	1
US (Monitor Latino)	1

=== Year-end charts ===
Chart (2021)	Position
US Hot Latin Songs (Billboard)	28

== Certifications ==
Region	Certification	Certified units/sales
Mexico (AMPROFON)	Diamond	700,000^{‡}
United States (RIAA)	7× Platinum (Latin)	420,000^{‡}
Streaming
Central America (CFC)	Platinum	7,000,000^{†}
^{‡} Sales+streaming figures based on certification alone.^{†} Streaming-only figures based on certification alone.
