= Jesse Cook =

Canadian guitarist

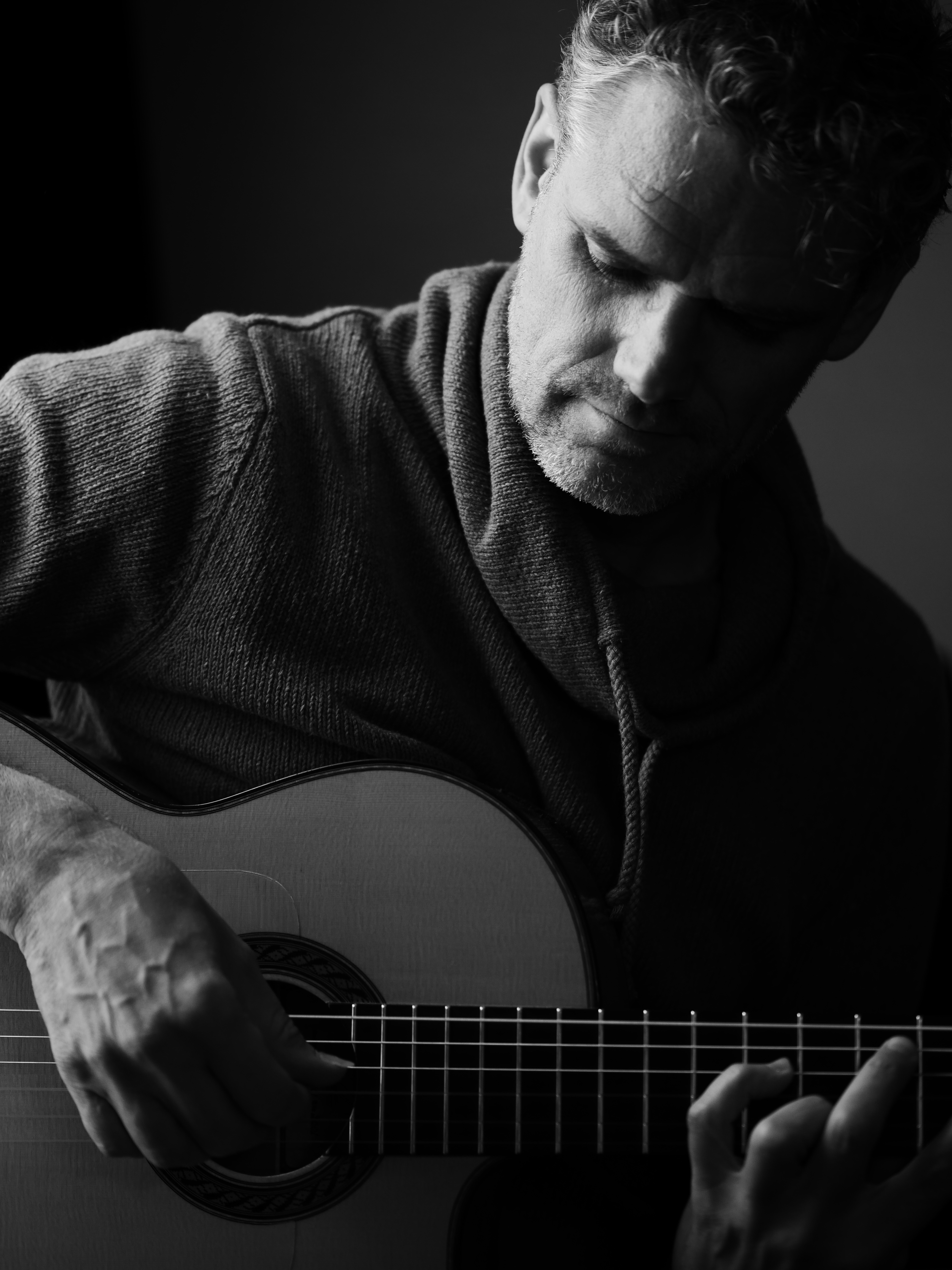

Background information
- Born: Jesse Arnaud Cook; 28 November 1964 (age 61); Paris, France
- Origin: Toronto, Ontario, Canada
- Genres: New flamenco, world music, ethno jazz
- Occupations: Musician, composer
- Instrument: Classical guitar
- Years active: 1995–present
- Labels: Narada, EMI, E1
- Website: www.jessecook.com

Jesse Arnaud Cook (born 28 November 1964) is a Canadian guitarist. He is a Juno Award winner, Acoustic Guitar Player's Choice Award silver winner in the Flamenco Category, and a three-time winner of the Canadian Smooth Jazz award for Guitarist of the Year. He has recorded on the EMI, E1 Music and Narada labels and has sold over 1.5 million records worldwide.

== Life and career ==
Cook was born 28 November 1964, in Paris, France, to Canadian photographer and filmmaker John Cook and Canadian television director and producer Heather Cook. He was raised in Toronto, Canada.

Cook studied classical and jazz guitar at Canada's Royal Conservatory of Music, York University, and Berklee College of Music in the United States. He has often quipped that he later attempted to unlearn it all while immersing himself in the oral traditions of Roma music.

After the independent 1995 release in Canada of his debut album, Tempest, he played at the 1995 Catalina Jazz Festival; shortly afterwards, Tempest entered the American Billboard charts at No. 14.

Cook has recorded ten studio albums, five live DVDs and has traveled the world exploring musical traditions that he has blended into his style of rumba flamenca.

In 1998, Cook was nominated for a Juno Award as Instrumental Artist of the Year. In 2001, he received a Juno Nomination for Best Male Artist. In 2001, Cook won a Juno Award in the Best Instrumental Album category for Free Fall. In 2009, he was Acoustic Guitar's Player's Choice Award silver winner in the Flamenco category (gold went to Paco de Lucia). He is a three-time winner of the Canadian Smooth Jazz award for Guitarist of the Year and has received numerous other awards.

In 2011, Cook began filming, directing, and editing his own music videos with the release of Virtue. He has since directed, filmed, and edited eight music videos, 16 episodes of Friday Night Music, and produced, edited, and mixed the PBS Concert Special Jesse Cook, Beyond Borders.

Cook has said of his music: "If you go to Spain and you play [my] music, they’ll say, what is this? They don’t recognize it as Flamenco because it’s not; it’s a hybrid. I love Flamenco, but I also love world music: jazz, pop, Brazilian Samba, and Persian music."

== Discography ==
- Tempest (Narada Equinox, 1995)
- Gravity (Narada Equinox, 1996)
- Vertigo (Narada World, 1998)
- Free Fall (Narada World, 2000)
- Nomad (Narada World, 2003)
- Montréal (Narada, 2005)
- Frontiers (Koch, 2007)
- The Rumba Foundation (Koch, 2009)
- The Blue Guitar Sessions (eOne, 2012)
- One World (eOne, 2015)
- Beyond Borders (eOne, 2017)
- Libre (One World, 2021)
- Love in the Time of COVID (One World, 2023)

=== Video albums ===
Concert Specials / DVDs Title	Album details	Certifications	Nominations/Awards
One Night at the Metropolis	2007 DVD – EMI	Platinum	DVD Nominated Juno Award – Music DVD of the Year
The Rumba Foundation	2009 DVD – EMI		
Jesse Cook: Live in Concert	2012 DVD – Coach House Films		
Jesse Cook: Live at the Bathurst Street Theatre	2013 DVD – Coach House Films		
Jesse Cook: Beyond Borders	2019 DVD – Coach House Films		

== Other appearances ==
- Enchantment (2001) Charlotte Church
- Camino Latino (2002) Liona Boyd
- Seed (2003) Afro Celt Sound System

== See also ==
- New Flamenco
- Flamenco rumba
