= Lola Beltrán =

Mexican actress and singer (1932–1996)

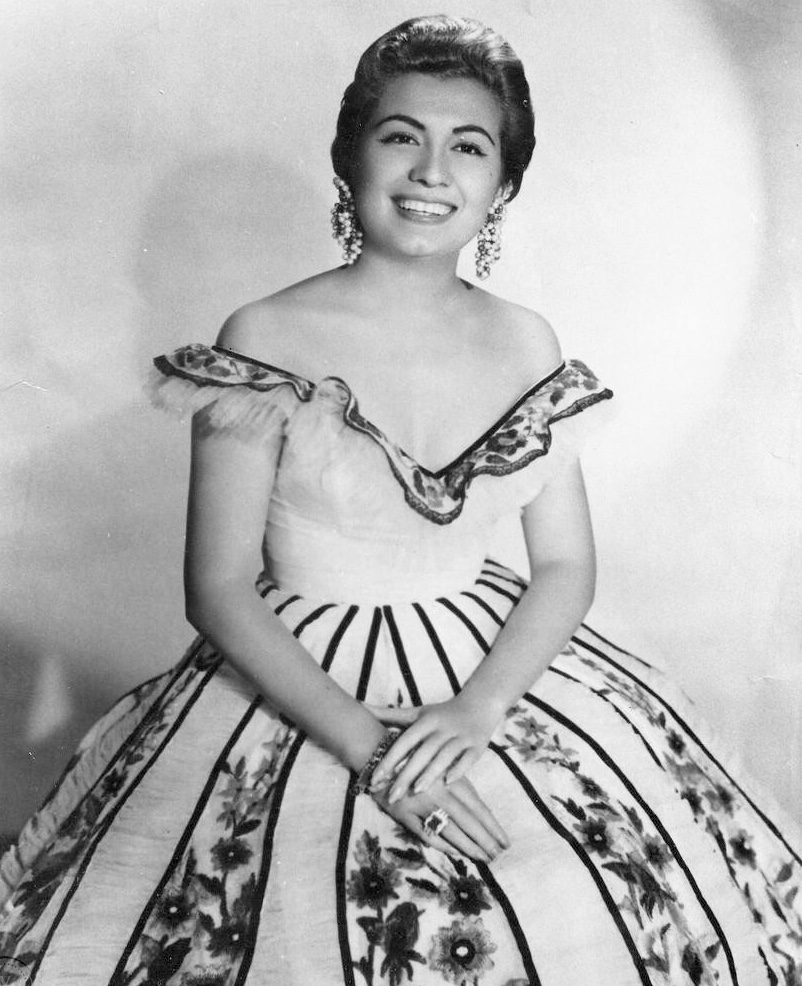
- Beltrán in 1956
- Born: María Lucila Beltrán Ruiz; 7 March 1932; El Rosario, Sinaloa, Mexico
- Died: 24 March 1996 (aged 64); Mexico City, Mexico
- Resting place: Church of Our Lady of the Rosary
- Other name: Lola la Grande
- Occupations: Singer; actress
- Spouse: Alfredo Leal
- Children: María Elena Leal Beltrán
- Musical career
- Genre: Regional Mexican
- Instrument: Vocals
- Years active: 1940–96
- Labels: Peerless; RCA Victor

Signature
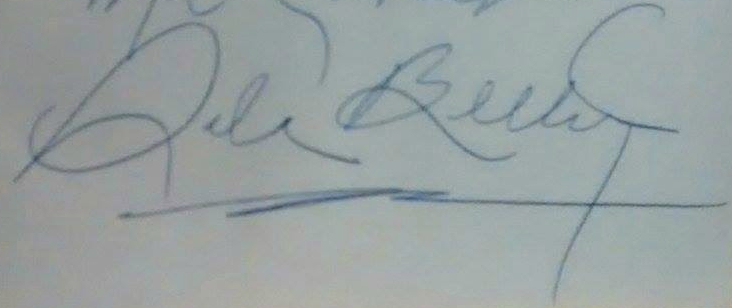

María Lucila Beltrán Ruiz (Note: In this Spanish name, the first or paternal surname is Beltrán and the second or maternal family name is Ruiz.) (7 March 1932 – 24 March 1996), known as Lola Beltrán, was a Mexican singer and actress, specialized in the musical genres of ranchera, huapango and Sinaloan wind band.

She is and was one of Mexico's most acclaimed singers of Ranchera and Huapango music. She collaborated with other Mexican music stars such as Amalia Mendoza, Juan Gabriel, and Lucha Villa. She was internationally renowned for her interpretation of the songs "Cucurrucucú paloma" and "Paloma Negra" and sang before world leaders. She was nicknamed Lola la Grande ("Lola the Great"). Her song Soy infeliz ("I'm Unhappy") was the opening music for Pedro Almodóvar's film Women on the Verge of a Nervous Breakdown.

== Life ==
Beltrán was born in the town of El Rosario, Sinaloa where she was schooled by Carmelite nuns. Her mother enjoyed singing and her father managed a mine. She completed secretarial studies while participating in singing competitions. She was intrigued by ballads and the singing she heard in church. Eventually, Beltrán and her mother moved to Mexico City so that she could find a career performing. Beltrán worked as a secretary at a Mexican radio station, XEW. She pestered the radio station to be allowed to sing. The station and listeners were so impressed that within a year she had her own radio show. Beltrán credits the station with giving her a chance, which enabled her to make a career. It was there that she met the songwriter Tomás Méndez who composed songs for her, including the international hits "Cucurrucucú paloma" and "Tres Dias".

Beltrán was the first wife of the matador and film actor Alfredo Leal Kuri and had a daughter with him, singer María Elena Leal. She entered the world of film in 1954 in El Tesoro de la Muerte. After appearing in dozens of films, most of them musicals, she obtained a starring role in the telenovela Mi rival with Saby Kamalich. In cinema, Beltrán made her film debut on El cantor del circo (1940), an Argentine film. She also shared credits with Mexican movie stars such as Emilio Fernández, Ignacio López Tarso, Katy Jurado, María Félix and Pedro Armendáriz in La Bandida (1962). Her last film appearance was in Una gallina muy ponedora (1982) sharing credits with Columba Domínguez.

As a television presenter, she hosted the programs Noches tapatías (1976) and her own television program entitled El estudio de Lola Beltrán (1984), programs in which she received stars such as Cornelio Reyna, Juan Gabriel, Lucha Villa, La Prieta Linda and Luis Miguel.

Beltrán is considered one of the most successful ranchera artists of all time. She gave concerts before various world leaders: President Charles de Gaulle of France, the leader of Yugoslavia Josip Broz Tito, Soviet foreign minister Andrei Gromyko, General Secretary of the Communist Party of the Soviet Union Leonid Brezhnev, King of Spain Juan Carlos I and Queen Sofia, Queen Elizabeth II, American Presidents Dwight D. Eisenhower, John F. Kennedy, Lyndon B. Johnson and Richard Nixon and Presidents of Mexico Adolfo Ruiz Cortines and Carlos Salinas de Gortari.

She was the first ranchera singer to perform at the Palacio de Bellas Artes (Palace of Fine Arts), the premier opera house and concert hall in Mexico. She also sang in the Olympia Music Hall in Paris, the Tchaikovsky Hall in Moscow and the Conservatory of Leningrad (now Saint Petersburg) in the former Soviet Union.

Beltrán was honored in 1995 with her inclusion into a series of commemorative postage stamps, issued by her native Mexico, honoring 'Popular Idols of Radio'. This was done in recognition of her lifetime achievement in the realm of popular music and her success in spreading an appreciation of Mexican culture throughout the world.

== Death ==
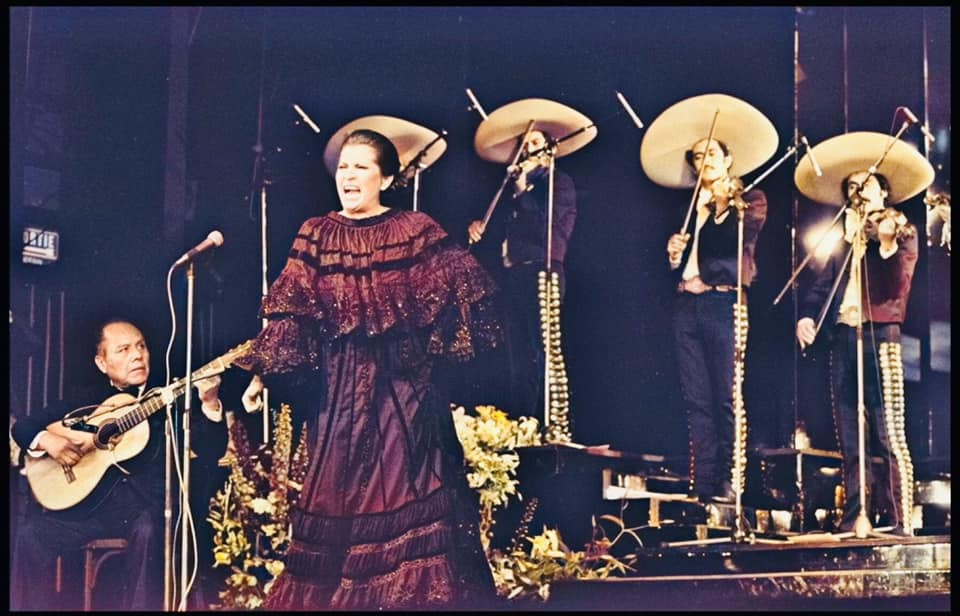
Lola Beltran at the Olympia (Paris), 1979

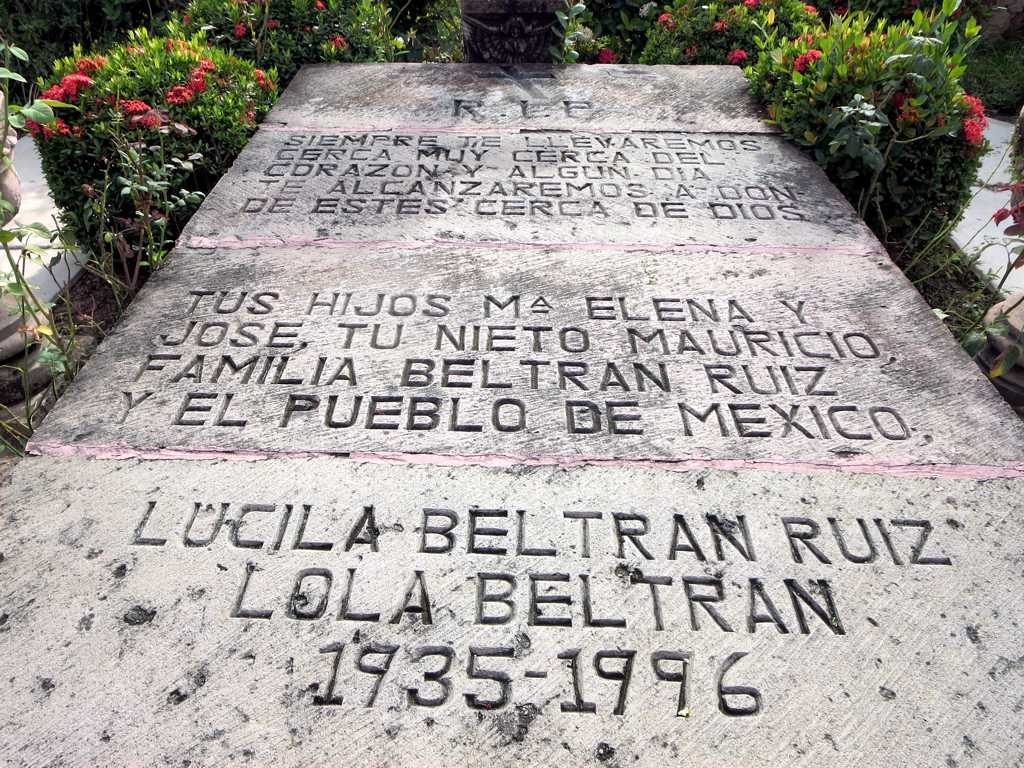
Beltrán's grave with wrong birthdate at Church of Our Lady of the Rosary in El Rosario, Sinaloa

On March 24, 1996, soon after recording Disco del Siglo (English: Album of the Century) with Lucha Villa and Amalia Mendoza "La Tariácuri" and produced by Juan Gabriel, Beltrán died of a pulmonary embolism at Hospital Ángeles in Mexico City. She had appeared in about 50 films and recorded about a hundred albums. Her body was laid on display in the rotunda of the Palacio de Bellas Artes (Palace of Fine Arts) in Mexico City.

== Filmography ==
=== Telenovelas ===
Year	Title	Role	Notes
1973	Mi rival	Lola	19 episodes

=== Television shows ===
Year	Title	Role	Notes
1976	Nachos tapatias		Host
1982	El estudio de Lola Beltrán		Host

=== Films ===
==== Cinema of Argentina ====
Year	Title	Role	Notes
1940	El Cantor del circo		

==== Cinema of Mexico ====
Year	Title	Role	Notes
1954	El taco de la muerte		
1954	La Desconocida		
1955	Bluebeard (Los lios de Barba Azul)	doña Lola Bárbara Beltrán	
1955	Al diablo las mujeres		
1953	Espaldas mojadas		
1955	Soy un golfo		
1955	Pueblo quieto		
1955	Camino de Guanajuato		
1955	De carne somos		
1956	Una movida chuecaa		
1956	Con quién andan nuestras hijas?	Prieta de Xochimilco	
1956	Pensión de artistas		
1957	Rogaciano el huapanguero		
1957	Donde las dan las toman		
1958	Guitarras de medianoche		
1958	Música en la noche		
1958	It Happened in Mexico (Sucedió en México)		
1960	¡Qué bonito amor!		
1960	Las canciones unidas		
1961	México Lindo y Querido		
1961	¿Dónde Estás Corazón?		
1961	La joven mancornadora		
1961	Besito a papá		
1962	Camino de la horca	Lupe	
1962	La Bandida	Cantante de palenque (Singer of palenque)	
1963	The Paper Man (El hombre de papel)	Puestera	Voice
1963	Baila mi amor		
1964	México de mi corazón		
1964	El revólver sangriento	Carmen	
1964	Canción del alma	Lola	
1965	Los Hermanos Muerte'		
1965	Cucurrucucú Paloma	Paloma Méndez	
1966	Tirando a gol		
1966	Matar es fácil		
1968	Valentín de la Sierra		
1969	Duelo en El Dorado		
1971	Furias bajo el cielo		
1972	Padre nuestro que estás en la tierra	Matilde	
1975	Me caíste del cielo	Lupita	
1975	Las fuerzas vivas	Chabela, Eufemio's wife	
1982	Una gallina muy ponedora		

==== Cinema of Spain ====
Year	Title	Role	Notes
1947	Song of Dolores		
