= David Arkenstone discography =

- Studio albums: 81
- Soundtrack albums: 17
- Live albums: 1
- Compilation albums: 7

The discography of David Arkenstone consists of nearly 80 studio albums, six collaboration albums, seven compilation albums, one live album, and seventeen soundtracks/video game scores. The Arkenstone collaboration albums include five albums with his trio, Troika and one album with Nicholas Gunn as Briza Additionally, he has composed a number of songs for the video game World of Warcraft.

== Albums ==
=== Studio albums ===
Year	Album details	Label	Release date	Notes
1987	Valley in the Clouds	Narada		
1989	Island	Narada		with Andrew White
1990	Citizen of Time	Narada		
1991	In the Wake of the Wind	Narada		
1992	The Spirit of Olympia	Narada		with Kostia and David Lanz
1994	Another Star in the Sky	Narada		
1995	Quest of the Dream Warrior	Narada		
1996	Return of the Guardians	Narada		
1996	Convergence	Narada		with David Lanz
1997	Spirit Wind	Windham Hill	Mar 1997	
1997	Enchantment: A Magical Christmas	Narada	Sep 1997	
1998	The Celtic Book of Days	Windham Hill		
1999	Citizen of the World	Windham Hill		
2000	Caravan of Light	Narada		
2001	Frontier	Paras	Jan 2001	
2001	Music Inspired by Middle Earth	Neo Pacifica		
2002	Avalon – A Celtic Legend	Paras	Feb 19, 2002	with Diane Arkenstone, collectively as Enaid
2002	Spirit of Tibet: A Musical Odyssey	Green Hill	Jun 2002	
2002	Sketches from an American Journey	Paras	Jun 2002	
2002	The Grand Circle	Paras	Aug 2002	with Diane Arkenstone, collectively as Ah Nee Mah
2003	Spirit of Ireland	Green Hill	Jan 2003	
2003	Christmas Pan Pipes	Green Hill	Mar 2003	
2003	Oddysea ... A Musical Voyage	Neo Pacifica		
2003	Spirits of the Rain Forest	Green Hill	Jul 2003	with Diane Arkenstone, collectively as Adventure Cargo
2003	African Skies	Neo Pacifica	Aug 2003	with Diane Arkenstone, collectively as Adventure Cargo
2003	Christmas Spirit	Village Square	Nov 2003	
2004	Echoes of Egypt	Neo Pacifica	Feb 2004	with Diane Arkenstone, collectively as Adventure Cargo
2004	Caribbean Dreams	Village Square	May 2004	
2004	Atlantis: A Symphonic Journey	Narada	Sep 2004	
2006	Celtic Sanctuary	Green Hill	Dec 2006	with Kathleen Fisher
2006	Celtic Christmas	Village Square	Sep 14, 2006	
2007	Myths & Legends	Gemini Sun	May 2007	
2008	Celtic Romance	Green Hill	Jan 2008	with Kathleen Fisher
2008	Tropical Morning	Green Hill	Jun 3, 2008	Natural Wonders Coll.
2008	Ocean Dreams	Green Hill	Jun 3, 2008	Natural Wonders Coll.
2008	Journey of the Whales	Green Hill	Jun 3, 2008	Natural Wonders Coll.
2008	Gentle Rain	Green Hill	Jun 3, 2008	Natural Wonders Coll.
2008	Healing Waters	Green Hill	Jun 3, 2008	Natural Wonders Coll.
2008	Windscapes	Green Hill	Jun 3, 2008	Natural Wonders Coll.
2008	Echoes of Light and Shadow	Gemini Sun	Jun 24, 2008	
2008	Be Thou My Vision: Celtic Hymns	Green Hill	Jul 2008	with Kathleen Fisher
2008	Christmas Lounge	Green Hill	Oct 28, 2008	
2009	Chillout Lounge	Green Hill	Feb 24, 2009	
2009	Native Spirit	Green Hill	Sep 29, 2009	
2009	Caribbean Nights	Green Hill	Jul 28, 2009	
2010	Celtic Chillout	Green Hill	Apr 20, 2010	
2010	The Magic Light of the Colorado Plateau	Oakenshield	Jul 15, 2010	digital download only
2010	Seasons of the Great Smoky Mountains	Oakenshield	Jul 15, 2010	digital download only
2010	Snowfall	Oakenshield	Jul 15, 2010	digital download only
2010	Star Windows	Oakenshield	Jul 15, 2010	digital download only
2010	Rhythms of the Ocean	Primary Wave Music	Jul 15, 2010	
2011	Ambient World	Domo Records	Feb 8, 2011	
2012	Spa - Bliss	Green Hill	Jan 1, 2012	
2012	Spa - Reflection	Green Hill	Jan 1, 2012	
2012	Spa - Touch	Green Hill	Jan 1, 2012	
2012	One Hour of Nature Music	Green Hill	Oct 22, 2012	
2013	Loveren	Megaforce	Mar 5, 2013	with Charlee Brooks
2013	Barcelona Lounge No. 1	QDV Recordings	May 7, 2013	with Benise
2014	Celtic Romance (2014)	Somerset Group, Ltd.	Jan 1, 2014	
2014	Native Chill	Green Hill	Sep 16, 2014	
2014	Celtic Garden	Green Hill	Mar 3, 2014	with Charlee Brooks
2015	Inamorata	Green Hill	Feb 3, 2015	with Charlee Brooks
2015	Barcelona Nights	Green Hill	May 12, 2015	
2015	Native Dreams	Green Hill	Sep 11, 2015	
2016	Parisian Nights	Green Hill	Jan 15, 2016	
2016	Beneath a Darkening Sky	QDV Recordings	Jul 12, 2016	
2016	Songs from the Aqua Lounge	QDV Recordings	Aug 23, 2016	
2016	The Fairy Garden	Green Hill	Sep 23, 2016	
2016	Winter Fantasy	Green Hill	Oct 21, 2016	with Charlee Brooks
2017	Italian Nights	Green Hill	Jan 27, 2017	with Seth Osburn
2017	Native Christmas	Green Hill	Oct 20, 2017	
2018	Parisian Lounge	Green Hill	Feb 23, 2018	
2018	Colors of the Ambient Sky	QDV Recordings	Jul 13, 2018	
2019	Fairy Dreams	Green Hill	Jan 18, 2019	
2019	Pure Sleep	Green Hill	Apr 12, 2019	
2019	Desert Spa	Green Hill	Sep 27, 2019	
2020	Celtic Spa	Green Hill	Feb 7, 2020	
2020	The Delicate Balance (EP)	Bandcamp	Jun 10, 2022	
2020	Fairy Tales	Green Hill	Aug 7, 2020	
2020	The Turning of the Year	Green Hill	Aug 28, 2020	with The California String Quartet
2021	Celtic Chillout Beats	Green Hill	Feb 19, 2021	
2021	Solitude	Bandcamp	Sep 24, 2021	
2021	Pangaea	Next Level	Aug 18, 2021	with Wouter Kellerman
2022	Avalon - Between Earth & Sky	Neo Pacifica	Jan 7, 2022	with Diane Arkenstone
2022	Music Inspired by Middle Earth vol.II	QDV Recordings	Jun 10, 2022	
2022	Native Heart	Green Hill	Jul 29, 2022	
2022	Moments	Seize The Day Entertaining	Sep 9, 2022	with Assia Ahhatt
2023	Winterlüde	David Arkenstone	Sep 13, 2023	
2024	Quest For The Runestone	Dream Palace Publishing	Jul 1, 2024	
2024	Fairy Fantasy	Green Hill Productions	Oct 25, 2024	

=== Troika Series ===
(composed by David Arkenstone; performed, produced and recorded by Troika)

Year	Album	Label	Released	Notes
1996	Troika I: Goddess	Narada	Aug 13, 1996	
1997	Troika II: Dream Palace	Narada	Apr 22, 1997	
1999	Troika III: Faeries: A Realm of Magic and Enchantment	Narada	Jun 15, 1999	
2000	Troika IV: Shaman	Narada	Jun 6, 2000	
2003	Troika V: Kingdom of the Sun	Narada	Feb 11, 2003	

=== Briza ===
(composed by David Arkenstone and Nicholas Gunn)

Year	Album	Label	Released	Notes
2010	Ambient Cafe	QDV Productions	Jul 15, 2010	

=== Live albums ===
Year	Title	Label	Released	Notes
2008	Live!	Gemini Sun Records	Jun 10, 2008	CD + DVD, With N. Gunn, J. Linstead, L. Gold

=== Compilation albums ===
Year	Title	Label	Released	Notes
1993	Chronicles	Narada	Apr 27, 1993	
1998	Eternal Champion	Narada	Mar 10, 1998	
2002	Visionary	Narada	Jan 29, 2002	
2005	Dream Palace	Green Hill	Jan 1, 2005	movie collection - produced by David Arkenstone
2005	Best of David Arkenstone	Narada	Oct 4, 2005	
2010	The Best of David & Diane Arkenstone	Eversound	Mar 9, 2010	
2011	Celtic Journeys: A David Arkenstone Celtic Collection	Narada	Mar 1, 2011	

=== Compilation Appearances ===
Year	Title	Label	Released	Notes
1990	Narada Christmas Collection	Narada	Oct 25, 1990	
1991	A Childhood Remembered	Narada	1991	
1991	Narada Collection 3	Narada	Apr 2, 1991	
1993	Narada Collection 4	Narada	Feb 2, 1993	
1995	Christmas Blessings	Narada	Oct 3, 1995	
1997	A Winter's Solstice VI	Windham Hill	1997	
1998	The Renaissance Album	Windham Hill	1998	
2002	A Peaceful Christmas	Time Life Records	Sep 17, 2002	
2003	The Celtic Circle	Windham Hill	Oct 7, 2003	
2005	A Quiet Revolution	Windham Hill	2005	

=== Soundtracks ===
Year	Title	Label	Released	Notes
1993	Robot Wars	Moonstone		
1998	Lands of Lore: Guardians of Destiny	Westwood Studios		with Frank Klepacki
1998	Himalayan Passage	Uni/Northsound		
1999	Lands of Lore III	Westwood Studios		with Frank Klepacki
2001	Emperor: Battle for Dune	Westwood Studios		with Frank Klepacki and Jarrid Mendelson
2002	Earth & Beyond	Westwood Studios		with Frank Klepacki
2003	Shadowbane	Stoneworks		
2007	World of Warcraft: The Burning Crusade	Blizzard Entertainment		Additional music
2007	World of Warcraft: Taverns of Azeroth	Blizzard Entertainment	BlizzCon 2007	composed track: "Themes of Taverns"
2008	Battlefield: Bad Company	DICE		composed tracks: "Night Riding" and "Surf Pirates"
2008	Space Siege	Gas Powered Games		with Howard Mostrom
2008	World of Warcraft: Wrath of the Lich King	Blizzard Entertainment		with: Russell Brower, Jason Hayes, Derek Duke, Glenn Stafford
2010	World of Warcraft: Cataclysm	Blizzard Entertainment		with: Neal Acree, Russell Brower, Derek Duke, Glenn Stafford
2010	Echoes of Creation	Oakenshield Recordings		
2012	MIB: Alien Crisis	Fun Labs		composed track: "Chase This"
2014	Starlight Inception	Escape Hatch Entertainment		
2018	World of Warcraft: Battle for Azeroth	Blizzard Entertainment		Additional composer
2020	World of Warcraft: Shadowlands	Blizzard Entertainment		Additional composer
2022	World of Warcraft: Dragonflight	Blizzard Entertainment		Additional composer
2024	World of Warcraft: The War Within	Blizzard Entertainment		Additional composer
2026	World of Warcraft: Midnight	Blizzard Entertainment		Additional composer
2026	Dungeons & Dragons: Dungeon Masters Official Soundtrack	Hasbro		Additional composer

== See also ==
- Benise
