= Robo Warriors =

- Directed by: Ian Barry
- Screenplay by: Michael Berlin
- Based on: Characters by Stuart Gordon
- Produced by: Loucas George; Cirio H. Santiago
- Starring: James Remar; Kyle Howard
- Cinematography: John Stokes
- Edited by: Tom Walls
- Music by: Richard Band
- Production company: Stargate Films
- Distributed by: Paramount Home Media
- Release date: August 25, 1996
- Running time: 85 minutes
- Country: United States
- Language: English
- Budget: $3 million

Robo Warriors (also known as Robot Jox 3: 2086 Apocalypse) is a 1996 American post-apocalyptic mecha science-fiction film directed by Ian Barry.

== Cast ==
- James Remar as Ray Gibson
- Kyle Howard as Zach Douglas
- James Tolkan as Quon
- James Lew as Darius
- Dennis Creaghan as Dreesen
- Bernard Kates as Charlie Walters
- Terry Markwell as Molly Douglas
- James Wearing Smith as Brian Douglas
- Rudy Vic Del as Hubbell
- Paul Holmes as Ambassador Roget
- Joonee Gamboa as Master Kim
- Cris Aguilar as Kinto

== Production ==
The script for Robo Warriors began development as an unproduced sequel to Robot Jox titled Battle Jox written by Stuart Gordon. Paramount British Pictures, the Australian division of Paramount Pictures had acquired the screenplay which was re-written by Michael Berlin who had been best known as a writer for television such as MacGyver.

Production on the film took place in the Philippines. According to director Ian Barry, the film had a troubled production with Barry commenting:

Robo Warriors added a new dimension to Murphy’s Law; everything that could go wrong DID go wrong. From bribes, standover threats, feuding film family fisticuffs on set, to you name it. Everything was by the seat of the pants.

The visual effects and miniatures were created by Stargate Films under the direction of Sam Nicholson. Unlike the predecessor films Robot Jox and Robot Wars which used stop motion provided by David W. Allen for their giant robot effects, Robo Warriors utilized suit performers for its mecha scenes.

== Release ==
Robo Warriors was released direct-to-video in the United States on August 25, 1998. The film was released on Blu-ray by Vinegar Syndrome in 2025.

== See also ==
- Crash and Burn – 1990 film also released in some markets as a sequel to Robot Jox
