= Return of the Guardians =

Studio album by David Arkenstone
- Released: October 22, 1996
- Recorded: August 1996
- Genre: New age
- Length: 56:02
- Label: Narada
- Producer: David Arkenstone and Danny Chase

David Arkenstone chronology
Quest of the Dream Warrior (1995)	Return of the Guardians (1996)	Convergence (1996)

Professional ratings
Review scores
Source	Rating
Allmusic	3/5 stars

Return of the Guardians is an album by David Arkenstone, released in 1996. It is the final album in a trilogy that includes In the Wake of the Wind and Quest of the Dream Warrior. The album is based on a fantasy story by Arkenstone and Mercedes Lackey that appears in the booklet. It revolves around the characters of Andolin from In the Wake of the Wind and Kyla from Quest of the Dream Warrior. The album also comes with a fold-out map of the world in which the story is set. Of note is the prominent violin in several tracks. Unlike the previous album in the series, there are no songs sung by Arkenstone.

== Track listing ==
1. "Border Journey" – 4:16
2. "Trail of Tears" – 4:59
3. "Chosen Voices" – 6:29
4. "Winds of Change" – 5:12
5. "The Forgotten Lands" – 5:13
6. "Two Hearts" – 4:21
7. "City in the Clouds" – 6:27
8. "Mask" – 5:45
9. "Water of Life" – 8:52
  - "Out of Darkness"
  - "Transformation"
10. "Reunion" – 4:16
- All tracks composed by David Arkenstone except "Trail of Tears" by David Arkenstone and Dan Chase

== Personnel ==
- David Arkenstone – acoustic and electric guitars, piano, keyboards, flutes, Turkish saz, mandolin, bouzouki, cittern, harp, sound design
- Danny Chase – drums, percussion, additional engineering, sound design
- Sid Page – violin
- John Klemmer – soprano sax
- Wayne Lothian – bass
- Jay Leslie – flute
- Abdou M'boup – bugarabu, shakere, tama, sabar 'ndeer, bongo
- Carlos del Puerto Llera – bass on "Chosen Voices"
- Dash Arkenstone, David Evans – additional guitars on "Reunion"
- Val Arkenstone – drums on "Reunion"
- Diane Arkenstone – synthesizers
- Church of Scientology Choir – Marcia Powell, director; Carol Worthey, vocal arrangements
