= Chronicles (David Arkenstone album) =

Compilation album by David Arkenstone
- Released: 1993
- Recorded: 1986–1992
- Genre: New age
- Length: 74:14
- Label: Narada

David Arkenstone chronology
Robot Wars (1993)	Chronicles (1993)	Another Star in the Sky (1994)

Professional ratings
Review scores
Source	Rating
Allmusic	4.5/5 stars

Chronicles, released in 1993, is the first of David Arkenstone's several compilation albums.

== Track listing ==
1. "The North Wind"
2. "Ballet"
3. "Ancient Legend"
4. "Borderlands"
5. "The Rug Merchant"
6. "Passage"
7. "Stepping Stars"
8. "Firedance"
9. "Desert Ride"
10. "Voices of the Anasazi"
11. "Papillon (On the Wings of the Butterfly)"
12. "Hindu Holiday"
13. "From the Forge to the Field"
14. "Valley in the Clouds"
15. "Out of the Forest and Into the Trees"
16. "The Southern Cross"
17. "Glory"
