= The Spirit of Olympia =

Studio album by David Arkenstone and Kostia, with David Lanz
- Released: 1992
- Recorded: December 1991–January 1992
- Genre: New age
- Length: 63:01
- Label: Narada
- Producer: David Arkenstone and Kostia

David Arkenstone and Kostia, with David Lanz chronology
In the Wake of the Wind (1991)	The Spirit of Olympia (1992)	Robot Wars (1993)

Professional ratings
Review scores
Source	Rating
Allmusic	3/5 stars

The Spirit of Olympia is an album by David Arkenstone and Kostia, with David Lanz, released in 1992. It is a celebration of the Olympic Games and incorporates several musical styles from around the world.

== Track listing ==
1. "Prelude: Let the Games Begin!" – 4:03
2. "Savannah Runner" – 3:33
3. "Memories of Gold" – 3:14
4. "Keeper of the Flame" – 3:23
5. "From the Forge to the Field" – 3:35
6. "Heartfire" – 3:19
7. "Celebration" – 5:00
8. "Close Without Touching" – 5:24
9. "Glory" – 2:19
10. "A Night in the Village" – 14:44
  - "Zeus Sings" – 1:43
  - "Eastern Moon" – 2:44
  - "Catalonia" – 2:09
  - "Volga's Journey" – 1:50
  - "In the Shadow of Kilimanjaro" – 1:52
  - "On the Shores of Parana" – 2:37
  - "Festival of Olympia" – 1:49
11. "Walk with the Stars" – 4:45
12. "Marathon Man" – 5:29
13. "The Spirit of Olympia" – 3:41
- Tracks 1, 2, 7, 10, 12, and 13 composed by David Arkenstone and Kostia. Tracks 3, 5, 6, and 9 composed by David Arkenstone. Tracks 8 and 11 composed by Kostia. Tracks 4 composed by David Lanz.

== Personnel ==
- David Arkenstone – keyboards, acoustic and electric guitars, flute, pan flute, fretless bass, pennywhistle, accordion, mandolin, percussion, voices
- Kostia – piano, keyboards, voices, orchestrations
- David Lanz – keyboards on "Keeper of the Flame"
- Danny Chase – drums, percussion
- Tena Hess – flutes
- Daryl Stuermer – electric guitars on tracks 2, 5, and 11
- Warren Wiegratz – saxophone solo on "From the Forge to the Field"
- Jerome Franke – violin solo on "Close Without Touching", string section leader
- Eric Segnitz, Mike Giacobassi, Tim Klabunde, Lucia Lin – violins
- Helen Reich – viola
- Paul Gmeinder – cello
- Linda Edelstein – oboe
- John Seydewitz – congas, additional percussion
- Sandy Schubert – clarinet
- Barry Benjamin, Neil Kimel, James Treviranus – French horns
- David Lussier, Amy Peterson, Jonathon Winkle – trombones
- James Brus, Thomas Schlueter – trumpets
- Paul Speer – electric guitar on "Keeper of the Flame"
- Neal Speer – drums on "Keeper of the Flame"
- James Reynolds – sequencing on "Keeper of the Flame"
- Steven Ray Allen – bass on "Keeper of the Flame"
