= Caravan of Light =

Studio album by David Arkenstone
- Released: 2000
- Recorded: 2000
- Genre: New age
- Length: 57:32
- Label: Narada
- Producer: David Arkenstone

David Arkenstone chronology
Citizen of the World (1999)	Caravan of Light (2000)	Frontier (2001)

Professional ratings
Review scores
Source	Rating
AllMusic	2.5/5 stars

Caravan of Light is an album by David Arkenstone, released in 2000, on African themes and subjects, with some farther travels along the great caravan roads of the Old World. Once again Arkenstone combines elements of new age and world music with an orchestral, cinematic flair. It has an unusual number of tracks with vocals for his work.

== Track listing ==
1. "Inshallah" – 5:58
2. "Skies of Africa" – 4:25
3. "The Jade Mountain" – 5:30
4. "The Road to Zanzibar" – 4:55
5. "Jewels of the Night" – 6:00
6. "Dance in the Desert" – 5:59
7. "The Spice Road" – 3:42
8. "Rendezvous" – 5:29
9. "Under the Gypsy Moon" – 4:22
10. "Through the Marketplace" – 4:54
11. "Caravan of Light" – 5:40

== Personnel ==
- David Arkenstone – guitar, vocals on "Inshallah" & "Caravan of Light", bouzouki, percussion, ebow, programming, keyboards
- Don Markese – flutes, clarinet, saxophone, pennywhistle
- Charlie Bisharat – violin
- Karen Hwa-Chee Han – er-hu
- Chad Watson – bass
- John Wakefield – percussion, marimba
- Sather Charron – didgeridoo
- Diane Arkenstone – vocals on "Jewel of the Night", wood flutes, synthesizers
- Andre Manga – vocals on "Skies of Africa"
- Valerie Fahren – lead vocal on "The Road to Zanzibar"
- Carlos Murguia – vocals on "Under the Gypsy Moon"
