= The Celtic Book of Days =

Studio album by David Arkenstone
- Released: February 10, 1998
- Recorded: April 1996
- Genre: New age
- Length: 66:39
- Label: Windham Hill
- Producer: David Arkenstone

David Arkenstone chronology
| Enchantment: A Magical Christmas (1997) | The Celtic Book of Days (1998) | Citizen of the World (1999) |

Professional ratings
Review scores
| Source | Rating |
|---|---|
| Allmusic | 4.5/5 stars |

The Celtic Book of Days is an album by David Arkenstone, released in 1998. It is the first of two Celtic albums by Arkenstone, the other being Spirit of Ireland.

== Track listing ==
1. "Equos Fair" – 4:27
2. "Heart of Spring" – 4:47
3. "Stormcry" – 4:40
4. "Road to the Faire" – 5:28
5. "Light of the Water" – 4:36
6. "In the Ancient Time" – 3:35
7. "The Festival" – 5:06
8. "Yearning Hearts" – 4:22
9. "Behind Walls of Stone" – 5:20
10. "The Boats" – 5:04
11. "Cailleach's Whisper" – 3:34
12. "Children of the Sun" – 3:11
13. "The Turning of the Year" – 4:52
14. "The Dragon's Breath" – 3:29
15. "The Quest of Culhwch" – 4:54
- All tracks composed by David Arkenstone

== Personnel ==
- David Arkenstone – guitars, mandolin, pennywhistle, cittern, bass, keyboards, piano, melodica, bodhran, percussion, vocals, sound design
- Don Markese – flute, alto flute, bass flute, pennywhistle, piccolo, clarinet, soprano sax
- Eric Rigler – Uilleann pipes
- Sid Page, Joel Derouin – solo violins
- Danny Chase – drums, percussion
- Lisa Lynne – Celtic harp
- Frank Marocco – accordion
- John Clarke – oboe
- Dave Riddles – bassoon
- Chris Strand – voices
- Diane Arkenstone – xylophone on "In the Ancient Time" & "Children of the Sun", synthesizers on "Light of the Water", "In the Ancient Time", "Behind Walls of Stone" & "Children of the Sun"
- Fred Arkenstone – Arkenstrings
- Northern Voices – choir
