= Another Star in the Sky =

Studio album by David Arkenstone
- Released: 1994
- Genre: New age
- Length: 50:39
- Label: Narada
- Producer: David Arkenstone and Eric Lindert

David Arkenstone chronology
Chronicles (1993)	Another Star in the Sky (1994)	Quest of the Dream Warrior (1995)

Professional ratings
Review scores
Source	Rating
AllMusic	4/5 stars

Another Star in the Sky is an album by David Arkenstone released in 1994 on the Narada label. It was a groundbreaking album because up until this point, a lot of new-age music didn't have lyrics or even vocals. Arkenstone was able to create an album that successfully combined the style of new age music with lyrics to match. The CD release was one of the first CD album releases to be mixed for Dolby ProLogic surround sound.

== Track listing ==
1. "Pool of Radiance" – 5:15
2. "Far Far Away" – 4:09
3. "Light in the East" – 4:08
4. "Under the Canopy" – 4:22
5. "Voices of the Night" – 4:24
6. "Another Star in the Sky" – 4:49
7. "Taken by the Wind" – 5:23
8. "Canyon of the Moon" – 5:47
9. "Naked in the Wind" – 5:20
10. "Ride into Midnight" – 6:47
- All songs composed and arranged by David Arkenstone except 4 & 9 arranged by David Arkenstone, Dan Chase and Eric Lindert

== Personnel ==
- David Arkenstone – keyboards, piano, acoustic and electric guitars, fretless bass, bamboo flutes, percussion and all vocals
- Dan Chase – percussion, drums, data management, samples and effects
- Douglas Spotted Eagle – Native American flute on 9
- Novi Novog – viola on 5 & 8
- Jerome Franke, Mike Giacobassi, Timothy Klabunde, Karin Potts – violins
- Paul Gmeinder – cello
- Helen Reich – viola
- Linda Edelstein – English horn, oboe
- Kostia – orchestrations
- Produced by David Arkenstone and Eric Lindert
