= Quest of the Dream Warrior =

Studio album by David Arkenstone
- Released: 1995
- Genre: New age
- Length: 52:51
- Label: Narada
- Producer: Michael Whalen and David Arkenstone

David Arkenstone chronology
Another Star in the Sky (1994)	Quest of the Dream Warrior (1995)	Return of the Guardians (1996)

Professional ratings
Review scores
Source	Rating
Allmusic	4/5 stars

Quest of the Dream Warrior is an album by David Arkenstone, released in 1995. It is the second album in a trilogy that begins with In the Wake of the Wind and concludes with Return of the Guardians. The album is based on a fantasy story by Arkenstone and Mercedes Lackey that appears in the booklet. The album also comes with a fold-out map of the world in which the story is set. Three tracks contain vocals by Arkenstone: "Prelude: Tallis the Messenger", "The Voice" and "Road to the Sea". As with many David Arkenstone albums, the music often has an epic, cinematic feel and blends new age, rock and world music elements.

== Track listing ==
1. "Prelude: Tallis the Messenger" – 6:18
2. "Rhythms of Vision" – 4:44
3. "The Journey Begins: Kyla's Ride" – 5:21
4. "The Voice" – 5:02
5. "Dance of the Maidens" – 4:28
6. "The Magic Forest" – 5:25
7. "Road to the Sea" – 6:01
8. "The Temple of Vaal" – 5:36
9. "Wings of the Shadow" – 5:26
10. "Homecoming" – 4:23
- All tracks composed by David Arkenstone

== Personnel ==
- David Arkenstone – acoustic and electric guitars, lead and backing vocals, keyboards, programming, flute, pennywhistle, piano, Hammond organ
- Dan Chase – drums, percussion, programming
- Kyf Brewer – backing vocals
- Rory Dodd – backing vocals
- Diane Hanson – additional vocals
- David Weiss – Chinese flutes, recorder, flute, piccolo
- Minoko Yajima – violin
- Michael Whalen – Synclavier, keyboards
- Wayne Lothian – 6-string bass
- Russ Rizner – French horn
- Melanie Feld – oboe, English horn
- Masako Yanagito, Yong Kim, Ann Labin, Ann Leathers – violins
- Carol Landon, Maryhelen Ewing – violas
- Eugene Moye, Lanny Paykin – cellos
- Orchestrations by Leland Bond, David Arkenstone and Michael Whalen
