= In the Wake of the Wind =

Studio album by David Arkenstone
- Released: 1991
- Recorded: October 1989–January 1991
- Genre: New age
- Length: 60:59
- Label: Narada
- Producers: David Arkenstone and Eric Lindert

David Arkenstone chronology
Citizen of Time (1990)	In the Wake of the Wind (1991)	The Spirit of Olympia (1992)

Professional ratings
Review scores
Source	Rating
Allmusic	4.5/5 stars

In the Wake of the Wind is an album by David Arkenstone, released in 1991. It is the first album in a trilogy that includes Quest of the Dream Warrior and Return of the Guardians. The music is based on a fantasy story contained in the booklet that tells of a strange wind called The Lion's Breath and a young man named Andolin who desires to vanquish it. This album contains some of Arkenstone's most evocative, varied, and sweeping compositions and arrangements, with frequent use of orchestral instruments. It reached #1 on the Billboard New Age chart and received a Grammy nomination. The track "Morning Sun on the Sails" is dedicated to Aaron Copland. Its first track, "Papillon (On the Wings of the Butterfly)", played once every twenty minutes in the loop of songs played at Innoventions Plaza at Walt Disney World's Epcot from 1994 until 2021. The Glassmen Drum and Bugle Corps, from Toledo, Ohio performed arrangements of "Overture", "Morning Sun on the Sails", "The Lion's Breath", and "Sailing" as part of their 1993 field show for Drum Corps International, entitled, "A Voyage Through Imagination".

== Track listing ==
1. "Papillon (On the Wings of the Butterfly)" – 5:20
2. "Dark Dunes" – 3:12
3. "Not Too Far to Walk" – 4:13
4. "Borderlands" – 5:36
5. "The Rug Merchant" – 3:33
6. "Firedance" – 3:55
7. "The Southern Cross" – 5:21
8. "Overture" – 3:51
9. "The Stardancer" – 4:04
10. "Morning Sun on the Sails" – 2:35
11. "The Lion's Breath" – 3:18
12. "Dances of Jankayla"
  - "The Marketplace" – 1:02
  - "The Gypsy's Veil" – 1:12
  - "The Festival" – 2:51
13. "Discovery" – 3:26
14. "Emerald Dream" – 1:55
15. "Through the Gates" – 3:10
16. "Sailing" – 1:48
- All tracks composed by David Arkenstone

== Personnel ==
- David Arkenstone – keyboards, acoustic and electric guitars, flute, pan flute, fretless bass, pennywhistle, accordion, mandolin
- Daniel Chase – acoustic and electronic percussion, data management
- Tena Hess – flute
- Nancy Rumbel – oboe
- John Seydewitz – congas and additional percussion on "The Festival"
- Kostia – keyboards, orchestrations
- Deborah Hanks – clarinet
- Jerome Franke, Eric Segnitz, Tim Klabunde, Mike Giacobassi, Robert Hanford – violins
- Helen Reich – viola
- Paul Gmeinder – cello
- Gloria Hays – hammered dulcimer
- The Milwaukee Jewish Day School Choir
