= Burke's Law (1994 TV series) =

American crime drama television series

- Genre: Crime drama
- Based on: Burke's Law by Frank D. Gilroy
- Developed by: James L. Conway
- Starring: Gene Barry; Peter Barton; Danny Kamekona; Bever-Leigh Banfield
- Theme music composer: John E. Davis
- Composer: Christopher Klatman
- Country of origin: United States
- Original language: English
- No. of seasons: 2
- No. of episodes: 27

Production
- Executive producers: Aaron Spelling; E. Duke Vincent
- Producer: Joel J. Feigenbaum
- Production location: Pasadena, California
- Cinematography: David Plenn
- Editors: M. Edward Salier; Bob Bring
- Running time: 60 min
- Production company: Spelling Television

Original release
- Network: CBS
- Release: January 7, 1994 – July 28, 1995

Related
- Burke's Law (1963 series)

Burke's Law is an American crime drama television series that aired on CBS during the 1993–94 and 1994–95 television seasons. It was a revival of the 1960's original Burke's Law television series, and starred Gene Barry as millionaire cop Amos Burke, now deputy chief instead of a captain, and Peter Barton as his son Det. Peter Burke. It was produced by Spelling Television.

== Background ==
The revival of the show, which ran on CBS from 1994 to 1995, was produced by Aaron Spelling's production company. Although the final season of the original series had the character become an agent for the government, the revival retconned this and continued the premise of the first two seasons.

In the second incarnation, Burke is now a deputy chief, assisted by his son Peter (Peter Barton). The two are assisted by Medical Examiner Lily Morgan (Bever-Leigh Banfield), and Burke's Filipino driver Henry (Danny Kamekona). Burke and Henry raised Peter after the death of his mother when he was young; although they share a close bond, Burke and Peter can butt heads at times, particularly over Peter's impulsiveness.

The series shared several running gags with its original incarnation, such as Burke often being the object of much female interest — something passed onto his son — a variant of someone asking why Burke, a millionaire, is a cop, and Burke dispensing wisdom to his son and others in a professional manner, dubbed "Burke's Law". The revival, even more than the original program, was regarded as being largely camp. In a nostalgic touch, many of the guest stars were Barry's peers in 1960s cop shows and spy-fi programs, including Patrick Macnee (The Avengers) and Peter Graves (Mission: Impossible). Anne Francis appeared reprising the character Honey West (though she was called "Honey Best" for legal reasons).

== Cast ==
- Gene Barry as Chief Amos Burke
- Peter Barton as Det. Peter Burke
- Danny Kamekona as Henry
- Bever-Leigh Banfield as Lily Morgan
- Dom DeLuise as Vinnie Piatte

== Episodes ==
=== Series overview ===
Season	Episodes	Originally released	
Season	Episodes	First released	Last released
1	13	January 7, 1994	May 13, 1994
2	14	March 21, 1995	July 27, 1995

=== Season 1 (1994) ===
No. overall	No. in season	Title	Directed by	Written by	Original release date
1	1	"Who Killed the Starlet?"	Dennis Dugan	Chris Ruppenthal & James L. Conway (teleplay), Chris Ruppenthal (story)	January 7, 1994
When an actress (Denice D. Lewis) is murdered while filming a scene in a movie, in full view of the cast and crew, Amos and Peter investigate. They have a long list of suspects. Guest starring are Michelle Phillips, Polly Bergen, Gloria Loring, Gerald McRaney, Bret Michaels, George Segal, and Grant Show.
2	2	"Who Killed the Fashion King?"	Richard Lang	Bruce Franklin Singer	January 14, 1994
A disliked fashion designer (Nolan Miller) is murdered at his own fashion show. He is shot in the back with an ice arrow from an ice sculpture, in full view of everyone. Amos and Peter find many suspects who hate him. Guest starring are Josie Bissett, Carol Channing, James Eckhouse, Robert Guillaume, William Katt, and Connie Stevens.
3	3	"Who Killed Nick Hazard?"	Dennis Dugan	Joel J. Feigenbaum	January 21, 1994
At a convention for private investigators, a private investigator (Robert Sacchi) is murdered. He had several enemies in the detective community, so Peter and Amos have several suspects to investigate. Guest stars include Buddy Ebsen, Anne Francis, Martin Kove, Jameson Parker, and Tanya Roberts.
4	4	"Who Killed the Beauty Queen?"	Alan J. Levi	James L. Conway	January 28, 1994
When the frontrunner (Denise Richards) in a beauty contest is murdered, Peter and Amos have multitudes of suspects from which to choose. Then, the only witness (Paul Johansson) to the murder is killed before he can be questioned. Guest stars are Jennifer Aniston, Elizabeth Berkley, Diahann Carroll, Joanna Cassidy, Dean Stockwell, and Alan Thicke.
5	5	"Who Killed the Host at the Roast?"	Richard Lang	Michael Lewis Barry; Gene Barry	February 4, 1994
A comedian (Jack Carter) being honored at a roast by his peers is electrocuted in front of everyone. Peter and Amos investigate his death and discover various suspects who have motives. Milton Berle, Corey Feldman, Elliott Gould, Gavin MacLeod, Rue McClanahan, Ed McMahon, Tracy Scoggins, Peter Scolari, and Tori Spelling have guest-star roles.
6	6	"Who Killed Alexander the Great?"	Charles Correll, Richard Lang	Joel Blasberg (s/t), Richard Levinson (s), William Link (s)	March 4, 1994
A famous magician named Alexander (John Astin) is murdered while performing a trick in front of other magicians, and no one can figure out how it was accomplished. Peter and Amos realize the other magicians are jealous of Alexander. Guest stars include Melissa Sue Anderson, Tom Bosley, Meagen Fay, Mark Hamill, Roddy McDowall, and Audrey Meadows.
7	7	"Who Killed the Soap Star?"	Richard Lang	Sean Clark	March 11, 1994
When the star (Kimberley Simms) of a popular daytime soap arrives at the annual awards show, she is murdered on the red carpet in full view of a television audience. Peter and Amos have many suspects from whom to choose. James Brolin, David Faustino, Bonnie Franklin, John Schneider, and Hunter Tylo guest-star in this episode.
8	8	"Who Killed Romeo?"	Christopher Hibler	Roger Lowenstein	April 1, 1994
A philandering hairstylist (Ian Ogilvy) is murdered with his own hair spray. Peter and Amos have a plethora of suspects and jilted lovers. Guest stars in this episode include Dick Butkus, Morgan Fairchild, Eva Gabor, Florence Henderson, Finola Hughes, Tiffani Thiessen, and Jesse White.
9	9	"Who Killed the Legal Eagle?"	Christopher Hibler	Joel J. Feigenbaum	April 8, 1994
When an unscrupulous, ambulance-chasing lawyer (Dave Coulier) is run down by a speeding ambulance, it is considered murder by the police. Peter and Amos find many suspects who do not like shysters. Twins Brittany and Cynthia Daniel guest-starred in this episode as Ginny and Jinny, along with Kristian Alfonso, Sherman Hemsley, Linda Purl, David Rasche, Claire Yarlett, and Efrem Zimbalist Jr.
10	10	"Who Killed Good Time Charlie?"	Jefferson Kibbee	Bruce Franklin Singer	April 15, 1994
When a man (Rick Dees), noted for his incessant practical jokes, is found at a hotel frozen to death on a hot summer day, Peter and Amos find plenty of suspects who wished him dead. Guest stars include Kevin Dobson, Mary Frann, Don Knotts, Martin Mull, Jane Sibbett, and Parker Stevenson.
11	11	"Who Killed the Romance?"	Gilbert M. Shilton	Bruce Franklin Singer	April 29, 1994
Someone takes sweet revenge on a tacky romance novelist (Stella Stevens) by putting boom-booms in her bon-bons. Valerie Perrine and Shirley Jones also guest-star, along with Don Diamont, Shirley Jones, Brian Keith, Tracy Nelson, and Valerie Perrine.
12	12	"Who Killed Skippy's Master?"	Christian Nyby II	Thomas C. Chapman	May 6, 1994
A man (Mark DeCarlo) is murdered, leaving only his dog as a witness. Later, his veterinarian (Dick Van Patten) is murdered, leaving Peter and Amos to question why the dog had not barked at the killer. Stephanie Beacham, Morgan Brittany, Steve Lawrence, Dusty Rhodes, and Dick Van Patten guest-star.
13	13	"Who Killed the Anchorman?"	Gilbert M. Shilton	James L. Conway, Joel J. Feigenbaum	May 13, 1994
Before he can leave the station for a new job, a TV anchorman (Peter Keleghan) ends with a deadly newscast. Peter and Amos have to find which of his co-workers is the killer. Guest-starring are Gary Collins, Mike Connors, Erin Gray, David Leisure, Gail O'Grady, and Meshach Taylor.

=== Season 2 (1995) ===
No. overall	No. in season	Title	Directed by	Written by	Original release date
14	1	"Who Killed the World's Greatest Chef?"	Michael Lange	Michael Lewis Barry; Gene Barry	March 21, 1995
Amos Burke sniffs out a celebrity chef's (Marty Ingels) circle of friends — who are ingredients for a recipe for murder. Guest starring Melody Anderson, Frankie Avalon, Kathleen Robertson, Barbara Rush, Doug Savant and Shadoe Stevens.
15	2	"Who Killed the Gadget Man?"	Dennis Dugan	Chris Brancato	March 28, 1995
When a ruthless TV-infomercial producer (Pat Harrington Jr.) with a host of enemies is murdered, suspicions fall on five of his disgruntled staffers. Guest starring Thomas Calabro, Nicole Eggert, Pat Harrington Jr., Howard Hesseman, Shirley Jones, Vicki Lawrence, and Rita Moreno.
16	3	"Who Killed the Motorcar Maverick?"	Gus Trikonis	Joel J. Feigenbaum	April 14, 1995
The president (Jon Cypher) of an electric-car company comes to a dead end while demonstrating his sleek prototype. Guest starring Elizabeth Ashley, David Birney, Erik Estrada, Debi Mazar, and Pat Morita.
17	4	"Who Killed the Highest Bidder?"	Chip Chalmers	Bruce Franklin Singer	April 28, 1995
The buyer (Doug McClure) of a reputedly cursed onyx jaguar is found with his throat slashed. Guest starring Loni Anderson, Cyd Charisse, Marcia Cross, Margot Kidder, and Charles Shaughnessy.
18	5	"Who Killed Mr. Game Show?"	Gus Trikonis	Thomas C. Chapman	May 5, 1995
Amos quizzes the stars and staff of a game show called Hangman to find clues to the gallows-style murder of the show's ruthless producer (Peter Marshall). Guest starring Richard Karn, Sally Kellerman, Lauren Lane, Belinda Montgomery, Lyle Waggoner, and Craig Richard Nelson.
19	6	"Who Killed the Lifeguard?"	Jefferson Kibbee	James L. Conway	May 25, 1995
A lifeguard (Paul Satterfield) is drowned in his pool and Burke investigates. They learn that he was a womanizer and among the women he's been with is another lifeguard, a VJ, a princess whom he promised he would marry, and a swimsuit designer. Also, the designer's ex-husband had reason to want him dead. Guest starring Downtown Julie Brown, Robert Desiderio, Debbe Dunning, Samantha Eggar, Catherine Hicks, and Eugene Lee.
20	7	"Who Killed the Centerfold?"	Noel Nosseck	Chris Brancato	June 1, 1995
A centerfold model (Lisa Stahl) is killed on the set of a photo shoot. Among the suspects is another model who was competing with her for the centerfold of the year; her former agent, who claims she stole something from her; a photographer whom she clashed with; the magazine's publisher, whom she's suing for sexual harassment; and her husband, a millionaire whom she's leaving and planning to take to the cleaners. Guest starring Anthony Geary, Robert Goulet, Leann Hunley, Perry King, and Romy Walthall.
21	8	"Who Killed the Movie Mogul?"	Tony Mordente	Joel J. Feigenbaum	June 8, 1995
Amos and Peter scare up a cast of suspects in the ghoulish murder of a horror movie mogul (Joseph Bologna). Guest starring Jason Bateman, Crystal Chappell, Christine Elise, Carol Potter, and Robert Vaughn.
22	9	"Who Killed the Toy Maker?"	Gilbert M. Shilton	James L. Conway	June 15, 1995
A toy company president (Adam West) meets his maker after his stuffed animal explodes in his hands. Guest starring June Allyson, Priscilla Barnes, J.D. Daniels, Bill Fagerbakke, and Peter Graves.
23	10	"Who Killed Cock-a-Doodle Dooley?"	Mike Vejar	Bruce Franklin Singer	June 22, 1995
Foul play is suspected in the death of a fried-chicken entrepreneur (Robert Mandan) who ruffled more than a few feathers and then was run down crossing the road. Guest starring Herb Edelman, Tawny Kitaen, Dan Lauria, Jon Polito, Doris Roberts, and Penny Santon.
24	11	"Who Killed the King of the Country Club?"	Dennis Dugan	Joel J. Feigenbaum	July 6, 1995
Wally King (Jed Allan), an obnoxious playboy and member of an exclusive country club, is found dead. Guest starring Greg Evigan, Carl Gordon, Harvey Korman, Darren McGavin, Marion Ross, Sheree J. Wilson.
25	12	"Who Killed the Sweet Smell of Success?"	Tony Mordente	Stanley Ralph Ross	July 13, 1995
The Chief smells murder in the scent of a perfumist (Monte Markham) whose heavenly new scent had him on Cloud Nine. Guest starring Jack Coleman, Robert Culp, Nancy Everhard, Heather Medway, and Loretta Swit.
26	13	"Who Killed the Hollywood Headshrinker?"	Walter Grauman	Bruce Franklin Singer	July 20, 1995
Someone in a shrink's group therapy sessions wants to terminate the therapy — and the therapist (Jeff Conaway). Then, another group member (Gary Burghoff) is killed before he can be questioned. Guest starring Marla Gibbs, Paula Prentiss, Jake Steinfeld, and Hunter Tylo.
27	14	"Who Killed the Tennis Ace?"	Gilbert M. Shilton	William Conway	July 28, 1995
An arrogant tennis player (Matthew Ashford) is killed when someone places a poisonous spider in his shoe box. So Amos and Peter, who knew the man, start by looking at the people who would have wanted to see him dead. Among them are his business manager whom he was considering firing; his former partner and ex-wife, whom he mistreated; his current girlfriend, who has a reputation as a bad girl and who has exotic pets like poisonous spiders; and the shoe company exec who's upset that he's trying to get out of a contract to endorse their shoes. Guest starring Mary Crosby, Michael Nouri, Stephanie Romanov, Nana Visitor, and William Windom.
