= Danny Kamekona =

American actor (1935 – 1996)

- Kamekona as Sato Toguchi in The Karate Kid Part II
- Born: November 5, 1935; Hilo, Hawaii
- Died: May 2, 1996 (aged 60); Los Angeles, California, U.S.
- Occupation: Actor
- Years active: 1968–1996
- Height: 168 cm (5 ft 6 in)
- Spouse: Michiko Kamekona
- Children: 2

Danny Kamekona (November 15, 1935 – May 2, 1996) was an American actor.

== Television and movie career ==
Kamekona began his acting career on television, debuting in a 1968 episode of Hawaii Five-O, one of 32 different appearances over 11 years. Other TV appearances included The Brian Keith Show; Sanford and Son (incidentally, as a Honolulu police detective in the three-part episode "The Hawaiian Connection", a nod to his Hawaii Five-O character); Barnaby Jones; six episodes of Magnum, P.I.; 21 Jump Street; L.A. Law; Walker, Texas Ranger; and his last TV appearance, in 1995's Burke's Law. He appeared as Agawa, employed by Riochi Tanaka in the episode "The Rising Sun Of Death" of the series Miami Vice.

The Karate Kid Part II was Kamekona's debut movie appearance in 1986. Other movie appearances included Black Widow, Problem Child, Honeymoon in Vegas, and his final movie appearance, 1993's Robot Wars.

== Death ==
Kamekona was found dead in his Los Angeles, California, apartment on May 2, 1996, at age 60. A heart attack was speculated; however, the exact cause of death was never revealed.

== Filmography ==
=== Film ===
Year	Title	Role	Notes
1986	The Karate Kid Part II	Sato Toguchi	
1987	Black Widow	Detective	
1988	Aloha Summer	Reverend	
1989	Collision Course	Oshima	
1989	Robot Jox	Dr. Matsumoto	
1990	Problem Child	Mr. Hirohito	
1990	Come See the Paradise	Mr. Nishikawa	
1991	Night of the Warrior	Chang	
1991	Goodbye Paradise	Lt. Nomura	
1992	Honeymoon in Vegas	Niko	
1993	Robot Wars	Wa-Lee	

=== Television ===
Year	Title	Role	Notes
1968–1980	Hawaii Five-O	Various characters	33 episodes
1981–1984	Magnum, P.I.	Various characters	6 episodes
1987	Miami Vice	Agawa	Episode: "The Rising Sun of Death"
1989	Tour of Duty	Moui	2 episodes
1989–1990	Jake and the Fatman	Lt. Kamalani/Makala	2 episodes
1991	L.A. Law	Yoshi Nakajima	Episode: "Mutinies on the Banzai"
1992	Santa Barbara	Mr. Taksan	3 episodes
1993	Raven	Takuya Makura	Episode: "Playback"
1993	Walker, Texas Ranger	Mitsua Usagi	Episode: "A Shadow in the Night"
1993	Wild Palms	Ushio	Episode: The Floating World" (Uncredited)
1993	Ultraman: The Ultimate Hero	Dr. Hasagawa	Episode: "Dino Might (Gomora)"
1994–1995	Burke's Law	Henry	Regular role; 27 episodes
