= Fairy Dreams =

Studio album by David Arkenstone
- Released: 2019
- Genre: New-age
- Label: Green Hill Productions

Fairy Dreams is a studio album by David Arkenstone, released by the record label Green Hill Productions in 2019. The album received a Grammy Award nomination for Best New Age Album.

== Track listing ==
1. Twinklelace Glen
2. The Water Fairy
3. Dream Shadows
4. Fairy Dreams
5. The Dazzleforest Dance
6. Nightfall
7. The Evening Bells
8. Tears Of The Forest
9. The Magic Fairies
10. The Fairy Pool
11. Starpool
12. The Magic Circle
- All tracks composed by David Arkenstone

== Personnel ==
- David Arkenstone – keyboards, guitar, percussion, panpipes
- Susan Craig Winsberg – flute
- Luanne Homzy - violin
