= Convergence (David Arkenstone and David Lanz album) =

Compilation album by David Arkenstone and David Lanz
- Released: November 19, 1996
- Genre: New age
- Length: 53:59
- Label: Narada

David Arkenstone and David Lanz chronology
| Return of the Guardians (1996) | Convergence (1996) | Spirit Wind (1997) |

Professional ratings
Review scores
| Source | Rating |
|---|---|
| Allmusic | 4.5/5 stars |

Convergence is an album by David Arkenstone and David Lanz, released in 1996. It is a compilation of tracks from Narada releases such as A Childhood Remembered and The Narada Wilderness Collection.

== Track listing ==
1. "Madre De La Tierra" (Lanz) – 3:23
2. "Yosemite" (Arkenstone) – 5:34
3. "Madrona" (Lanz) – 3:40
4. "The North Wind" (Arkenstone) – 6:42
5. "The Dragon's Daughter" (Lanz/Speer) – 4:40
6. "Long Way From Home" (Arkenstone) – 3:49
7. "A Thousand Small Gold Bells" (Arkenstone) – 6:08
8. "Oaks" (Lanz/Rumbel/Tingstad) – 4:40
9. "The Cello's Song" (Arkenstone/Kostia) – 7:07
10. "Love on the Beach" (Arkenstone) – 4:52
11. "Keeper of the Flame" (Lanz) – 3:24
