= Valley in the Clouds =

Studio album by David Arkenstone
- Released: 1987
- Recorded: July–December 1986
- Genre: New age
- Length: 40:46
- Label: Narada
- Producer: Eric Lindert and David Arkenstone

David Arkenstone chronology
Valley in the Clouds (1987)	Island (1989)

Professional ratings
Review scores
Source	Rating
Allmusic	5/5 stars

Valley in the Clouds is the debut album by David Arkenstone, released in 1987. Much of his trademark compositional style is already evident.

== Track listing ==
1. "Ancient Legend" – 3:54
2. "Stepping Stars" – 3:45
3. "Valley in the Clouds" – 3:35
4. "Princess" – 3:32
5. "Eastern Dream" – 4:49
6. "Night Wind" – 3:56
7. "Rain" – 5:41
8. "The Sun Girl" – 4:37
9. "Lost Temple" – 6:43
- All tracks composed by David Arkenstone

== Personnel ==
- David Arkenstone – keyboards, grand piano, guitar, harp, fretless bass
- Daniel Chase – organic and electronic percussion
