= Citizen of Time =

Studio album by David Arkenstone
- Released: 1990
- Recorded: May–October 1989
- Genre: New age
- Length: 48:50
- Label: Narada
- Producer: Eric Lindert and David Arkenstone

David Arkenstone chronology
Island (1989)	Citizen of Time (1990)	In the Wake of the Wind (1991)

Professional ratings
Review scores
Source	Rating
AllMusic	3/5 stars

Citizen of Time is an album by David Arkenstone released in 1990. The liner notes contain a short story about a character called The Citizen of Time. Each track relates to a part of his travels.

== Track listing ==
1. "Top of the World" – 4:47
2. "The Great Wall" – 4:42
3. "Firestix" – 4:00
4. "Out of the Forest and Into the Trees" – 4:35
5. "The Malabar Caves" – 3:28
6. "Voices of the Anasazi" – 4:40
7. "The Northern Lights" – 4:26
8. "Rumours of Egypt" – 5:59
9. "Splendor of the Sun" – 4:00
10. "Explorers" – 7:48
- All tracks composed by David Arkenstone

== Personnel ==
- David Arkenstone – keyboards, Korg M1, grand piano, guitar, bass, pennywhistle, flute
- Daniel Chase – percussion
- Tracy Strand – vocals
