= Music Inspired by Middle Earth =

Studio album by David Arkenstone
- Released: 2001
- Genre: New-age
- Length: 55:54
- Label: Neo Pacifica
- Producer: David and Diane Arkenstone

David Arkenstone chronology
Frontier (2001)	Music Inspired by Middle Earth (2001)	Visionary (2002)

Professional ratings
Review scores
Source	Rating
Allmusic	link

Music Inspired by Middle Earth is an album featuring David Arkenstone, released in 2001. The music is based on J.R.R. Tolkien's epic fantasy novel The Lord of the Rings. Even though it was released the same year as The Lord of the Rings: The Fellowship of the Ring, it was not inspired by nor related to the film.

== Track listing ==
1. "Prelude: Hobbits from the Shire" – 4:08
2. "The Road to Rivendell" – 3:39
3. "The Quest" – 5:28
4. "Moria" – 5:02
5. "Lothlórien" – 4:18
6. "Galadriel's Mirror" – 4:32
7. "The Riders of Rohan" – 4:24
8. "The Palantír" – 4:50
9. "Arwen and Aragorn" – 3:29
10. "To Isengard" – 4:25
11. "In the Land of Shadow" – 4:22
12. "The Field of Cormallen" – 3:33
13. "The Grey Havens" – 3:37
- All tracks composed by Diane and David Arkenstone

== Personnel ==
- David Arkenstone – keyboards, guitars, whistle, flute, melodica, mandolin, bouzouki, percussion
- Diane Arkenstone – keyboards, dulcimer, vocals, bells, synthesizers
- Don Markese – bawu, duduk, bansuri, ocarina
- John Wakefield – percussion
- Erica Foss, Ian Beyer, Adam Loovis, Jackie Randall, Donna Shubert, Sherie Tate, David Watkins, Dawn Davis, Sue Kendall, Daniel McConnell, Angela Niles, Deborah Powell – violins
- Gail Shepherd, Brian Heins, Beverly Langford, Alan Sloan, Barry Simpson, Jennifer Todd – viola
- Beverly Vaughn, Jeffrey Wright – cello
- Allen Frost, Don Sebesky – bass
- Jerome Goldman, David Grady, Joe Nielson, Greg Ryder – French horn
- Jerry Casey, Steve Medina – trumpet
- Janice Everett – oboe, English horn
- Becky Thatcher – harp
