= Crash and Burn (1990 film) =

1990 film

- DVD artwork
- Directed by: Charles Band
- Written by: J. S. Cardone
- Produced by: David DeCoteau; John Schouweiler
- Starring: Paul Ganus; Megan Ward; Jack McGee; Eva LaRue
- Cinematography: Mac Ahlberg
- Edited by: Ted Nicolaou
- Music by: Richard Band
- Production company: Full Moon Entertainment
- Distributed by: Paramount Home Video
- Release date: September 1990
- Running time: 85 minutes
- Country: United States
- Language: English

Crash and Burn is a 1990 American science fiction film directed by Charles Band. It was originally titled Robot Jox 2: Crash and Burn in most European markets, despite not being related to Band's 1990 film Robot Jox.

== Plot ==
Unicom is a powerful organization overseeing most of the world after its economic collapse. They have banned computers and robots in an attempt to ensure "life, liberty, and the pursuit of economic stability." When a Unicom Synth robot infiltrates a southwest TV station and kills the manager, a revolutionary against the gestapo-like corporation, a lowly Unicom delivery man, must help the rest of the station survive through the incoming "thermal storm."

== Cast ==
- Paul Ganus as Tyson Keen
- Megan Ward as Arren
- Ralph Waite as Lathan Hoaks
- Jack McGee as Winston Wickett
- Eva LaRue as Parice
- Bill Moseley as Quinn
- Elizabeth MacLellan as Sandra
- Katherine Armstrong as Christie
- John Chandler as Bud
- Kristopher Logan as "Scratch"

== Reception ==
The Evansville Courier & Press said it is "saddled with inane dialogue, wooden acting and a plot that is a textbook cliche."

== Release ==
Crash and Burn was officially titled Robot Jox 2 in most European markets at the time of release, but renamed when re-released on DVD. Despite the title, same opening theme, and involvement of Charles Band, and reused cover art, the plots of Robot Jox 2: Crash and Burn and Robot Jox are completely unrelated.

The film was released on DVD by Full Moon in 2000, but was discontinued for copyright reasons. The DVD contained a widescreen print of the film. The film was later released onto DVD again through the Charles Band DVD Collection, released in 2006. The boxset also contains Meridian: Kiss of the Beast, Doctor Mordrid, and Head of the Family. The film was again released on DVD by Shout! Factory on June 14, 2011, as a double feature DVD with Robot Wars. The film was released on Blu-ray for the first time on June 10, 2025.

== See also ==
- Robot Wars - a 1993 film also marketed as a sequel to Robot Jox
