= Roni Benise =

American musician

Benise
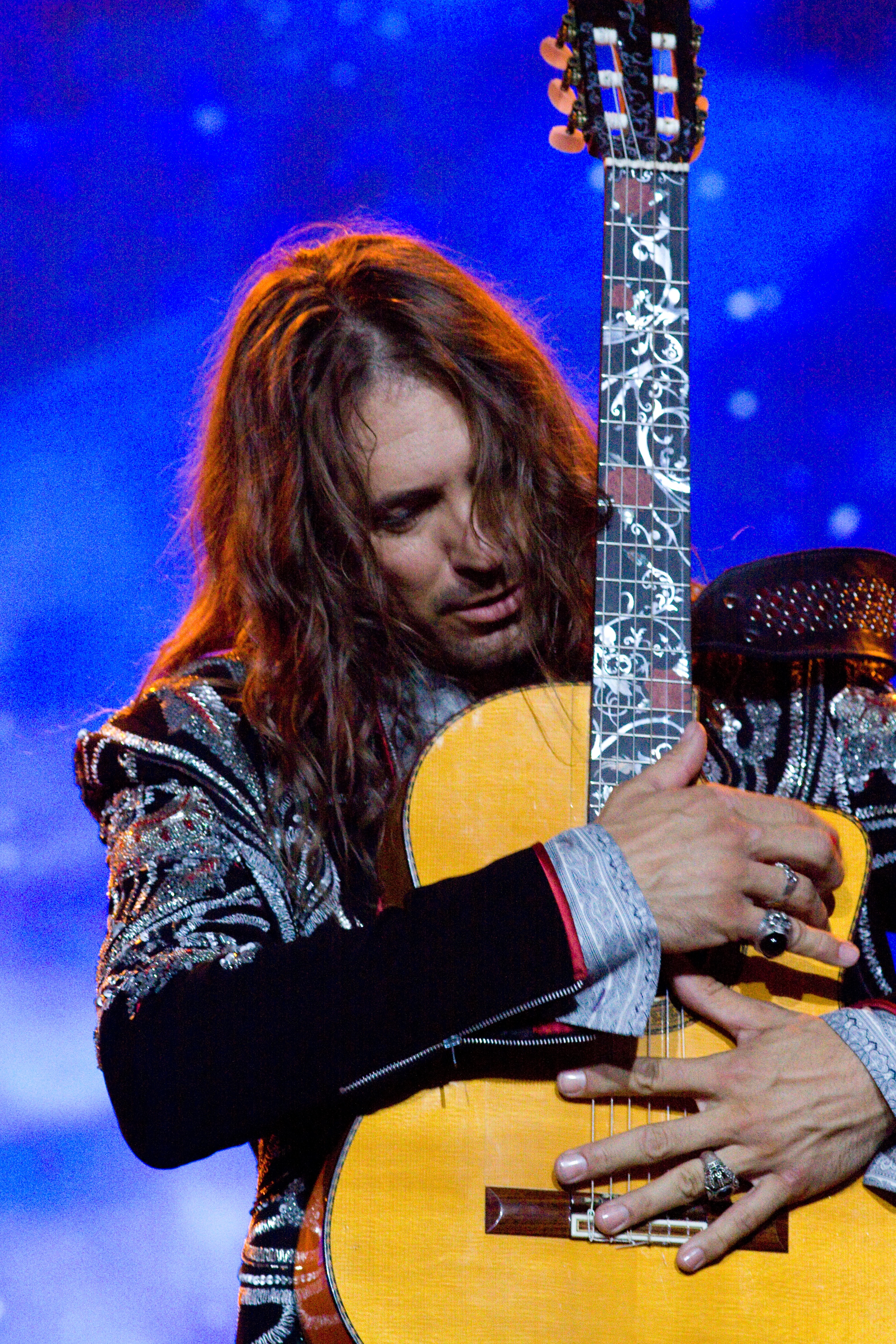
- Benise

Background information
- Born: January 10, 1965 (age 61); Kearney, Nebraska, United States
- Genres: Nuevo Flamenco, World, Spanish Guitar
- Occupations: Composer, guitarist, author, painter
- Instrument: Guitar
- Years active: 1999-present
- Label: Spanish Guitar Entertainment
- Website: benise.com

Roni Benise, is an American guitarist who describes his style as "Spanish guitar" or "nouveau flamenco."

After growing up on a small farm near Ravenna, Nebraska, Benise moved to Los Angeles, California, to pursue rock stardom. After hearing flamenco music on the radio, he switched from electric guitar to nylon-stringed classical guitar.

He began busking on the street and playing neighborhood theaters and flea markets. From these performances, he quickly established a following. Benise came up with an act that married Latin rhythms to a circus atmosphere. He fuses world music (specifically, strongly Latin-flavored styles such as flamenco, salsa, tango, and samba underscored by African tribal rhythms) with rock, to create a sound that appeals to mainstream music fans and aficionados of world music.

The mixture caught the attention of the Public Broadcasting Service (PBS) and led to his 2006-2007 Nights of Fire! production that has aired on many PBS-affiliated stations, and won an Emmy Award. The show is a blend of theater and music, drawing from Spanish flamenco, Argentine tango, and Brazilian samba.

To date, Benise has produced 13 CDs (12 studio, one live) and 5 DVDs. He owns an independent record label, Spanish Guitar Entertainment.

== History ==
Roni Benise comes from a small farm 30 miles west of Grand Island, Nebraska. The self-taught guitarist started playing at age eleven, and got into local bands as a teenager. His parents thought he would join the family business but he wanted to pursue a rock career. He felt limited by his home's remote location, so he moved to Southern California in 1999. He cleaned swimming pools, and played guitar in rock bands at night. In an interview with Chuy Varela of the San Francisco Chronicle, Benise counts Jimmy Page, Jimi Hendrix, and "all the greats" among his influences.

Benise stumbled into Spanish guitar listening to the radio, and something clicked. "I think there are times in everyone's life when everything changes," he said. "Hearing the Spanish guitar in the car was that moment for me because the sound takes you away to an exotic place, and it was a perfect fit, especially when I was in this crossroads of my life." He got a nylon string guitar and started relearning the instrument. Benise retired his electric guitar to focus exclusively on his new instrument. He meshed his rock background and the Spanish guitar in a combination he calls "rockmenco", pouring out "intoxicating" Spanish flamenco-inspired guitar riffs with the intensity of a rock player.

He was turned down by almost every club in the city. ("Spanish guitar? Forget about it!" was the reaction Benise recalls hearing). So Benise formed a street group. They played around 225 shows a year, anywhere there were tourists, performing original songs and selling CDs. Soon, he and his band were getting noticed by clubs. "Before I knew it, people would line up on the street for our performances," Benise said. "It's been seven years since I started with the Spanish guitar. We started playing for tourists, then we began renting out theaters and building on that momentum." Benise began promoting his own concerts at 2,000-seat theaters throughout the area. He subtitled his all-instrumental show, Love, Music, and Life!.

== Nights of Fire! ==
Benise's initial success producing Latin-flavored entertainment led to the Nights of Fire! production, which has been broadcast on PBS nationwide. It was taped at the Spanish Colonial Revival style Arlington Theatre in Santa Barbara, California. The idea for Nights of Fire! blossomed out from his self-produced concerts, which he called Viva Spanish Nights. Featuring circus performers, samba dancers, and African drummers, the show filled 2,000-seat venues.

"Offers came in from record companies, but Benise turned them down, believing he would have to compromise his music or downsize his show. He finally found management he liked in Doc McGhee, who discovered Bon Jovi, Kiss, Mötley Crüe, and others.

Observing how PBS introduced mass audiences to Yanni, Sarah Brightman, and Riverdance, he decided that hooking up with the network was logical. He created the equivalent of a stage musical, with instrumental guitar pieces that allow the rhythms and melodies to create a wordless story line."

The mixture of material in Nights of Fire! includes Brazilian samba, Cuban salsa, Spanish flamenco, Argentine tango, even African tribal chants and drums. The production received an Emmy for its costumes. Benise says, "I appreciate music from all over the world and I believe that feeling has allowed me to embrace them all, to incorporate them into the songs that I write, the music we sing, the shows we perform. When people ask what it is, I tell them it’s a combination of blues, jazz, salsa, rock and more, but in a hipper style." Some describe Roni Benise's Nights of Fire! as a cross between Latin Riverdance and Cirque du Soleil. The 40-person cast includes exotic drums, Gypsy violin, flamenco dancers, circus performers, Brazilian samba dancers and percussionists, African tribal drummers, horns and lighting technicians. The music also fits into new-age and smooth jazz radio formats.

=== Nights of Fire! musicians ===
- Karen Briggs
- Gilberto Gonzalez
- Mychal Lomas
- Al Velasquez
- Lucine Fyelon violin
- C.G. Ryche
- Jim Sitterly
- Yussi

== Discography ==
=== Studio albums ===
- Taboo (2000)
- Angels: The Holiday Album (2000)
- Spanish Nights (2001)
- Romance & Passion / Europa (2001)
- Mediterranea (2002)
- Carnaval / Brazil (2003)
- Nights of Fire! (2005)
- Cuba (2007)
- Sentimento (2008)
- The Spanish Guitar (2010)
- White Christmas (2010)
- Live From China! (2012)
- Barcelona Lounge No. 1 (2013) (Benise & Arkenstone)
- Strings of Passion: A 10 Year Mosaic (2015)

=== Concert albums ===
- Benise Live (2004)

=== Compilations ===
- Romanza (2008)
- Sabrosa: Romantic Spanish Guitar (2009)

=== Live concert films ===
- Viva Spanish Nights: Benise Live in Concert (2003); DVD, Blu-ray
- Nights of Fire! (2006); DVD, Blu-ray Won an Emmy Award for Outstanding Costumes for a Variety or Music Program
- The Spanish Guitar (2010); DVD, Blu-ray
- Live From China! (2012); DVD
- Strings of Passion: A 10 Year Mosaic (2015); DVD
- Fuego!: Spirit of Spain (2018); DVD

== Other compilation appearances ==
- Gypsy Spice: Best Of New Flamenco (2009) (Baja Records)

== See also ==
- David Arkenstone
- Flamenco rumba
- List of flamenco guitarists
- New Flamenco
