= Charlee Brooks =

American vocalist (born 1988)

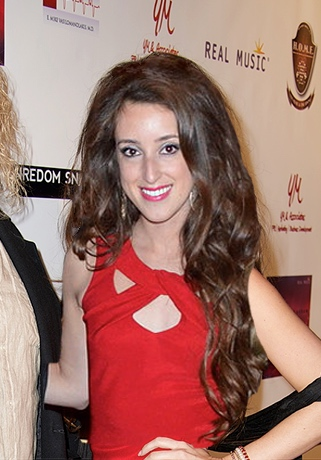
- Brooks at Grammy Winner Omar Akram's CD Release Party.

Background information
- Born: Charlee Nicole Brooks; July 24, 1988 (age 38); New Brighton, Pennsylvania, United States
- Genres: New Age, Pop, Neoclassical
- Occupations: Vocalist, composer, engineer
- Instruments: Vocals, Piano, Guitar
- Labels: Sony/RED, Spring Hill Music
- Website: www.charleebrooksmusic.com

Charlee Brooks (born July 24, 1988) is an American vocalist, composer, and audio engineer. Born and raised in New Brighton, Pennsylvania, she began her first works in production as a second engineer on the 2010 World of Warcraft: Cataclysm expansion. That same year she made her first television appearance as a performer during the live broadcast of BlizzCon 2010 on Direct TV. She continued her work in production / creative design through 2012 where she contributed to projects for Crystal Cruises, Dr. Daniel Amen, HGTV, Arbonne International and many others.

Brooks debuted her musical artistry in 2013 with her first official release "Lovéren" through Sony/MRI, a new age/neoclassical album, and collaboration with multi-grammy nominated artist/composer David Arkenstone. Lovéren debuted at #1 on the Zone Music Reporter charts in 2013, and remained on the charts for over 8 months. Lovéren was also included on the pre-nomination ballot for the 2013 Grammy Awards in two categories, Best Engineered Non-Classical, and Best New Age Album. Later that year, her work on Lovéren received two nominations from Zone Music Reporter for Best Vocal Album, and Album of the Year.

In 2014, Brooks made her next television appearance as a featured performer in "David Arkenstone's Symphonic Adventure" a public broadcast special that continues to run on select stations across the US. The show featured Brooks' work on Lovéren and other renowned musicians such as Karen Briggs, Eric Rigler, and the performers of Cirque de la Symphonie. Brooks' continued her musical work during the production of Symphonic Adventure and has since been featured on the album entitled "Celtic Garden" released by Spring Hill Music in 2014. Her next album "Inamorata" is scheduled for a February 2015 release.

== Early life and career ==
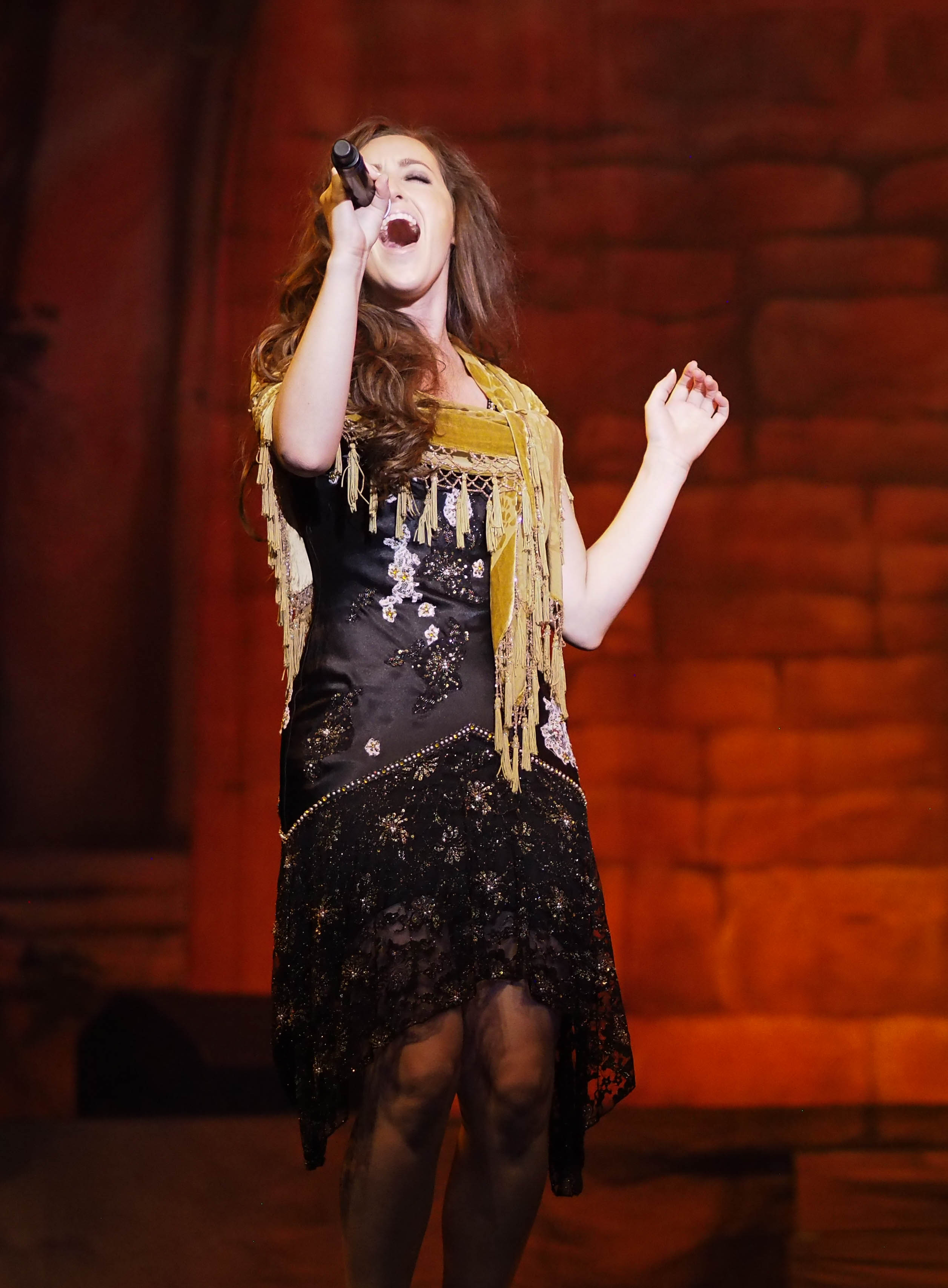
Brooks performs with Benise for the return of his Emmy Award Winning Tour.

Charlee Nicole Brooks was born in New Brighton, Pennsylvania, on July 24, 1988, to Stephen Bruce Jurich, and Lisa Ann Jurich. Heavily involved in the arts since the age of 2, she studied music, theater, and dance at The Henry Mancini School of Performing Arts in Industry, PA. Brooks also studied at other facilities such as the Civic Light Opera of Pittsburgh, the Sewickley School of Performing Arts, and Paula Scriva's dance academy. When Brooks was younger she had many musical influences in her own home. Her father was a musician, and guitar player, who led the Praise and Worship services at their local church. Her grandfather, also a musician, alongside many other family members who participated in the Tamburitzan orchestras (a preservation of Croatian folk music). Her grandfather was a skilled luthier, who she observed as a young child crafting various stringed instruments right there in his own home. Many elements of her childhood led her to the pursuit of a career in entertainment.

After high school, Brooks went on to study Business and Economics at Penn State University. She has attended various other schools as a continuation of her education and coursework. Ultimately deciding to pursue her career further, she relocated to Southern California in 2008. One year later, at the age of 19, she formed her first company, LOE Music, LLC, and began to take on production work as a freelance engineer. She obtained her first significant line of work when she was brought on to the creative team at Pacific Coast Presentations in Newport Beach, California. Here she was presented with many opportunities that eventually launched her into her current career as a musical artist. While working here as an engineer on a project for Blizzard Entertainment, she met composer David Arkenstone who at the time was providing his music services to the company. This led to their first collaboration and many others.

== Discography ==
=== Albums released as an artist ===
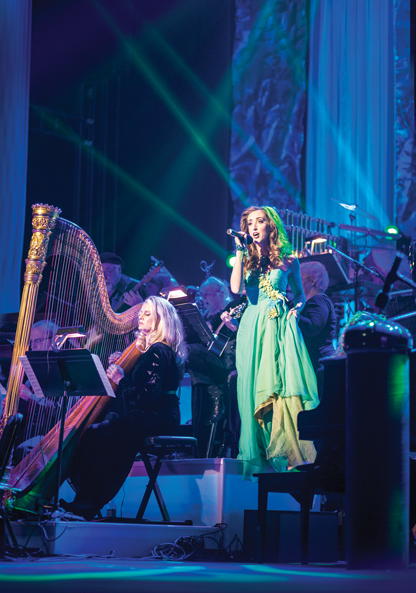
Charlee performs live on KCET LA.

- Lovéren (2013)
- Celtic Garden (2014)
- Inamorata (2015)
- Winter Fantasy (2016)

=== Albums released with engineering credits ===
- Lovéren - Composer, Engineer, Guitar, Kalimba, Mixing, Primary Artist, Producer, Vocals
- Celtic Garden - featured artist, Mixing, Primary Artist, Vocals
- Last Time Was the Last Time - Mastering
- Union Road - Mixing, Vocals
- A Curious Children's Album - mixing
