= Spirit Wind =

Studio album by David Arkenstone
- Released: March 11, 1997
- Recorded: ?
- Genre: New age
- Length: 51:54
- Label: Windham Hill
- Producer: David Arkenstone

David Arkenstone chronology
Convergence (1996)	Spirit Wind (1997)	Enchantment: A Magical Christmas (1997)

Professional ratings
Review scores
Source	Rating
Allmusic	3/5 stars

Spirit Wind is an album by multi-instrumentalist David Arkenstone, released in 1997. Most of the music was written for a film called Legend of the Spirit Dog. A Native American feel is present on several tracks.

== Track listing ==
All tracks composed by David Arkenstone:

1. "The Ancient Road" – 4:21
2. "Destiny" – 2:42
3. "Companions" – 3:34
4. "Magic" – 1:44
5. "Night Visions" – 3:37
6. "Continue to Be" – 3:27
7. "The Wolf Hunt" – 1:29
8. "Northern Song" – 4:01
9. "Wind in the Trees" – 3:11
10. "A Special Place" – 2:35
11. "River Crossing" – 3:46
12. "Legends" – 2:36
13. "Changes" – 2:33
14. "Spirit Wind" – 4:59
15. "The Long Way Home" – 6:50

== Personnel ==
- David Arkenstone – guitars, piano, mandolin, cittern, percussion, bass, flute, keyboards, sound design
- Don Markese – Watershed flutes, C flute, alto flute, piccolo, clarinet, Soprano saxophone, pennywhistle, ocarina
- Eric Segnitz – string arrangements
- Douglas Spotted Eagle – Native American flute on tracks 2, 6, 7, 13, and 15
