= Robot Jox =

1990 film by Stuart Gordon

- Theatrical release poster
- Directed by: Stuart Gordon
- Screenplay by: Joe Haldeman
- Story by: Stuart Gordon
- Produced by: Albert Band
- Starring: Gary Graham; Anne-Marie Johnson; Paul Koslo; Robert Sampson; Danny Kamekona; Hilary Mason; Michael Alldredge
- Cinematography: Mac Ahlberg
- Edited by: Ted Nicolaou; Lori Ball
- Music by: Frédéric Talgorn
- Production company: Empire Pictures
- Distributed by: Triumph Releasing Corporation
- Release date: November 21, 1990
- Running time: 85 minutes
- Country: United States
- Language: English
- Budget: $6.5–10 million (Note: Although most official reports place the budget for the film at $10 million, director Stuart Gordon has stated that "the actual budget ended up being about $6.5 million.")
- Box office: $1.3 million

Robot Jox is a 1990 American post-apocalyptic mecha science-fiction film directed by Stuart Gordon and starring Gary Graham, Anne-Marie Johnson and Paul Koslo. Co-written by science-fiction author Joe Haldeman, the film's plot follows Achilles, one of the "robot jox" who pilot giant machines that fight international battles to settle territorial disputes in a dystopian, post-apocalyptic world.

After producer Charles Band approved Gordon's initial concept, the director approached Haldeman to write the script. Gordon and Haldeman clashed frequently over the film's tone and intended audience. Principal photography finished in Rome in 1987, but the bankruptcy of Band's Empire Pictures delayed the film's release in theaters until 1990. It earned $1,272,977 in domestic theatrical gross, failing to return its production cost. Robot Jox received negative critical response and little audience attention upon its first theatrical run. The film has been released on various home video formats, most recently on Blu-ray in July 2015.

== Plot ==
Fifty years after a nuclear holocaust, mankind is decimated and the surviving nations—the American western-influenced Market and the Soviet-Russian-influenced Confederation—have agreed to outlaw traditional open war. In their place, disputes are settled with gladiator-style matches between giant robots operated by pilots called "robot jox" who are contracted to fight ten matches. The Confederation champion is Alexander, who has killed his last nine opponents thanks in part to a spy in the Market leaking information to the Confederation. The Market's champion, Achilles has won nine fights and will fight his final match against Alexander for the territory of Alaska. Achilles is supported by robot designer "Doc" Matsumoto and strategist Tex Conway, the only jox to win all ten of his contract fights.

As Achilles gets the upper hand in the match, Alexander launches a rocket fist at him. The projectile goes out of control and heads toward the bleachers. Achilles intercepts the projectile but his robot takes the full force of the impact and is knocked into the crowd, killing over 300 people. The referees declare the match a draw and order a rematch, but Achilles, shaken by what happened, declares this was his contractual tenth match and announces his retirement. He goes to live with his brother Philip and his family, and finds he is publicly branded a traitor and a coward. Meanwhile, a new jox is chosen to face Alexander, a genetically engineered "gen jox" named Athena, who is the first female jox. Worried for Athena and attracted to her, Achilles returns to the Market and agrees to fight Alexander again, infuriating Athena.

As Achilles' robot is rebuilt, Matsumoto refuses to divulge any knowledge of its new weapons so it cannot be leaked by the spy, and Conway confides in Achilles he believes Matsumoto is the spy. Conway confronts Matsumoto in his office. Matsumoto reveals he has analyzed Conway's final fight and deduced that the "lucky" laser hit Conway claims allowed him to defeat a clearly superior opponent was in fact deliberately aimed; Matsumoto accuses Conway of being a Confederation agent. Conway confesses and shoots Matsumoto, who secretly records the deed as part of the mission briefing. Conway informs the Market leadership that Matsumoto was the spy. On the day of the fight Athena drugs Achilles and steals his jox suit to commandeer the robot. Unable to stop the fight once she takes the field, the Market decides to support her. While watching Matsumoto's briefing on the robot's new weaponry, the footage of Conway killing Matsumoto is played and Conway jumps down the robot's elevator shaft to his death.

Alexander takes the field against Athena. Athena takes the early advantage, but Alexander overpowers her and incapacitates the robot. The fight is declared in Alexander's favor and referees order him to stand down. Achilles arrives on the field and takes over the robot from Athena while Alexander smashes the referee hovercraft; the two jox stand to continue the fight. Both robots take to the air and a short space battle ensues. Alexander critically damages Achilles' robot, forcing him to crash land and flee for cover to the arm of Alexander's robot Athena sliced off earlier in the fight. Achilles hotwires the arm to launch its fist at Alexander, destroying his robot. Alexander emerges from the wreckage and the two battle with poles before Achilles finally convinces Alexander a match does not have to end with the death of a jock. Alexander throws down his weapon, and they salute each other with the jox's traditional "crash and burn" thumbs up (this iconic thumbs up would be referenced by Hideo Kojima in his Death Stranding Series). (Note: In 2012, Haldeman wrote that he had first heard the phrase "crash and burn" used as a greeting between motorcycle racers during a Speedweek event.)

== Cast ==
- Gary Graham as Achilles / Jim
- Anne-Marie Johnson as Athena
- Paul Koslo as Alexander
- Robert Sampson as Commissioner Jameson
- Danny Kamekona as Dr. "Doc" Matsumoto
- Hilary Mason as Professor Laplace
- Michael Alldredge as "Tex" Conway
- Jeffrey Combs as Spectator / Prole #1
- Michael Saad as Spectator / Prole #2
- Ian Patrick Williams as Phillip
- Jason Marsden as Tommy
- Carolyn Purdy-Gordon as Kate
- Thyme Lewis as Sargon
- Gary Houston as Sportscaster
- Russel Case as Hercules

== Production ==
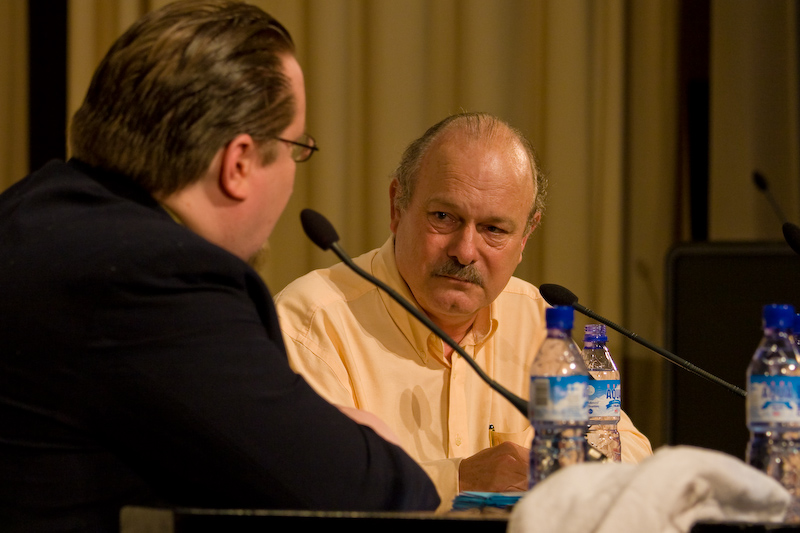
Author Joe Haldeman clashed repeatedly with director Stuart Gordon

Director Stuart Gordon stated that the initial inspiration for Robot Jox came from the Japanese Transformers toy line:

While there have been animated cartoons based on these giant robots, no one has ever attempted a live-action feature about them. It struck me that it was a natural fantasy for the big screen–and a terrific opportunity to take advantage of the special effects that are available today.

When Gordon initially approached producer Charles Band with the concept, Band said the film would be too expensive for his studio, Empire Pictures, to produce. Band changed his mind, however, and asked Gordon to create a demo reel of stop motion test footage with special effects artist David W. Allen. The footage impressed the film's potential backers, and eventually became the film's opening title sequence. Initially budgeted at $7 million, the film was to be the most expensive film Empire Pictures had ever produced.

Science-fiction author Joe Haldeman wrote the screenplay for the film and co-wrote the story with Gordon. The two met when Gordon was hired to film a four-part adaptation of Haldeman's novel The Forever War, but when funding for the project was cut, Gordon instead directed a stage adaptation of the book, which Haldeman also wrote. Two years later, Gordon asked Haldeman to work on a science fiction adaptation of the Iliad; the idea would form the basis for what eventually became Robot Jox. Haldeman claimed his and Gordon's visions for the film clashed; the former wanted a dramatic, serious science fiction film while the latter wanted a more audience-friendly, special effects-driven action film with stereotypical characters and stylized pseudo-science. In a one-and-a-half-page outline, Gordon inserted other elements into the plot, including the film's Cold War-era themes. Haldeman wanted to title the film The Mechanics, but Gordon insisted on Robojox. (Note: After Orion Pictures threatened to sue based on the title's similarity to their 1987 film RoboCop, producers changed the title to Robot Jox.) According to Haldeman:

I would try to change the science into something reasonable; Stuart would change it back to Saturday morning cartoon stuff. I tried to make believable, reasonable characters, and Stuart would insist on throwing in clichés and caricatures. It was especially annoying because it was a story about soldiers, and I was the only person around who'd ever been one.

Several times, Haldeman feared that this clash would lead to him being dropped from the project, but the film's producers sided with him during pre-production. Haldeman wrote that Gordon later recognized that the author was "writing a movie for adults that children can enjoy" while Gordon had been "directing a movie for children that adults can enjoy."

Principal photography on the film began in Rome in January 1987 and ended in April. During filming, the producers brought in Haldeman to work with the film's principal actors. Afterwards, Allen began to produce the film's special effects sequences. Ron Cobb helped design the robots for these scenes. Allen chose to film these sequences at El Mirage lake bed in San Bernardino County, California, due to its bright skies and unobstructed panoramic view; however, weather elements frequently delayed filming.

== Release ==
Although originally scheduled for release in 1989 (a novelization, written by science fiction author Robert Thurston, was published that year), the film's theatrical run was initially delayed until April 1990 due to Empire International Pictures' bankruptcy during production. After more delays, Triumph Films released the film to theaters on November 21, 1990. When it peaked in its second weekend at the 13th spot, it grossed $464,441 in 333 theaters, averaging $1,394 per theater; it eventually earned a domestic total gross of $1,272,977. Its limited run in theaters prompted science fiction writer Gardner Dozois to remark that "Robot Jox, a movie with a screenplay by Joe Haldeman, was supposedly released this year, but if it played through Philadelphia at all, it must have done so fast, because I never even saw a listing for it, let alone the movie itself."

=== Soundtrack ===
Robot Jox Original Motion Picture Soundtrack

Soundtrack album by Frédéric Talgorn
- Released: 1993
- Length: 40:19 (reissue)
- Label: Prometheus Records

Frédéric Talgorn chronology
Edge of Sanity (1989)	Robot Jox Original Motion Picture Soundtrack (1993)	Buried Alive (1990)

Frédéric Talgorn, who had previously composed the music for the 1989 horror film Edge of Sanity, wrote the orchestral film score for Robot Jox, which was performed by the Paris Philharmonic Orchestra. Since Prometheus Records reissued the soundtrack in 1993, it has received generally high acclaim. An editorial review by Filmtracks.com stated that "Talgorn's usual strong development of thematic ideas is well utilized in rather simplistic fashion in this film, perfect for the contrasting characters and their underdeveloped dimensions."

=== Home media ===
Sony Pictures Home Entertainment released the film on VHS and LaserDisc formats. (Note: The direct-to-video films Crash and Burn and Robot Wars were marketed on home video in some countries as sequels to Robot Jox, but despite some similarities and the involvement of producer Charles Band, the plots of the three films are unrelated.) In October 2005, MGM Home Entertainment released the film on DVD. Though the cover still includes the film's theatrical PG rating, the version of the film included contained violent scenes that were cut from the North American release to avoid a PG-13 rating.

The 1998 film Robo Warriors was marked in some foreign territories as Robot Jox 3: 2086 Apocalypse.

In October 2014, Shout! Factory announced that the company would release the film on Blu-ray Disc in the summer of 2015. The disc included two audio commentary tracks: one featuring director Stuart Gordon and another with special effects artists Paul Gentry, Mark Rutherford, and Paul Jesel. The disc also included various behind-the-scenes featurettes, as well as trailers and archival materials. Reviewers for Blu-ray.com and Hi-Def Digest recommended the disc for fans of the film.

On June 27, 2023, Arrow Films released their new 2k restoration from the film's original negative on Blu-Ray as part of their "Enter the Video Store: Empire of Screams" boxset.

== Reception and legacy ==
Robot Jox received little media coverage during its initial release, but the professional critics who did review it rated it poorly, noting the film's struggle to find a balance between adult and child audiences. By the time the film was released, its Cold War themes had become less relevant to United States audiences and the popularity of Transformers, which the filmmakers had intended to capitalize on, had diminished. The Sacramento Bee wrote that the film "spreads its dubious resources across the world, dealing with the already dated power-mad rivalry between America and the U.S.S.R. for domination." Haldeman was generally unsatisfied with the movie, later writing that "it's as if I'd had a child who started out well and then sustained brain damage." Academic criticism was somewhat more positive, with film scholar J. P. Telotte writing:

While a recent film like Robot Jox (1990) ... revels in exploring the technical complexities of its central conceit—nations warring vicariously through giant robots piloted by gladiator-type "jockies"—it repeatedly emphasizes how much of the human has been surrendered to the technological and concludes with its chief antagonists abandoning their mechanical mounts to live in peace. Robot Jox, though, is just one of a great many such films to depict the attractions and promises of science and technology as essentially fictions, dangerous illusions from which we eventually have to pull back as best we can if we are to retain our humanity.

=== Later response ===
Since its initial release, Robot Jox has attracted a minor cult following of devoted fans and influenced various elements of popular culture. American industrial rock band Nine Inch Nails sampled the sound of the screaming crowd from the end of Achilles' battle with Alexander in the film for their song "The Becoming" from their 1994 album The Downward Spiral. In February 2012, Cinema Studies Student Union showed the film at Innis College, Toronto as part of a "cult film triple bill", and in August, the Alamo Drafthouse Cinema locations in Houston and Austin held special midnight screenings of a 35 mm copy of the film.

Critical reception to the film has also improved. In Directory of World Cinema (2009), Alex Fitch praised Gordon's work in 2010, citing Robot Jox as an example of how Gordon "can mix satire with special effects to great aplomb." Writing for The Encyclopedia of Science Fiction in 2012, Kim Newman noted that Gordon's style gave the film "a pleasantly uncluttered comic-bookish look", while Haldeman's influences could be seen "in his distinctive blend of military-hardware expertise and anti-war attitudes".

After the trailer for Guillermo del Toro's film Pacific Rim was released in December 2012, online critics and bloggers began to revisit the film, noting the similarities between the two films. Bloomberg Businessweek writer Clarie Suddath noted that Pacific Rim was "a mash-up of the 1980s B-movie film Robojox [sic] and Godzilla on steroids". In 2014, Gordon stated that Pacific Rim was like "déjà vu", expressing that if he had done a sequel to Robot Jox, it "would have been robots fighting aliens".
