= Sketches from an American Journey =

Studio album by David Arkenstone
- Released: June 18, 2002
- Genre: New-age
- Length: 51:28
- Label: Paras Recordings
- Producer: David Arkenstone and Don Markese

David Arkenstone chronology
Visionary (2002)	Sketches from an American Journey (2002)	Spirit of Tibet: A Musical Odyssey (2002)

Professional ratings
Review scores
Source	Rating
AllMusic	3/5 stars

Sketches from an American Journey is an album by David Arkenstone, released in 2002. It is inspired by the natural landscapes of the United States. There is far less focus on synthesizers than on most other Arkenstone releases. Piano and an orchestra are featured prominently throughout the album.

The album was re-released by Domo Records in 2010.

== Track listing ==
1. "New Day" – 4:14
2. "Sunset Highway" – 4:15
3. "Places in the Heart" – 4:23
4. "Full Sail" – 4:00
5. "Pacific Rain" – 4:42
6. "Sketches of the Dream" – 5:40
7. "The Colors of Fall" – 5:06
8. "The American Journey" – 4:38
9. "Voice of a New Land" – 5:30
10. "Wild River" – 4:47
11. "Surrounded by Beauty" – 3:45
- All tracks composed by David Arkenstone

== Personnel ==
- David Arkenstone – guitar, mandolin, keyboards, bass, pennywhistle, bouzouki, percussion
- Don Markese – soprano saxophone, flute, piccolo
- Seth Osburn – piano
- Chad Watson – bass
- John Wakefield – percussion
- Ric Craig – drums
- Marc Antoine – guitar on "Sunset Highway"
- The Recording Arts Orchestra of Salt Lake City
