= Atlantis: A Symphonic Journey =

Studio album by David Arkenstone
- Released: September 7, 2004
- Genre: New age
- Length: 51:02
- Label: Narada
- Producer: David Arkenstone

David Arkenstone chronology
Caribbean Dreams (2004)	Atlantis: A Symphonic Journey (2004)	Best of David Arkenstone (2005)

Professional ratings
Review scores
Source	Rating
Allmusic	3.5/5 stars

Atlantis: A Symphonic Journey is an album by David Arkenstone, released in 2004. The album is based on the legend of the lost civilization of Atlantis. Once again Arkenstone combines elements of new age and world music with an orchestral, cinematic flair.

== Track listing ==
All tracks are written by David Arkenstone.

No.	Title	Length
1.	"The Dream of the Gods"	4:44
2.	"Tower of Light"	6:10
3.	"In the Gardens of the Citadel"	4:10
4.	"The Temple of Poseidon"	4:21
5.	"Jewel of the Sea"	3:35
6.	"Festival of the Goddess"	4:11
7.	"The Painted Sails"	5:49
8.	"Across the Great Oceans"	5:39
9.	"Fire and Water"	5:26
10.	"Below the Ocean – The Spirit of Atlantis"	6:57
Total length:		51:02

== Personnel ==
- David Arkenstone – guitar, mandolin, drums, percussion, flutes, fretless bass, piano, keyboards
- Seth Osburn – conductor, percussion
- Harry Scorzo, Terry Glenny, J'anna Jacoby, Tom Vos, Lisa Dondlinger, Erlinda Romero – violin
- Alexis Carreon, Alma Fernandez, Briana Bandy – viola
- Peggy Baldwin, Ira Glansbeek – cello
- Cathy Larson – flutes
- David Kossoff – oboe, English horn
- Kourosh Zolani – santour
- John Wakefield – percussion
- Miriam Stockley – vocal performance and arrangements on tracks 2 and 10
