= Island (David Arkenstone album) =

Studio album by David Arkenstone with Andrew White
- Released: 1989
- Recorded: March–October 1988
- Genre: New age
- Length: 45:11
- Label: Narada
- Producer: Eric Lindert and David Arkenstone

David Arkenstone with Andrew White chronology
Valley in the Clouds (1987)	Island (1989)	Citizen of Time (1990)

Professional ratings
Review scores
Source	Rating
Allmusic	2/5 stars

Island is an instrumental album by David Arkenstone with Andrew White, released in 1989. It is a departure from Arkenstone's mostly electronic debut album Valley in the Clouds.

== Track listing ==
1. "Nantucket" – 3:14
2. "Ballet" – 4:08
3. "The Island Road" – 3:28
4. "Desert Ride" – 4:10
5. "Along the Shoreline" – 3:26
6. "Caravan" – 3:46
7. "Hindu Holiday" – 4:05
8. "Passage" – 4:44
9. "Nullarbor" – 4:32
10. "The Palace" – 4:32
11. "Carnation Lily Lily Rose" – 4:46
- Tracks 2, 3, 6, 8, and 10 composed by David Arkenstone. Tracks 1, 4, 7, and 9 composed by David Arkenstone and Andrew White. Tracks 5 and 11 composed by Andrew White.

Notes

- "The Island Road" and "Caravan" is most well known around the web as being one of the background tracks used in the "Chuck E. Cheese's University" training videotapes from 1991.

== Personnel ==
- David Arkenstone – keyboards, Korg M1, grand piano, guitar, flute, pennywhistle
- Andrew White – acoustic guitar, bass on "Along the Shoreline," keyboards
- Daniel Chase – drums, percussion
- Bruce Bowers – violin
- Roger Fiets – bass, fretless bass
- John Seydewitz – percussion
- Jay Leslie – flute, soprano saxophone
- Nancy Rumbel – oboe, English horn
