= Citizen of the World (David Arkenstone album) =

Studio album by David Arkenstone
- Released: 1999
- Recorded: March–May 1999
- Genre: New age
- Length: 56:30
- Label: Windham Hill
- Producer: David Arkenstone

David Arkenstone chronology
The Celtic Book of Days (1998)	Citizen of the World (1999)	Caravan of Light (2000)

Professional ratings
Review scores
Source	Rating
Allmusic	2.5/5 stars

Citizen of the World is an album by David Arkenstone, released in 1999. It is the first in which he purposely makes a tour of world music forms, mixing them with jazz, rock, and New Age elements.

== Track listing ==
1. "Forest Runners" – 5:55
2. "Desert Crossing" – 5:21
3. "Moonflower" – 5:08
4. "The Gypsy Camp" – 4:20
5. "Safe Passage" – 4:57
6. "Ceremony" – 6:24
7. "Land of the Tiger" – 6:21
8. "Carried Away Across the Sea" – 4:36
9. "Temple of the Pharaoh" – 6:06
10. "Into the Dreamtime" – 7:15
- All tracks composed by David Arkenstone
- Arranged by Don Markese and David Arkenstone
- Recorded and mixed by Mike Aarvold and David Arkenstone

== Personnel ==
- David Arkenstone – keyboards, bouzouki, guitar, flutes, bass, percussion, sound design
- Don Markese – flute, alto flute, bass flute, pan flute, pennywhistle, piccolo, clarinet, soprano sax
- Sid Page, Joel Derouin – violin
- Danny Chase – drums
- Samite Mulondo – kalimba on "Safe Passage"
