= Paul Ganus =

American actor

- Born: Paul Edward Ganus; July 28, 1961 (age 65); Midland, Michigan, United States
- Other name: Paul E. Ganus
- Education: Alma College
- Occupation: Actor
- Spouse: Ellen Bradley (1991–present)

Paul Edward Ganus (born July 28, 1961) is an American actor. He is a native of Midland, Michigan.

== Career ==
Ganus has guest starred on numerous television series, including Murder, She Wrote, Dallas, The Fresh Prince of Bel-Air, Las Vegas, Alias, Cold Case, House M.D., Veronica Mars, Family Guy, The O.C., CSI: Crime Scene Investigation, Nip/Tuck and Heroes.

He has also had small roles in such feature films as Lethal Weapon 3, The Mask of Zorro and Rumor Has It....

Ganus appeared in a recurring role of "Andy Johnson" on the soap opera The Bold and the Beautiful.

He also voiced several NPCs in the video game The Elder Scrolls V: Skyrim, namely Eorlund Gray-Mane and many Hold Guards.

== Sources ==
- Ritter, Victoria (October 12, 2017). "Midland native stars in "Battle of the Sexes"". Midland Daily News. Midland, Michigan.
