= Robot Wars (film) =

- Theatrical release poster
- Directed by: Albert Band
- Written by: Jackson Barr
- Story by: Charles Band
- Produced by: Albert Band
- Starring: Don Michael Paul; Barbara Crampton; James Staley; Lisa Rinna
- Music by: David Arkenstone
- Production companies: Full Moon Entertainment; Paramount Pictures
- Distributed by: Paramount Pictures
- Release date: April 28, 1993
- Running time: 72 min
- Country: United States
- Language: English

Robot Wars is a 1993 American cyberpunk film directed by Albert Band and written by Charles Band and Jackson Barr. It tells the story of a hotshot mech pilot in a post-apocalyptic 2041 who must stop mech hijackers from provoking global war. It is sometimes marketed as a sequel to Robot Jox, but they are unrelated.

== Plot ==
The film is set in an apocalyptic future where large swaths of North America have been turned into inhospitable desert and the United States has been assimilated into a Western bloc called the North Hemi. In order to survive North Hemi has begun plans to manufacture "mini-megs" called Mega-Robotic Assault System-2 (MRAS-2), miniature versions of giant "mega-robots" that resemble mechanized scorpions. The only working MRAS-2 is being used by Captain Drake and copilot Stumpy to conduct tours and deliver supplies. During one such expedition MRAS-2 is attacked by raiders and Drake is ordered by his boss Rooney to show off the unit's offensive capabilities to General Wa-Lee and his aide Chou-Sing, visiting dignitaries from the Eastern Alliance sent to negotiate the purchase of the mini-meg series. The battle sparks the ire of archaeologist Leda Fanning, who was traveling in the MRAS-2 in order to meet with her journalist friend Annie.

Leda and Annie meet up to discuss suspicious activity surrounding Crystal Vista, an abandoned yet perfectly preserved 20th century town. Their investigations show evidence that the town is part of a modern cover-up and that an underground tunnel may contain an old MEGA-1 robot, which was supposedly dismantled. Meanwhile, Drake decides to give up piloting the MRAS-2 in order to participate in a special op against the raiders. He warns Rooney not to do further tours as the raiders will be targeting the unit, but Rooney does not listen and hires a replacement pilot, Boles, as well as teaching Wa-Lee how to operate the MRAS-2. This last part frustrates Drake, who warns Rooney that the Eastern Alliance is not to be trusted. On the next trip out Leda and Annie travel to Crystal Vista where they discover the micron transponders of the MEGA-1, prompting Leda to remain behind while Annie returns on the MRAS-2. Leda is then captured by raiders.

Wa-Lee and his officers turn on the North Hemi security with the help of the raiders, killing the security team and Boles, after which they take the remaining passengers hostage in the MRAS-2 cabin. They then set out to use the MRAS-2 to destroy strategic targets. Drake and Stumpy discover an intact MEGA-1 robot and reactivate it using Stumpy's expertise. They also free Leda and kill Chou-Sing, prompting Wa-Lee to pursue the MEGA-1 team. The two robots meet in the desert and begin fighting. Drake removes the MRAS-2's cabin, saving the passengers, and eventually manages to severely damage MRAS-2 and subdue the General. The film ends happily as Drake and Leda admit their attraction to each other.

== Cast ==
- Don Michael Paul as Captain Marion Drake
- Barbara Crampton as Dr. Leda Fanning
- James Staley as "Stumpy"
- Lisa Rinna as Annie
- Danny Kamekona as General Wa-Lee
- Yuji Okumoto as Chou-Sing
- J. Downing as Lieutenant Plunkett
- Peter Haskell as Chief Rooney
- Sam Scarber as Lieutenant Pritchard
- Steve Eastin as Captain Boles
- Burke Byrnes as Technician

== Production ==
Initially Albert Band was going to co-direct the film with his son Charles on alternating days much like they had done on Doctor Mordrid, but due to Charles' busy schedule overseeing other Full Moon Features Albert ended up being the sole director.

=== Soundtrack ===
The soundtrack for the film was composed by David Arkenstone and was later released on CD through Moonstone Records in 1993.

No.	Title	Writer(s)	Length
1.	"Main Titles"	David Arkenstone
2.	"Desert Patrol"	David Arkenstone
3.	"Aftermath"	David Arkenstone
4.	"The Eastern Alliance"	David Arkenstone
5.	"Leda's Pictures"	David Arkenstone
6.	"Shim-Ku"	David Arkenstone
7.	"Ride to Crystal Vista"	David Arkenstone
8.	"Skirmish"	David Arkenstone
9.	"The Streets of Crystal Vista"	David Arkenstone
10.	"Underground Discover"	David Arkenstone
11.	"Nightflight"	David Arkenstone
12.	"The Search for MEGA-1"	David Arkenstone
13.	"Opening the Tomb"	David Arkenstone
14.	"Pursuit (MEGA Rises)"	David Arkenstone
15.	"The Final Battl"	David Arkenstone
16.	""Love Theme and End Titles"	David Arkenstone

== Release ==
Robot Wars was originally released on VHS by Paramount Home Video. It made its DVD debut in the 2007 box set Full Moon Classics: Volume Two. The film was also featured in the limited edition box set Full Moon Features: The Archive Collection, a 20th anniversary collection which featured 18 of Full Moon's most popular films. The film was released on DVD again by Shout! Factory on June 14, 2011, as a double feature DVD with Crash and Burn. The film was released on Blu-ray by Full Moon Features on December 15, 2017. The film was occasionally marketed in some countries as a sequel to Robot Jox, but is unrelated.

After Santo in the Treasure of Dracula, Robot Wars appeared as the second episode of the thirteenth season of Mystery Science Theater 3000.
