= Diane Arkenstone =

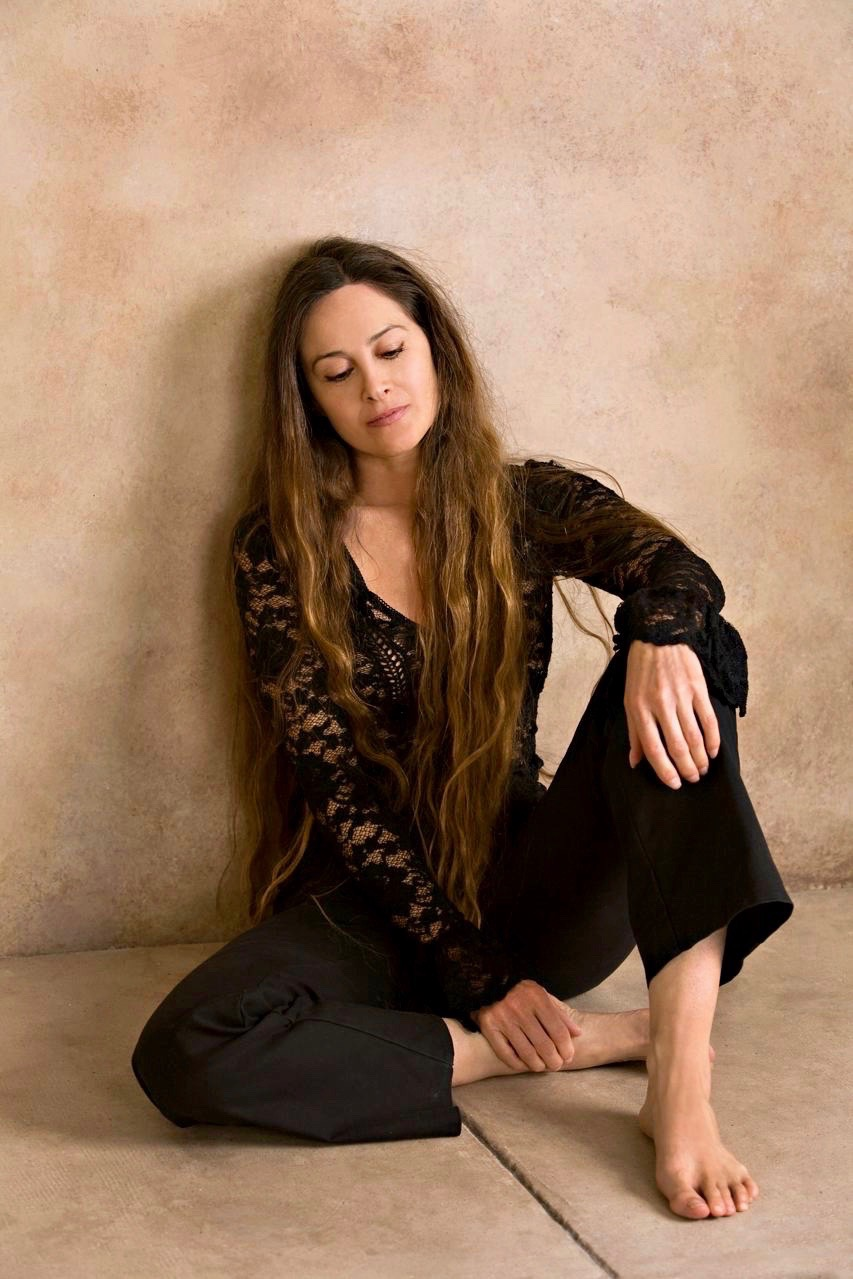

Background information
- Born: California, U.S.
- Genres: Ambient, New-age, World music, Celtic, Americana
- Occupations: Singer, composer, multi-instrumentalist
- Instruments: Guitar, keyboard, wood flutes, synthesizers, dulcimer, percussion, metal drum, kalimba, keyboard
- Label: Neo Pacifica Recordings
- Website: www.dianearkenstone.com

Diane Arkenstone is a New-age singer/songwriter and multi-instrumentalist. She is an opera singer and plays multiple instruments including guitar, keyboard, wood flutes, dulcimer, synthesizers, percussion, metal drum, and kalimbas.

Her discography contains over 55 albums spanning a variety of genres. Throughout her career, she has also collaborated creatively as part of the duo, Enaid & Einalem, and with fellow new-age musician, and ex-husband, David Arkenstone, as well as producer Derek Nakamoto.

She's also released numerous projects and collaborations through her self-owned label, Neo Pacifica Recordings, including projects under the names Ah Nee Mah and Enaid, and collaborations like Earth Trybe and Marquis Ensemble.

== About ==
Diane grew up in California on a working cattle ranch. She wrote her first song at the age of three and started playing guitar at the age of seven.

Since childhood, she has had multiple heart surgeries. In 2004 she was an official spokesperson for the American Heart Association.

== Career ==
A singer, songwriter, and multi-instrumentalist, Diane trained as an opera singer, and has enjoyed experimenting with a variety of genres throughout her career.

She plays multiple instruments including guitar, keyboard, wood flutes, dulcimer, synthesizers, percussion, metal drum, and kalimbas.

She has sold over two million units worldwide via Neo Pacifica Recordings, the independent label she launched in the late 1990s.

Her albums The Healing Heart and Avalon: Between Earth and Sky reached #1 on the Amazon New Age charts for physical product, and her songs are regularly featured on Amazon playlists including "Great New Age Music", "Spa Day", "New Age for Meditation", and many more.

Arkenstone's album Jewel in the Sun debuted at number 16 on Billboard's New Age charts when it was released in 2002, and peaked at number 11.

Her first album, Celtic Nights, sold over 500,000 copies and was released under her Celtic alias, Enaid, which is Diane spelled backwards and means life/soul in old Celtic/Irish.

Her albums have been sold in the majority of National Parks under her Native American band name, Ah Nee Mah.

Her albums have also been sold in museums and resorts across the US such as the Smithsonian, Shed Museum, Hearst Castle, and Disneyland. Her music was also used in the King Tut World Tour and played overhead in Las Vegas on Freemont Street.

Her music has been featured during the Sydney Olympics, and on networks including Animal Planet, Discovery Channel, Hallmark, NBC, CBS, and Indie and PBS films, My Child, Mother’s of War, Joan of Arc, and Written on the Landscape: Mysteries Beyond Chaco Canyon.

In 2005, The Best of Diane Arkenstone was ranked No. 1 on Zone Music Reporter's Top 100 Airplay Chart, out of 2800 recordings reported that year.

Diane's voice is featured on the soundtrack for the 2002 game Heroes of Might and Magic IV, including the songs "A Wise Tale" and "Hope" (among many others) of the game's soundtrack. While her name is not in the credits of the game, her influence of classical music is noticeable throughout the soundtrack.

Her prolific discography and collaborations have resulted in over 55 albums spanning a variety of genres.

Throughout her career she has also collaborated creatively as part of the duo, Enaid & Einalem, and with like-minded musician David Arkenstone.

In addition to releasing her own music, she's released numerous projects and collaborations through her label, including projects under the names, Ah Nee Mah and Enaid, and collaborations like Earth Trybe and Marquis Ensemble.

Her most recent recordings include The Healing Heart, released in 2021, Avalon: Between Earth and Sky, with David Arkenstone, released in 2022, and World Calling, released in 2023.

Her album, Aquaria II - Ascension, reflects humanity's evolution from the Piscean Age of water, to the Aquarian Age of air, and the shift to more awareness and nurturing energy.

=== Collaborations ===
Diane has collaborated with

- David Arkenstone
- Producer Derek Nakamoto

=== Press ===
Diane has garnered numerous press accolades throughout her career.

Jukebox Time affirmed Diane's "authentic artistic caliber," and her "enigmatic yet scintillating contemporary vibe" on the album, Light Of Varying Energies.

American Songwriter notes on her 2020 vocal track "Ions": "A sultry and slinky come hither, Arkenstone purrs and sighs to a slow, jazzy rhythm, writhing in coquettish charm."

=== Tour ===
- Headlined with David Arkenstone at Symphony Hall in Utah
- The Teatro Metropólitan in Mexico City
- National Parks Tour across the US
- Chautauqua Theatre in Boulder, CO

== Awards and Accolades ==
- 2022 One World Music Radio Awards, Best New Age Album + Best New Age Single nominations
- 2023 One World Music Radio Awards Lifetime Achievement Award Nomination
- 2005, The Best of Diane Arkenstone was ranked No. 1 on Zone Music Reporter's Top 100 Airplay Chart, out of 2800 recordings reported that year.

== Discography ==
=== Diane Arkenstone ===
Album	Release date	Label
Celtic Passage	2000	Blue Line Music
Healing: Mind, Body, Spirit (The Wellness Series)	2000	NorthSound Music
The Healing Spirit	2001	Neo Pacifica Recordings
Aquaria: A Liquid Blue Trancescape	2001	Neo Pacifica Recordings
Jewel in the Sun	2002	Neo Pacifica Recordings
The Best of Diane Arkenstone	2005	Neo Pacifica Recordings / EverSound
Stories	2005	Neo Pacifica Recordings
Christmas Healing, Vol. 1	2006	Neo Pacifica Recordings / Prima Vista Records
Christmas Healing, Vol. 2	2006	Neo Pacifica Recordings / Prima Vista Records
Christmas Healing, Vol. 3	2006	Neo Pacifica Recordings / Prima Vista Records
This Sacred Land	2009	Neo Pacifica Recordings / EverSound
The Best of David and Diane Arkenstone	2010	Neo Pacifica Recordings
Union Road	2013	Neo Pacifica Recordings
Soul Nektar	2014	Neo Pacifica Recordings
A Beautiful Christmas	2014	Neo Pacifica Recordings
Sacred Nation	2014	Neo Pacifica Recordings
Soul Nektar 2	2015	Neo Pacifica Recordings
Heart of the Vineyard	2018	Neo Pacifica Recordings
Beyond the Golden Sea	2021	Neo Pacifica Recordings
The Healing Heart	2021	Neo Pacifica Recordings
Avalon, Between Earth and Sky	2022	Neo Pacifica Recordings
Cool Waters of Life	2022	Neo Pacifica Recordings
Light of Varying Energies, L.O.V.E.	2022	Neo Pacifica Recordings
Rising	2023	Neo Pacifica Recordings
World Calling	2023	Neo Pacifica Recordings
Ascension	2023	Neo Pacifica Recordings
Echoes of the Past Float Away	2023	Neo Pacifica Recordings
She Calls	2023	Neo Pacifica Recordings
Myth is Magic	2024	Neo Pacifica Recordings
Aquaria ll Ascension	2024	Neo Pacifica Recordings
The Glass Ceiling is Now the Sky	2024	Neo Pacifica Recordings
The Essential Diane Arkenstone	2024	Neo Pacifica Recordings / EverSound
When I Fall	2024	Neo Pacifica Recordings
Meditation 1	2024	Neo Pacifica Recordings
Written on the Landscape: Mysteries Beyond Chaco Canyon	2024	PBS Film
Turquoise Sky	2025	Neo Pacifica Recordings
Meditation 2	2025	Neo Pacifica Recordings
Meditation 3	2025	Neo Pacifica Recordings
Om Shanti	2025	Neo Pacifica Recordings
Dive Into Me	2025	Neo Pacifica Recordings
Fly Into the Wind	2025	Neo Pacifica Recordings
Meditations and Birdsongs	2025	Neo Pacifica Recordings
Starlight on Fallen Snow	2025	Neo Pacifica Recordings
'The Robe of Rainbow Feathers', a children's book and animation	2025 & 2026	Mulamu Publishing
Ocean Serenade	2025	Neo Pacifica Recordings
The Glass Lagoon	2025	Neo Pacifica Recordings
Mirage Lover	2026	Neo Pacifica Recordings
Hotel Del Mar	2026	Neo Pacifica Recordings
Hypnotic Journeys	2026	Neo Pacifica Recordings
The Soft Gravity of Letting Go	2026	Neo Pacifica Recordings
Whispers	2026	Neo Pacifica Recordings
And Yet The Light Always Returns	2026	Neo Pacifica Recordings

She has also worked with David Arkenstone on the albums Music Inspired by Middle Earth, The Celtic Book of Days and the album Trance World from Earth Trybe. With Misha Segal and Peter Hume she worked on the 3-CD collaboration Christmas Healing.

=== Enaid and Einalem ===
Album	Release date	Label
Celtic Nights	1996	NorthSound Music
Celtic Christmas	1996	NorthSound Music
Celtic Romance	1998	NorthSound Music
Highland Christmas	1998	NorthSound Music
Celtic Yuletide	1998	NorthSound Music
Celtic Holiday	1999	NorthSound Music
Celtic Moon	2000	NorthSound Music
Celtic Journey	2000	NorthSound Music

=== Adventure Cargo ===
Album	Release date	Label
African Skies	2003	Neo Pacifica Recordings
Spirits of the Rainforest	2003	Neo Pacifica Recordings
Echoes of Egypt	2004	Neo Pacifica Recordings
Following the Equator	2006	Neo Pacifica Recordings

=== Ah Nee Mah ===
Album	Release date	Label
Ancient Voices	1999	Neo Pacifica Recordings
The Spirit of Mesa Verde	2000	Neo Pacifica Recordings
Spirit of the Canyon	2001	Neo Pacifica Recordings
Spirit of the Southwest (compilation)	2001	Neo Pacifica Recordings
The Grand Circle	2002	Neo Pacifica Recordings
Ancient Visions	2005	Neo Pacifica Recordings
Native Spirit (compilation)	2009	Neo Pacifica Recordings
Native Visions (compilation)	2013	Neo Pacifica Recordings
Sacred Nation	2014	Neo Pacifica Recordings
Carol of the Bells	2021	Neo Pacifica Recordings

=== Earth Trybe ===
Album	Release date	Label
Trance World	2001	Neo Pacifica Recordings
Rhythm of the Earth	2002	Neo Pacifica Recordings

=== Enaid ===
Album	Release date	Label
Avalon: A Celtic Legend	2001	Neo Pacifica Recordings

=== The Marquis Ensemble ===
Album	Release date	Label
Reflections From the Wine Country	2001	Neo Pacifica Recordings

== See also ==
- List of ambient music artists
