= David Arkenstone =

American composer and performer

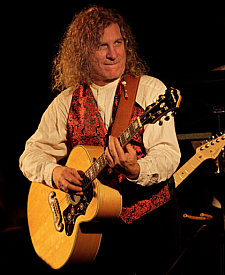
- David Arkenstone

Background information
- Born: July 1, 1952 (age 74); Chicago, Illinois, U.S.
- Genres: New-age, electronic, ambient, celtic, game music
- Occupations: Musician, composer
- Instruments: Keyboards, guitar
- Years active: 1987–present
- Labels: QDV, Windham Hill, Narada
- Website: www.davidarkenstone.com

David Arkenstone (born July 1, 1952) is an American composer and performer. His music is primarily instrumental, with occasional vocalizations. Most of Arkenstone's music falls into the new age category; however, he also worked in other genres, including even a heavy metal soundtrack for Emperor: Battle for Dune video game. His music has been described as 'soundtracks for the imagination'. Throughout his career, Arkenstone released over 50 albums and composed music for video games, including World of Warcraft, and for television, including NBC's Kentucky Derby. Arkenstone has been nominated for Grammy Awards five times.

== Biography ==
After moving from Chicago to California at the age of ten, he was involved in various high school bands playing guitars and keyboards, playing baseball in his spare time. He studied music in college and started a progressive rock band named after himself, but he soon discovered his own musical voice in the instrumental genre. Arkenstone was influenced by writers such as J. R. R. Tolkien and Ian Fleming, and grew up listening to bands like Emerson, Lake & Palmer, Deep Purple, and Yes, as well as listening to classical music.

Arkenstone went solo and found his own sound in New Age music. He says that has been greatly aided by technology: "Technology has produced some wonderful tools for making music. The computer allows me to fully orchestrate my pieces and really fine tune them". His music is primarily instrumental. His albums, typically fantasy themed, often come packaged with literature and art. He worked with fantasy novel writer Mercedes Lackey on a few of her albums. Arkenstone and his ex-wife Diane created their own record label called Neo Pacifica. In addition to releasing their own music on the label, they have included other bands such as Earth Trybe, Enaid, and the Marquis Ensemble.

He has also composed music for television; channels such as the History Channel, the Discovery Channel and NBC Sports include his music. He has also written music for trailers and film soundtracks, including the independent film PRISM, as well as computer game soundtracks such as World of Warcraft, Lands of Lore 2 and 3, Earth and Beyond, Emperor: Battle for Dune, and Space Siege. He also features on 20 Years of Narada Piano.

Arkenstone has earned five Grammy nominations for his work: In the Wake of the Wind in 1992, Citizen of the World in 2000, Atlantis in 2004,Fairy Dreams in 2020, and Pangaea in 2022.

Arkenstone has learned to play a variety of musical instruments, including bouzouki, mandolin, guitar, bass guitar, harp, cello, flute, electronic keyboards, piano, Turkish saz, pennywhistle, melodica, and pan pipes. He also plays drums and percussion and has performed some vocalizations on his albums.

Arkenstone is also involved in the band Troika; their sound is similar to his solo work. The band members like to remain anonymous, although the compositions are credited to Arkenstone.

His theme "The Journey Begins/Kyla's Ride" was used for the FIFA World Cup France '98 broadcastings intro by the Mexican television network Azteca.

His song "Papillon (On the Wings of the Butterfly)" was formerly used as background music in Future World at Epcot in Walt Disney World. His song "The Palace" was once used as background music in Tomorrowland at the Magic Kingdom as well. "The Palace" also used to play in Tokyo Disneyland's Tomorrowland, and another one of his songs, "Valley in the Clouds" was also used.

He signed with Domo Records and re-released the album Echoes of Light and Shadow in 2010.

Arkenstone was a member of the composing team who developed the music for Blizzard Activision's World of Warcraft videogame's Cataclysm expansion. Along with Arkenstone, the team consists of Derek Duke, Glenn Stafford, and Neal Acree.
