= Lambeg drum =

Unpitched percussion instrument

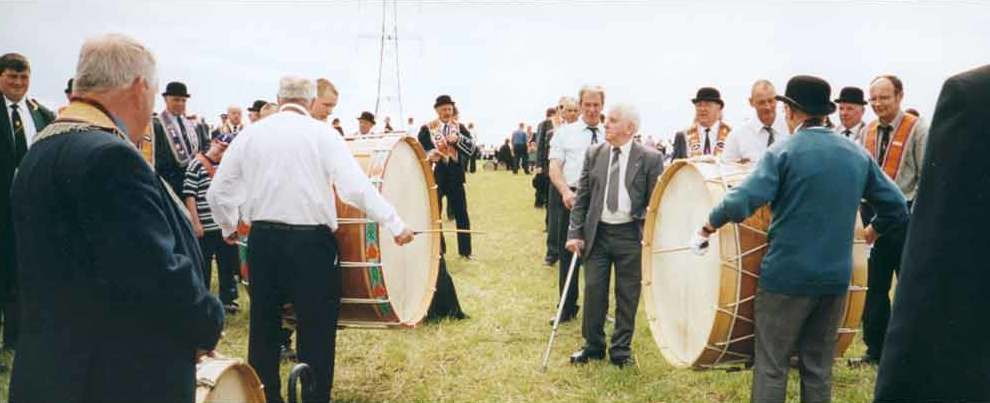
- An Orange Order Lambeg drumming contest in Coagh, County Tyrone, in 2002.

Percussion instrument
- Other names: Lambeg, tibbies, slashers, killymans
- Classification: Membranophone; Struck membranophone; Directly struck membranophones
- Hornbostel–Sachs classification: 211.2121 (single cylindrical drum with two usable membranes)

Related instruments
- bass drum, davul, gran cassa

A Lambeg drum is a large drum, beaten with curved malacca canes. It is used primarily in Northern Ireland by Unionists and the Orange Order traditionally in street parades held in the summer, particularly on and around 12 July ("The Twelfth"). The weight of the drum means that it had been replaced with smaller replicas for most parades, but the full-sized instrument has started to reappear in recent years, usually on floats. It is also used by the Ancient Order of Hibernians, having historical significance for parts of the nationalist community, as well.

== Characteristics ==
The Lambeg drum is, together with the bagpipe, one of the loudest acoustic instruments in the world, frequently reaching over 120 dB. It measures approximately 3 feet 1/4 inch (92.1 cm) in diameter and 2 feet (61 cm) deep, and weighs 35–40 pounds (16–18 kg). Usually it is carried by the drummer while marching, using a neck harness.

== Origin ==
The origin of the Lambeg is unclear. It is commonly believed to have come to Ulster with English settlers in the early-mid-17th century. Other accounts state that it came to Ireland with the Duke of Schomberg's men of the army of William of Orange during the Williamite war. Having its roots in 17th-century European military instruments, it was originally smaller. Traditionally it was accompanied by the shrill fife, a small transverse flute similar to the piccolo. Over time, the drum grew in size through emulousness between players. The drum eventually reached such a size that the fifes were drowned out. Today, the fife and the Lambeg together are the exception, rather than the norm in parades; the combination is most common in County Antrim. Most of the original Ulster fifers were of Flemish descent. A number of French Huguenots had followed William's army into Ireland and the Flemish, English and Scottish Protestant groups had united into the Orange Order.

The name comes from the village of Lambeg, County Antrim, which is situated ten miles southwest of Belfast and two miles from Lisburn. Tradition has it that it was in the Lambeg area that the instrument was first played with canes. The drum is sometimes also called "tibbies", "slashers" or "killymans".

== Construction ==
The Lambeg drum's shell is generally made of oak. Lambeg drum heads are goat skins, they are very thin and strong, and of even thickness and consistency as far as possible. A Lambeg skin will also receive "special" treatment that is a secret to each maker. Because of their qualities they are also sometimes used for smaller drums such as bodhráns.

The Lambegs are different from other large drums in the quality of their tone. The thin heads are pulled tight until the tone is bright and hard. There are no mechanical screws on the drums. The heads are held on with a wooden rim and, traditionally, linen ropes.
