= Daf =

Frame drum originating in Central Asia and the Middle East

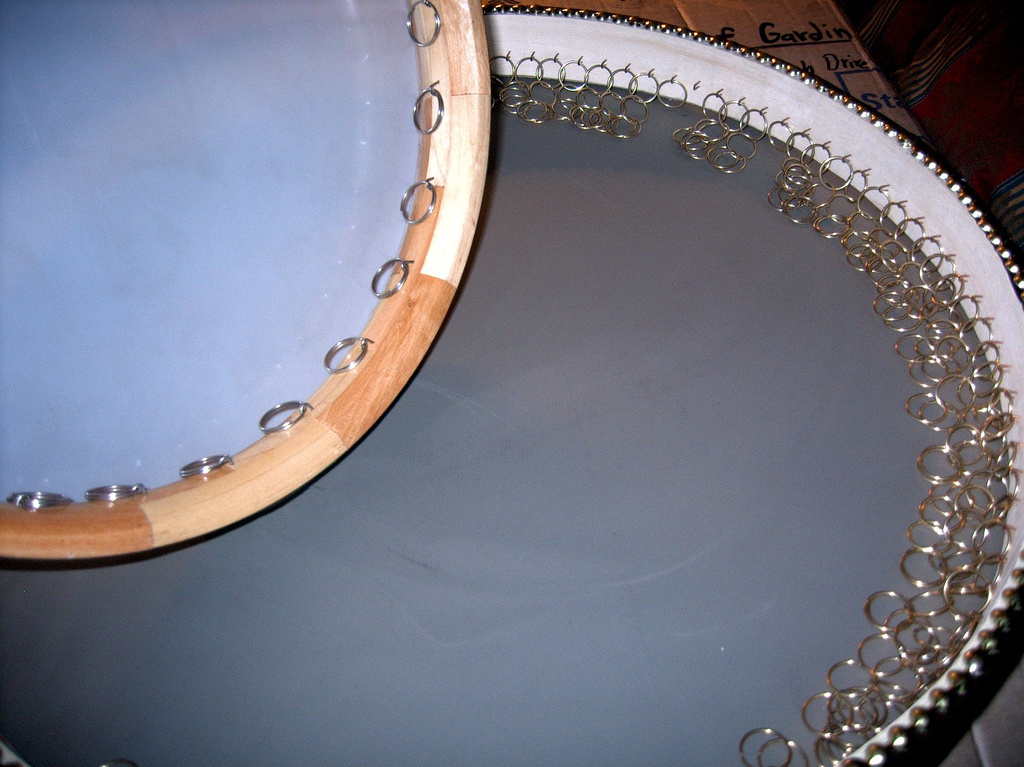

Percussion
- Other names: dafli, dap, def, tef, defi, qaval, duf, duff, dof, doira
- Classification: Directly struck membranophones
- Hornbostel–Sachs classification: 211.311 (Handle-less frame drum with one usable membrane)

Playing range
- High sound of jingles, plus some have a skin with a lower sound

Related instruments
- Buben, timbrel, tambourine, kanjira, frame drum, parai

The daf (Persian: دف), also known as dap (دپ), dâyere or riq, is an Iranian frame drum musical instrument, also used in popular and classical music in Persian-influenced South Asia and Central Asia, such as in Afghanistan, Azerbaijan, Tajikistan, Iran, Uzbekistan, Turkey many regions of Georgia, Armenia, Pakistan as well as in parts of India and Russian polar regions. It is also popular among Balkans, Caucasians, Bukharan Jews, Kurds, and Macedonians.

The daf is the national musical instrument of Pakistan and is also depicted on the reverse and obverse of the Azerbaijani 1 qəpik coin and 1 manat banknote respectively, since 2006.

It traditionally has a round wooden frame (although in the modern era it may also be made of metal), jingles, and a thin, translucent head made of fish- or goat-skin (or, more recently, a synthetic material).

The sound is produced by hitting the membrane with either hand – the left hand, which also holds the daf, strikes the edges, and the right hand strikes the center. The right-hand fingers are fastened about their neighbours and suddenly released, like the action of finger-snapping, to produce loud, rapid, sharp sounds.

== History ==
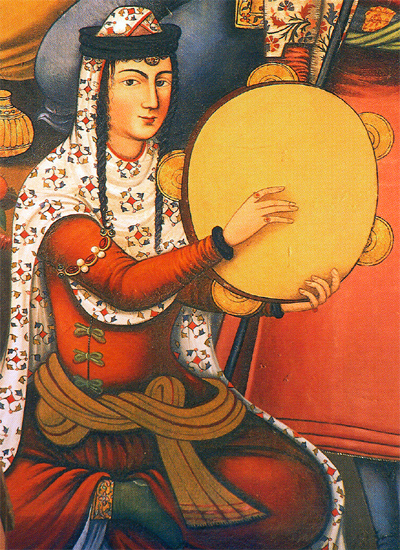
Daf in a miniature, Isfahan, Iran

The Pahlavi (Middle Persian) name of the daf is dap (دپ); the frame drum used in traditional Uyghur music has the similar name dāp (داپ).

Some pictures of daf have been found in paintings that date before the Common Era. The presence of the Iranian daf in the 6th–5th century BCE Behistun Inscription suggests that it existed before the rise of Islam and Sufism.

Iranian music has always been a spiritual tool.

It shows that daf played an important role in Mazdean Iran emerging as an important element during the Sassanian period, during the Kâvusakân dynasty.

Also, there is a kind of square frame drum in the stonecutting of Taq-e Bostan (another famous monument located 5km northeast of Kermanshah city). These frame drums were played in the ancient Middle East, Greece, and Rome and reached medieval Europe through Islamic culture.

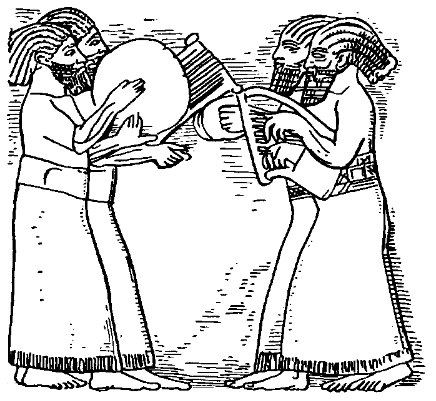
Daf depicted in middle Assyrian empire relief 1392 BC–934 BC

Nowruz (the first day of the Iranian New Year and the national festival of the Iranian people) and other festive occasions have been accompanied by daf in the Sassanid periods (224 AD–651 AD). In this period, the daf was played in order to accompany Iranian classical music.

Dafs were likely used in the court to be played in the modes and melodies of traditional music. This traditional or classical music was created by Barbod the Great and was named the khosravani after the mythical king Khosrow II.

Recent research reveals that these modes were used in the recitation of Mazdean (Zoroastrian) prayers. The modes were passed down from master to student and are today known as the radif and dastgāh system.

Many of the melodies were lost, but most of those that remain date to the Sassanid period. Dafs can be played to produce highly complex and intense rhythms, causing one to go under a trance and reach an ecstatic and spiritually-high state. For this reason, they have always been connected with religion in Iran.

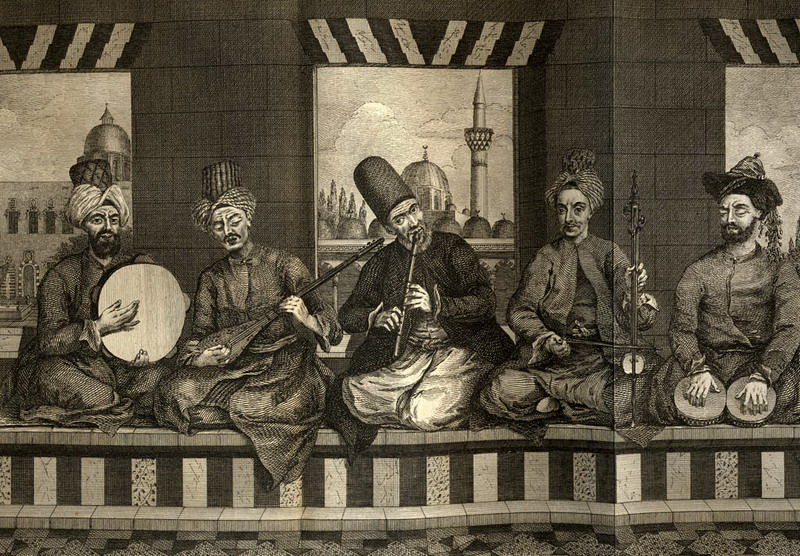
Musicians in Aleppo, Syria; the musician on the far left uses the daf

An engraved bronze cup from Lorestan at the National Museum of Iran in Tehran, portrays a double ney (end-blown reed pipes), chang (harp), and a daf in a shrine or court processional, as similarly documented in Egypt, Elam, and the Persian province of Babylonia, where music was arranged for performance by large orchestral ensembles.

The Arabs introduced the daf and other Middle Eastern musical instruments to Spain, and the Spanish adapted and promoted the daf and other musical instruments (such as the guitar) in medieval Europe. In the 15th century, the daf was only used in Sufi ceremonies; the Ottomans reintroduced it to Europe in the 17th century.

The daf still functions as an important part of Iranian music (both traditional and classical) as it did in ancient times. It successfully encourages many young Iranians to take up learning this ancient instrument.

Daf, and its smaller version called dafli, is also used across India. It is believed to have arrived along with other Persian influences in the medieval era, and is a popular folk instrument. In southern India, its use became mainstream, especially in protests, during the early half of the 20th century. Since the 1950s, it has also been used prominently in Bollywood.

=== In Islam ===
In Islam, the daf holds special importance in conservative Sunni communities as it is the only musical instrument whose use is permitted, specifically by women during celebrations and men in battle.

It also holds special importance in Islamic Sufi music.

== Structure and construction ==
The jingles, which are thin metal plates or rings, are attached to hooks in three or four rectangular holes in the circular wooden frame.

The drumhead is made of fish or goat skin. The width of the frame is 45–50 centimetres (18–20 in) and the depth, 5–7 centimetres (2–3 in). In order to bend the frame, the wood ("buka", "orev") may be softened in water before being bent around a hot metal cylinder. The frame is closed by gluing the ends together. Finally, the skin is attached to the frame by fixing it with another wooden frame or by using nails.

Another variation is to have the ring-style jingles arranged around the edge of the inside of the drum the whole way around or to have several tiers half way around the inside edge.

== Notable performers ==
- Ulfatmo Mamadambarova, singer and musician
- Alayev Family, a Bukharian Jewish musical ensemble based in Israel

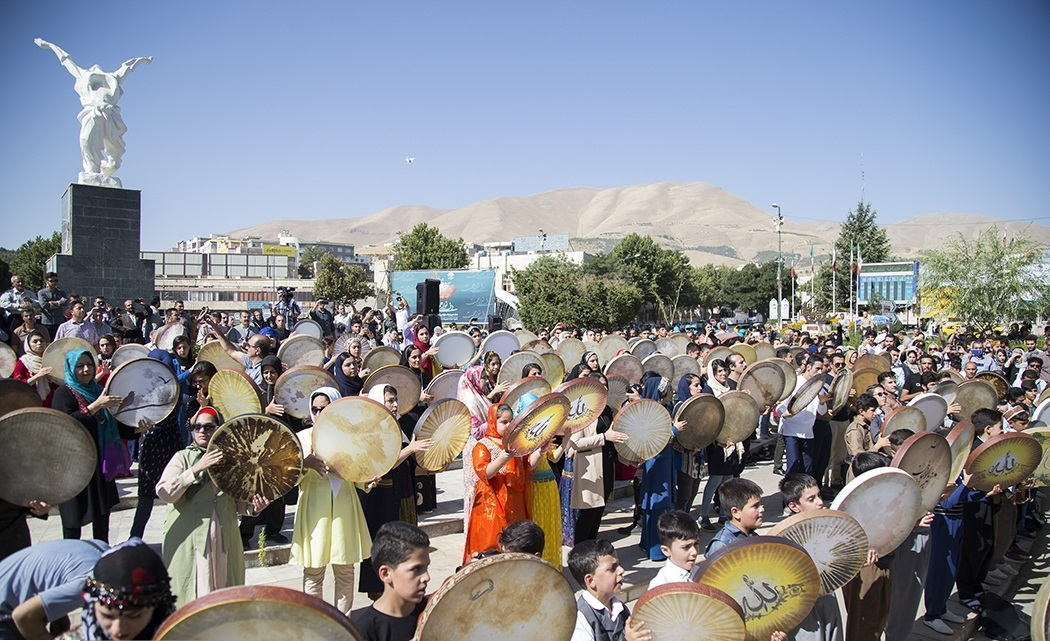
Iranian Kurds from Sanandaj, Iran

== See also ==
- Tar (drum)
- Bodhrán
- Bendir
- Mazhar
- Davul
- Innaby – Azerbaijani dance
