= Mazhar =

Large, heavy tambourine used in Arabic music

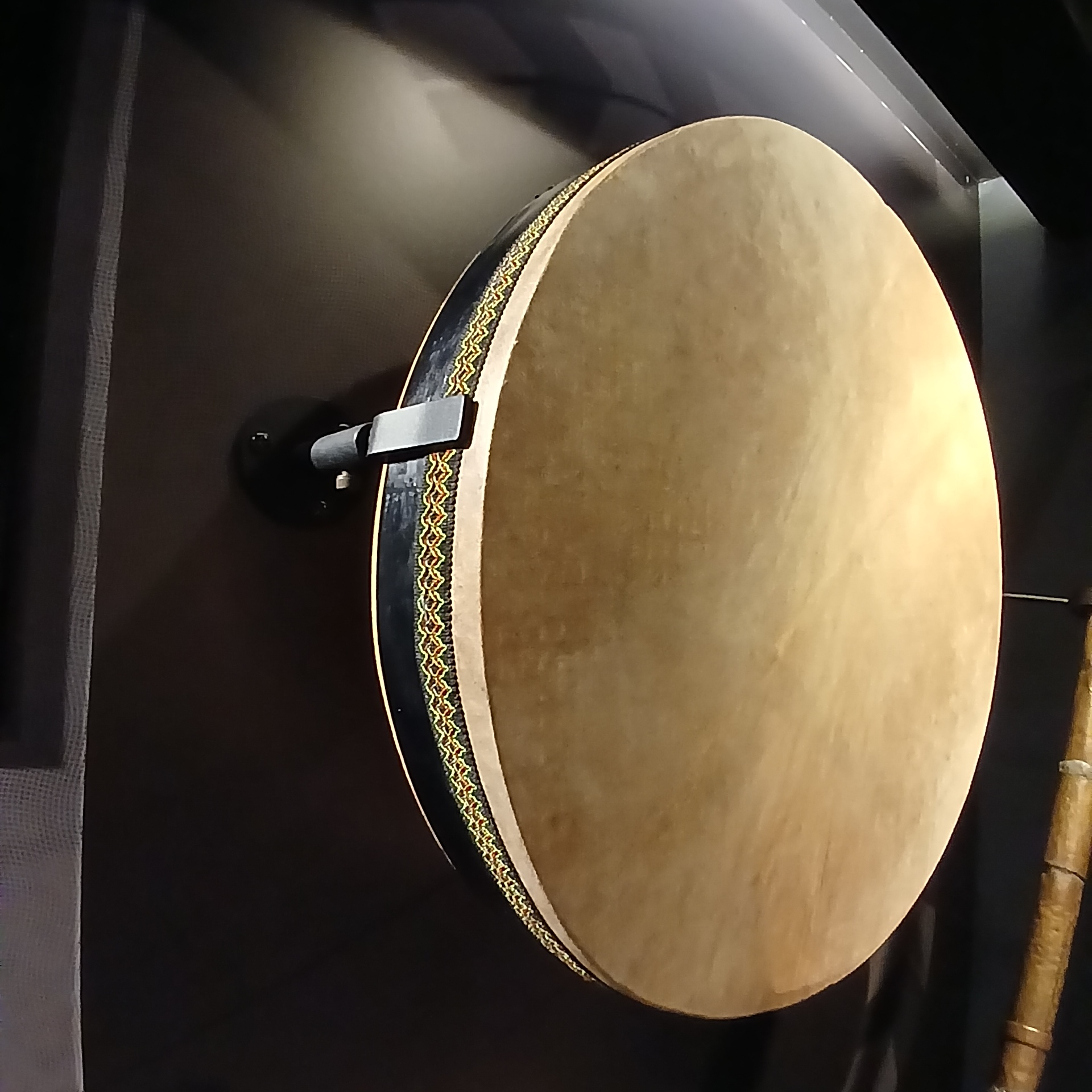

Percussion instrument
- Other names: مزهر
- Classification: Frame drum
- Hornbostel–Sachs classification: 211.311 (Directly struck membranophone)

The mazhar (Arabic: مزهر; pl.: mazāhar, مزاهر) is a large, heavy tambourine used in Arabic music. The mazhar's frame is generally made out of wood. Its single head is considerably thicker than that of the riq, its smaller cousin. Some drums have brass zills that are about 10–13 centimetres (4–5 inches) in diameter; these may be played with a shaking technique.

The Egyptian percussionist Hossam Ramzy was a notable performer of the mazhar.

== See also ==
- Riq
- Daf
- Tar
- Bendir
- Davul
