= Tar (drum) =

Single-headed frame drum

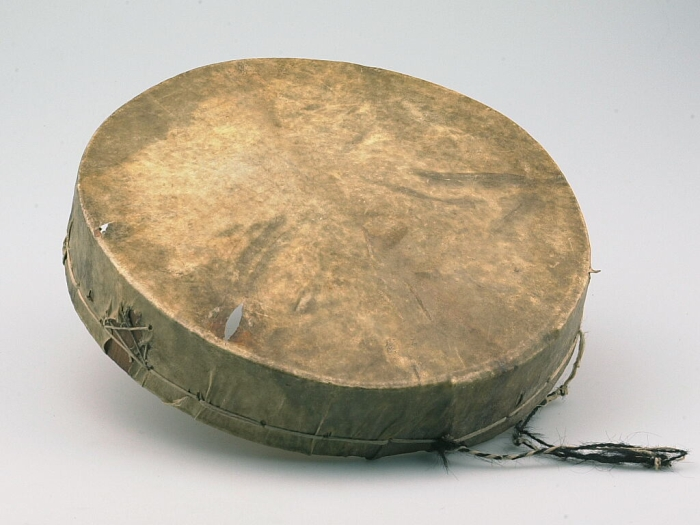

Percussion instrument
- Classification: Frame drum
- Hornbostel–Sachs classification: 211.311 (Directly struck membranophone)

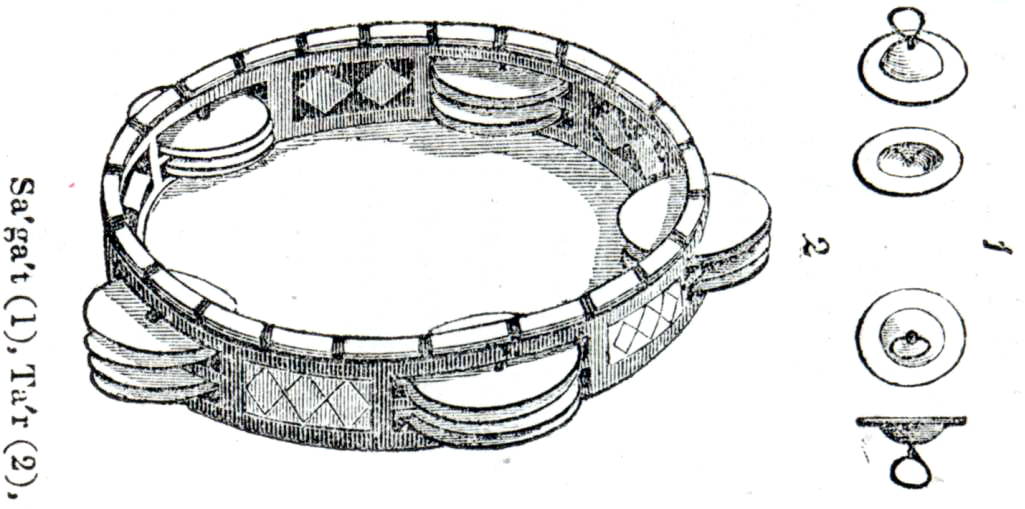
Illustration of an Egyptian tár with zills. The frame is covered with tortoiseshell and nacre.

The tar (Arabic: طار) is an ancient, single-headed frame drum. It is commonly played in the Middle East and North Africa. The tar's drumhead is struck with one hand.

The drumhead was usually made from animal skin like goats, while the frame was made of wood.

== See also ==
- Daf or riq
- Mazhar
- Bendir
- Davul
- Ardah
