= Ilu (drum) =

Yoruba name for a type of Brazilian wooden folk drum

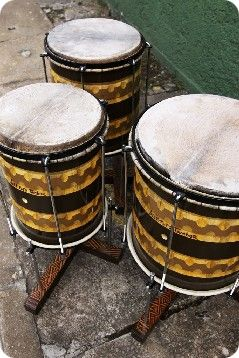
- A set of 3 different sized Ilús

Percussion instrument
- Other names: Ilú; Ilu
- Classification: Percussion
- Hornbostel–Sachs classification: 211.212 (Directly struck membranophone with two usable membranes)

An Ilú or Ilu is the Yoruba name for a type of Brazilian wooden folk drum, found characteristically in the northern provinces of Pernambuco and Ceará.

It has a cylindrical shape with skins at the top and bottom and is normally played with hands. It is mostly used in religious rituals, coming usually in three sizes, curved or flat-shaped. This makes these drums sound slightly different from each other, and to allow performers to play on a standing position. They are built on a cross-shaped base.

The same term was earlier used for double-headed barrel-shaped drums, a similar drum from southern Brazil is known as a Tambu.
