= Punch and Judy =

Traditional British puppet show

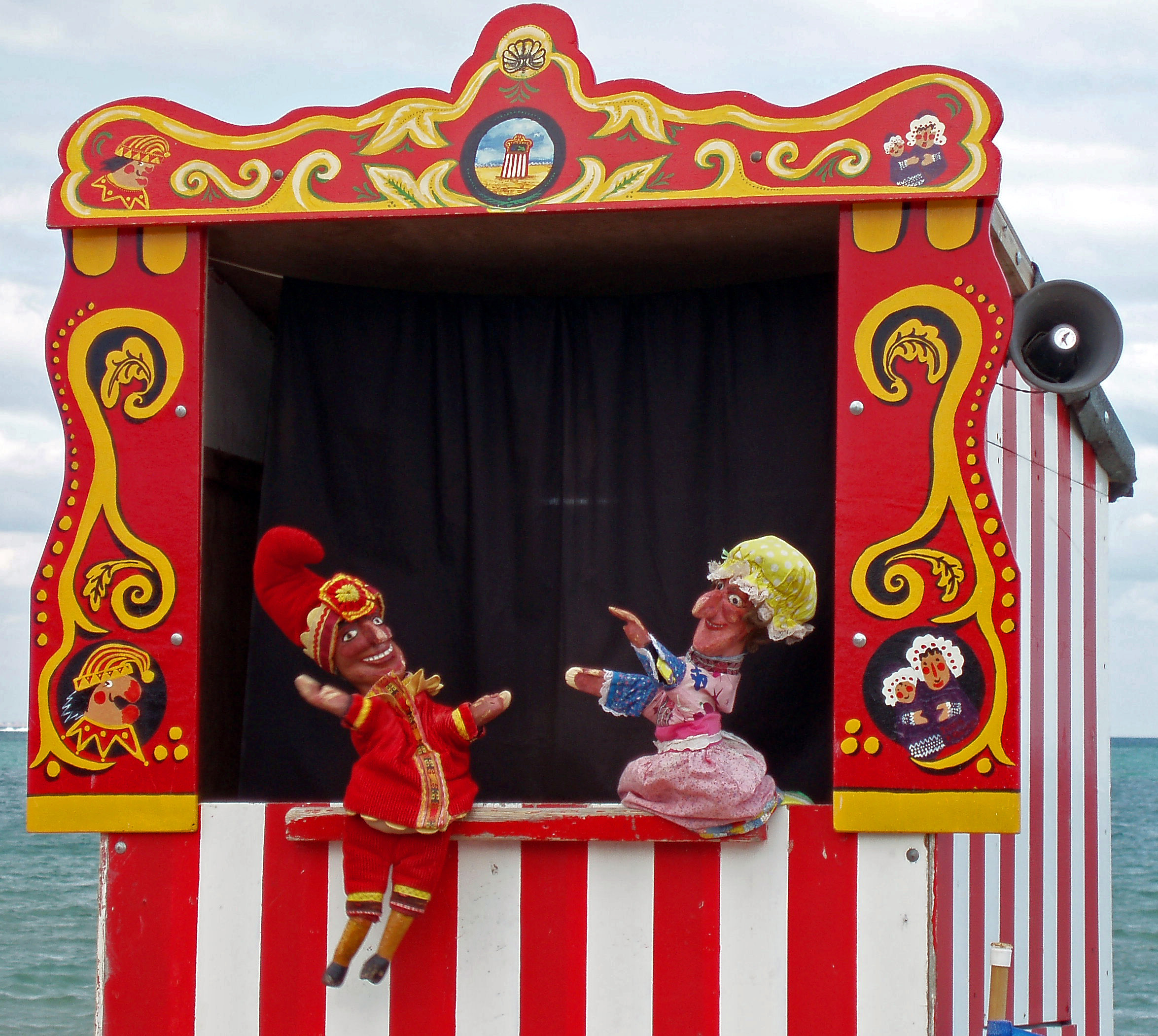
A traditional Punch and Judy booth, at Swanage, Dorset, England. Punch is pictured to the left, Judy to the right.

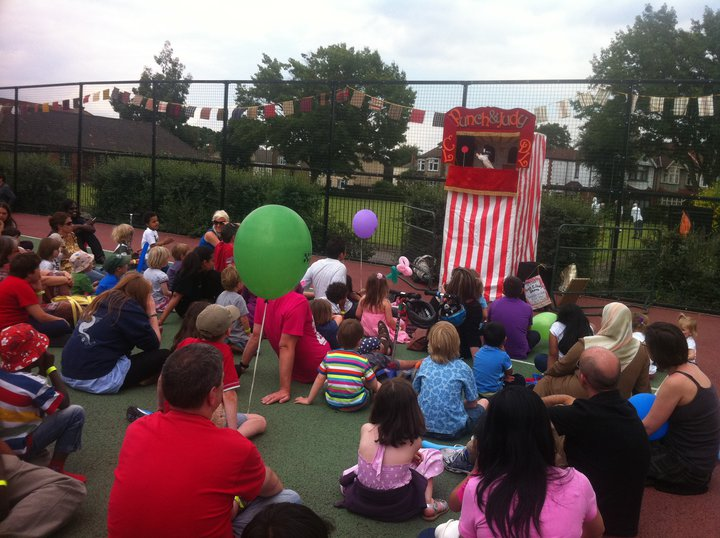
Punch and Judy at an English fete

Punch and Judy is a traditional English puppet show featuring Mr Punch and his wife Judy. The performance consists of a sequence of short scenes, each depicting an interaction between two characters, most typically the anarchic Mr Punch and one other character who usually falls victim to the intentional violence of Punch's slapstick. First appearing in England in 1662, Punch and Judy was called by The Daily Telegraph "a staple of the British seaside scene". The various episodes of Punch comedy—often provoking shocked laughter—are dominated by the clowning of Mr Punch.

The show is performed by a single puppeteer inside the booth, known since Victorian times as a "professor" or "punchman", and assisted sometimes by a "bottler" who corrals the audience outside the booth, introduces the performance, and collects the money ("the bottle"). The bottler might also play accompanying music or sound effects on a drum or guitar, and engage in back chat with the puppets, sometimes repeating lines that may have been difficult for the audience to understand. In the Victorian era, the drum and pan pipes were the instruments of choice. Today, most professors work solo, since the need for a bottler became less important when street performing gave way to paid engagements at private parties or public events. In modern shows the audience is encouraged to participate, calling out to the characters on the stage—typically shouting "He's behind you!"—to warn them of danger or clue them in to what is going on behind their backs.

In a 2006 public poll Punch and Judy was named one of the icons of Englishness. The puppet show, and its characters, remain influential in British popular culture and is celebrated annually at the Covent Garden May Fayre and Puppet Festival in London, the birthplace of the tradition.

== History ==
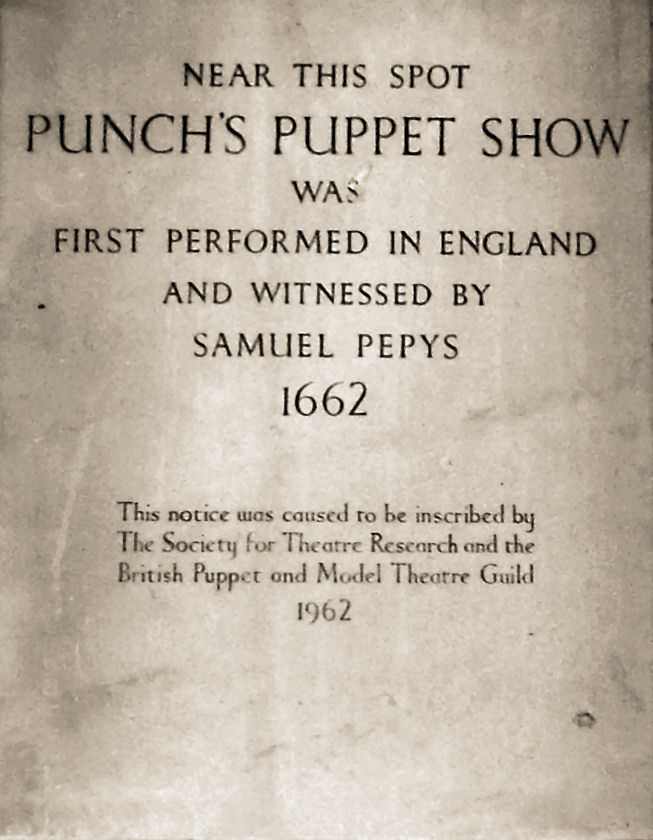
Plaque at St Paul's in Covent Garden, London commemorating the first recorded performance of Punch and Judy in 1662

The Punch and Judy show, labelled an "English entertainment icon" by the London Museum, has roots in the 17th century Italian commedia dell'arte. The figure of Punch is derived from the Neapolitan stock character of Pulcinella, which was anglicised to Punchinello. He is a variation on the same themes as the Lord of Misrule and the many Trickster figures found in mythologies across the world. Punch's wife was originally called "Joan".

[Pulcinella] went down particularly well with Restoration British audiences, fun-starved after years of Puritanism. We soon changed Punch's name, transformed him from a marionette to a hand puppet, and he became, really, a spirit of Britain – a subversive maverick who defies authority, a kind of puppet equivalent to our political cartoons.

— Punch and Judy showman Glyn Edwards.

The figure who became the anarchic Mr Punch made his first recorded appearance in England on 9 May 1662, which is traditionally reckoned as Punch's UK birthday. Punch and Judy began to emerge during the Restoration Period (beginning in 1660), a period during which art and theatre thrived. King Charles II took the throne in 1660 and replaced Puritan leaders Oliver Cromwell and Richard Cromwell, and theatre culture was revived. Cromwell strictly adhered to the Puritan belief that theatre was immoral and should be banned, resulting in their closure in 1642. The repressive regime also saw street entertainers jailed. Charles II's ascension to the throne ended the interregnum, Puritan legislation was declared null and void, and a more tolerant period of art and culture was ushered in. William Langley of The Telegraph writes Punch and Judy "owes much of its original success to the bleak killjoyism of Cromwell's England. Charles II's resumption of the throne in 1660 unleashed a huge public demand for popular entertainment". The diarist Samuel Pepys observed a marionette show featuring an early version of the Punch character in Covent Garden in London. It was performed by Italian puppet showman Pietro Gimonde, a.k.a. "Signor Bologna", one of many entertainers from continental Europe who came to England following the restoration. Pepys described the event in his diary as "an Italian puppet play, that is within the rails there, which is very pretty".

In the Punch and Judy show, Punch speaks in a distinctive squawking voice, produced by a contrivance known as a swazzle or swatchel which the professor holds in his mouth, transmitting his gleeful cackle. This gives Punch a vocal quality as though he were speaking through a kazoo. Joan's name was changed to Judy because "Judy" was easier to enunciate with the swazzle than "Joan". So important is Punch's signature sound that it is a matter of some controversy within Punch and Judy circles as to whether a "non-swazzled" show can be considered a true Punch and Judy Show. Other characters do not use the swazzle, so the Punchman has to switch back and forth while still holding the device in his mouth.

Punch and Judy shows were traditionally marionette shows when they were brought over from Italy, but were later reinvented in the glove puppet style to accommodate the characters' violent movements without the obstruction of marionette strings. Glove puppets were often operated by placing the thumb in one arm, the middle, ring, and little fingers in the other arm, and the index finger in the head.

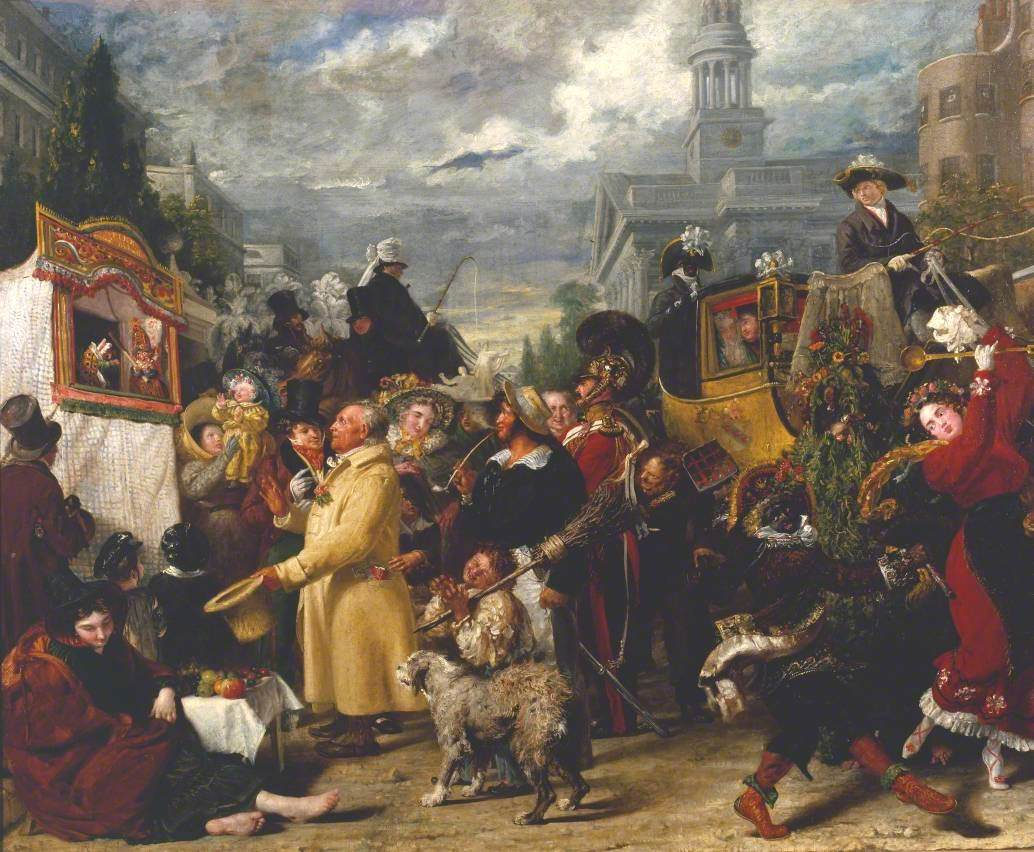
Punch or May Day, 1829 painting by Benjamin Robert Haydon depicting a street scene in London including a Punch and Judy show

In the early 18th century, the puppet theatre starring Punch was at its height, with showman Martin Powell attracting sizable crowds at both his Punch's Theatre at Covent Garden and earlier in provincial Bath, Somerset. Powell has been credited with being "largely responsible for the form taken by the drama of Punch and Judy". In 1721, a puppet theatre opened in Dublin that ran for decades. The cross-dressing actress Charlotte Charke ran the successful but short-lived Punch's Theatre in the Old Tennis Court at St. James's, Westminster, presenting adaptations of Shakespeare as well as plays by herself, her father Colley Cibber, and her friend Henry Fielding. Fielding eventually ran his own puppet theatre under the pseudonym Madame de la Nash to avoid the censorship concomitant with the theatre Licensing Act 1737.

Punch was extremely popular in Paris and, by the end of the 18th century, he was also playing in Britain's former American colonies, where George Washington, a fan of the show, bought tickets. However, marionette productions were expensive and cumbersome to mount and transport, presented in empty halls, the back rooms of taverns, or within large tents at England's yearly agricultural events at Bartholomew Fair and Mayfair. In the latter half of the 18th century, marionette companies began to give way to glove-puppet shows, performed from within a narrow, lightweight booth by one puppeteer, usually with an assistant, or "bottler", to gather a crowd and collect money. These shows might travel through country towns or move from corner to corner along busy London streets, giving many performances in a single day. The character of Punch adapted to the new format, going from a stringed comedian who might say outrageous things to a more aggressive glove-puppet who could do outrageous—and often violent—things to the other characters.

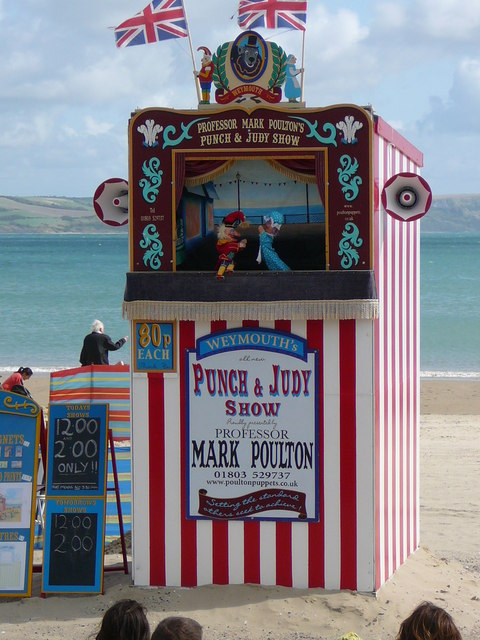
A Punch and Judy show — with the red-and-white-striped puppet booth — at Weymouth Beach, Dorset on the south coast of England

The mobile puppet booth of the late 18th- and early 19th-century Punch and Judy glove-puppet show could be easily fitted-up and was originally covered in checked bed ticking or whatever inexpensive cloth might come to hand. Later Victorian booths were gaudier affairs, particularly those used for Christmas parties and other indoor performances. In the 20th century, however, red-and-white-striped puppet booths became iconic features on the beaches of many English seaside and summer holiday resorts.

A more substantial change came over time to the show's target audience. The show was originally intended for adults, but it changed into primarily a children's entertainment in the late Victorian era. Ancient members of the show's cast ceased to be included, such as the Devil and Punch's mistress "Pretty Polly", when they came to be seen as inappropriate for young audiences.

The story changes, but some phrases remain the same for decades or even centuries. For example, Punch dispatches his foes each in turn and still squeaks his famous catchphrase: "That's the way to do it!" The term "pleased as Punch" is derived from Punch and Judy; specifically, Mr Punch's characteristic sense of gleeful self-satisfaction.

Modern British performances of Punch and Judy are no longer exclusively the traditional seaside children's entertainments which they had become. They can now be seen at carnivals, festivals, birthday parties, and other celebratory occasions. The association of Punch with the seaside, however, is still very strong, as demonstrated by Wisbech Town council's annual Wis-BEACH day each summer: "all the seaside favourites are on show, including a donkey, deck chairs, Punch and Judy and fish and chips".

== Characters ==
Punch and Judy, taken in Islington, north London

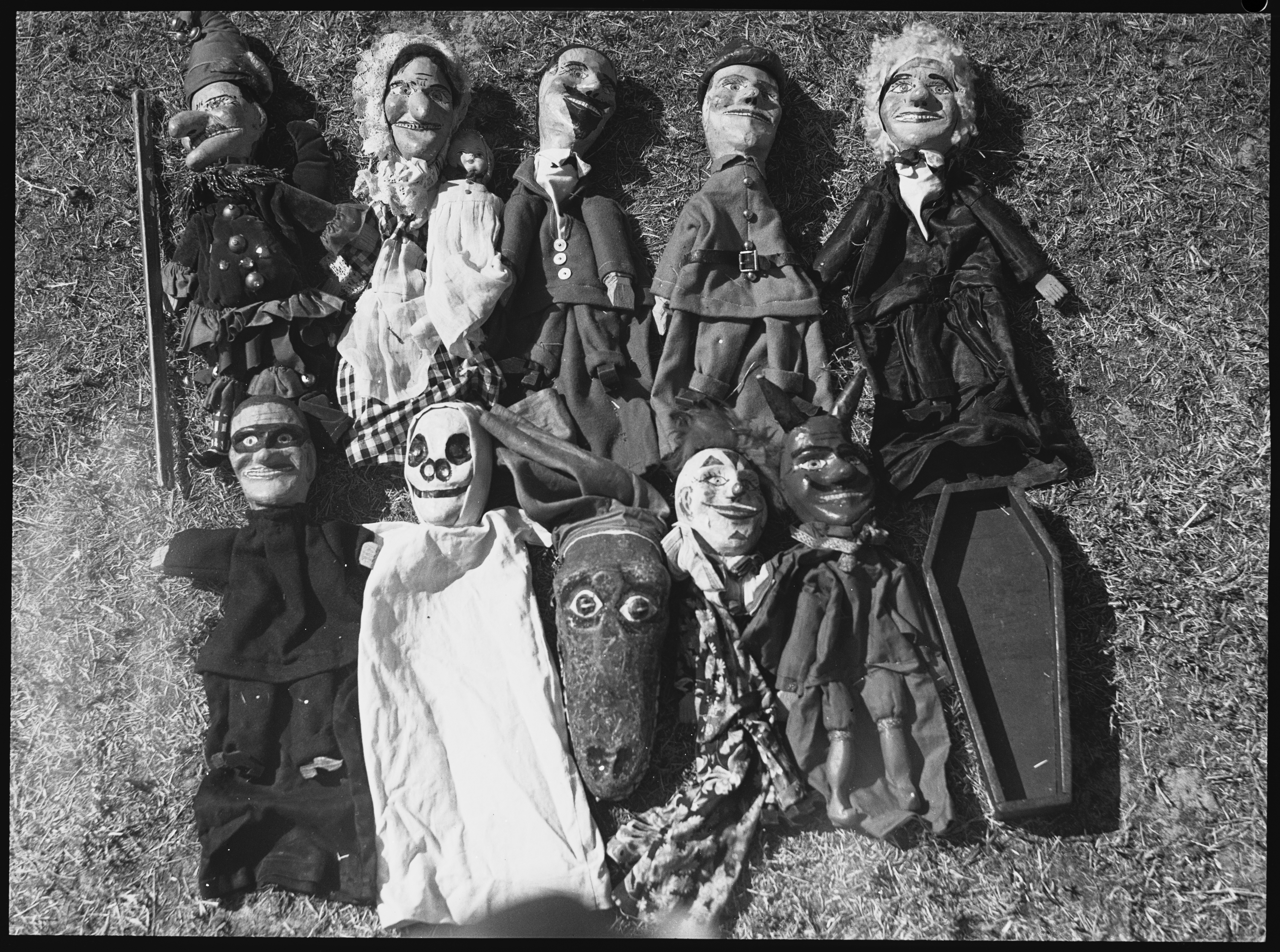
Punch and Judy characters, Sydney, 1940

The characters in a Punch and Judy show are not fixed. They are similar to the cast of a soap opera or a folk tale such as Robin Hood: the principal characters must appear, but the lesser characters are included at the discretion of the performer. New cast may be added and older cast dropped as the tradition changes.

Along with Punch and Judy, the cast of characters usually includes their baby, a hungry crocodile, a clown, an officious policeman, and a prop string of sausages. The devil and the generic hangman Jack Ketch may still make their appearances but, if so, Punch will always get the better of them. The cast of a typical Punch and Judy show today will include:

- Mr Punch
- Judy
- The Babe
- The Constable (a.k.a. Policeman Jack)
- Joey the Clown
- The Crocodile
- The Skeleton
- The Doctor

Characters once regular but now occasional include:

- Toby the Dog
- The Ghost
- The Lawyer
- Hector the Horse
- Pretty Polly
- The Hangman (a.k.a. Jack Ketch)
- The Devil
- The Beadle
- Jim Crow ("The Black Man")
- Mr Scaramouche
- The Servant (or "The Minstrel")
- The Blind Man

Other characters included Boxers, Chinese Plate Spinners, topical figures, a trick puppet with an extending neck (the "Courtier"), and a monkey. A live Toby the Dog was once a regular featured novelty routine, sitting on the playboard and performing "with" the puppets.

Punch wears a brightly coloured (traditionally red) jester's motley and sugarloaf hat with a tassel. He is a hunchback whose hooked nose almost meets his curved, jutting chin. He carries a stick (called a slapstick) as large as himself, which he freely uses upon most of the other characters in the show. Judy wears an apron, a blue dress, and a bonnet and frequently tries to tell Punch off when he uses the slapstick.

== Story ==
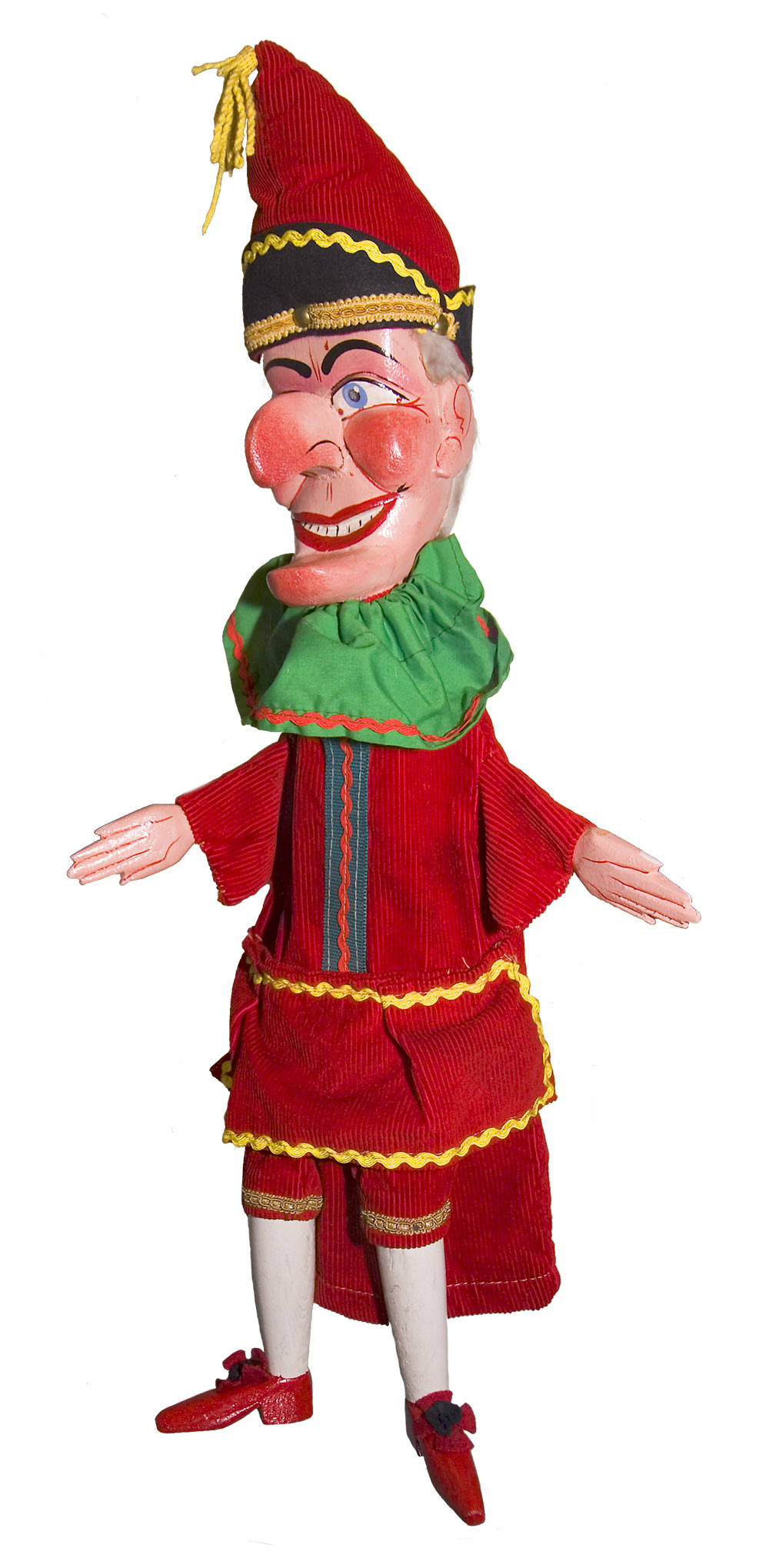
Mr. Punch

Glyn Edwards has likened the story of Punch and Judy to the story of Cinderella. He points out that there are parts of the Cinderella story which everyone knows, namely the cruel step sisters, the invitation to the ball, the handsome prince, the fairy godmother, Cinderella's dress turning to rags at midnight, the glass slipper left behind, the prince searching for its owner, and the happy ending. None of these elements can be omitted and the famous story still be told. The same principle applies to Punch and Judy. Everyone knows that Punch mishandles the baby, that Punch and Judy quarrel and fight, that a policeman comes for Punch and gets a taste of his stick, that Punch has a gleeful run-in with a variety of other figures and takes his stick to them all, that eventually he faces his final foe (which might be a hangman, the devil, a crocodile, or a ghost). Edwards contends that a proper Punch and Judy show requires these elements or the audience will feel let down.

Peter Fraser writes, "the drama developed as a succession of incidents which the audience could join or leave at any time, and much of the show was impromptu." This was elaborated by George Speaight, who explained that the plotline "is like a story compiled in a parlour game of Consequences ... the show should, indeed, not be regarded as a story at all but a succession of encounters." Robert Leach makes it clear that "the story is a conceptual entity, not a set text: the means of telling it, therefore, are always variable." Rosalind Crone asserts that the story needed to be episodic so that passersby on the street could easily join or leave the audience during a performance.

Much emphasis is often placed on the first printed script of Punch and Judy, in 1827. It was based on a show by travelling performer Giovanni Piccini, illustrated by George Cruikshank, and written by John Payne Collier. This is the only surviving script of a performance, and its accuracy is questioned. The performance was stopped frequently to allow Collier and Cruikshank to write and sketch and, in the words of Speaight, Collier is someone of whom "the full list of his forgeries has not yet been reckoned, and the myths he propagated are still being repeated. (His) 'Punch and Judy' is to be warmly welcomed as the first history of puppets in England, but it is also sadly to be examined as the first experiment of a literary criminal."

The tale of Punch and Judy varies from puppeteer to puppeteer, as previously with Punchinello and Joan, and it has changed over time. Nonetheless, the skeletal outline is often recognizable. It typically involves Punch behaving outrageously, struggling with his wife Judy and the baby, and then triumphing in a series of encounters with the forces of law and order (and often the supernatural), interspersed with jokes and songs.

=== Typical 21st-century performance ===
A typical show as performed currently in the UK will start with the arrival of Mr. Punch, followed by the introduction of Judy. They may well hug, kiss, and dance before Judy requests Mr. Punch to look after the baby while she is away. Punch will fail to carry out this task appropriately. It is rare for Punch to hit his baby these days, but he may well sit on it in a failed attempt to "babysit", or drop it, or even let it go through a sausage machine. In any event, Judy will return, will be outraged, will fetch a stick, and the knockabout will commence. A policeman will arrive in response to the mayhem and will himself be felled by Punch's stick. All this is carried out at breakneck farcical speed with much involvement from a gleefully shouting audience. From here on anything goes.

Joey the Clown might appear and suggest, "It's dinner time." or tease Mr. Punch. This will lead to the production of a string of sausages, which Mr. Punch must look after, although the audience will know that this really signals the arrival of a crocodile whom Mr. Punch might not see until the audience shouts out and lets him know. Punch's subsequent comic struggle with the crocodile might then leave him in need of a Doctor who will arrive and attempt to treat Punch by walloping him with a stick until Punch turns the tables on him. Punch may next pause to count his "victims" by laying puppets on the stage, only for Joey the Clown to move them about behind his back in order to frustrate him. A ghost might then appear and give Mr. Punch a fright before it too is chased off with a stick.

In older productions, a hangman would arrive to punish Mr. Punch, only to himself be tricked into sticking his head in the noose. "Do you do the hanging?" is a question often asked of performers. Some will include it where circumstances warrant (such as for an adult audience) but most do not. Finally, the show will often end with the Devil arriving for Mr. Punch (and possibly threatening his audience as well). Punch—in his final gleefully triumphant moment—will win his fight with the Devil, bring the show to a rousing conclusion, and earn a round of applause.

=== Plots reflect their own era ===
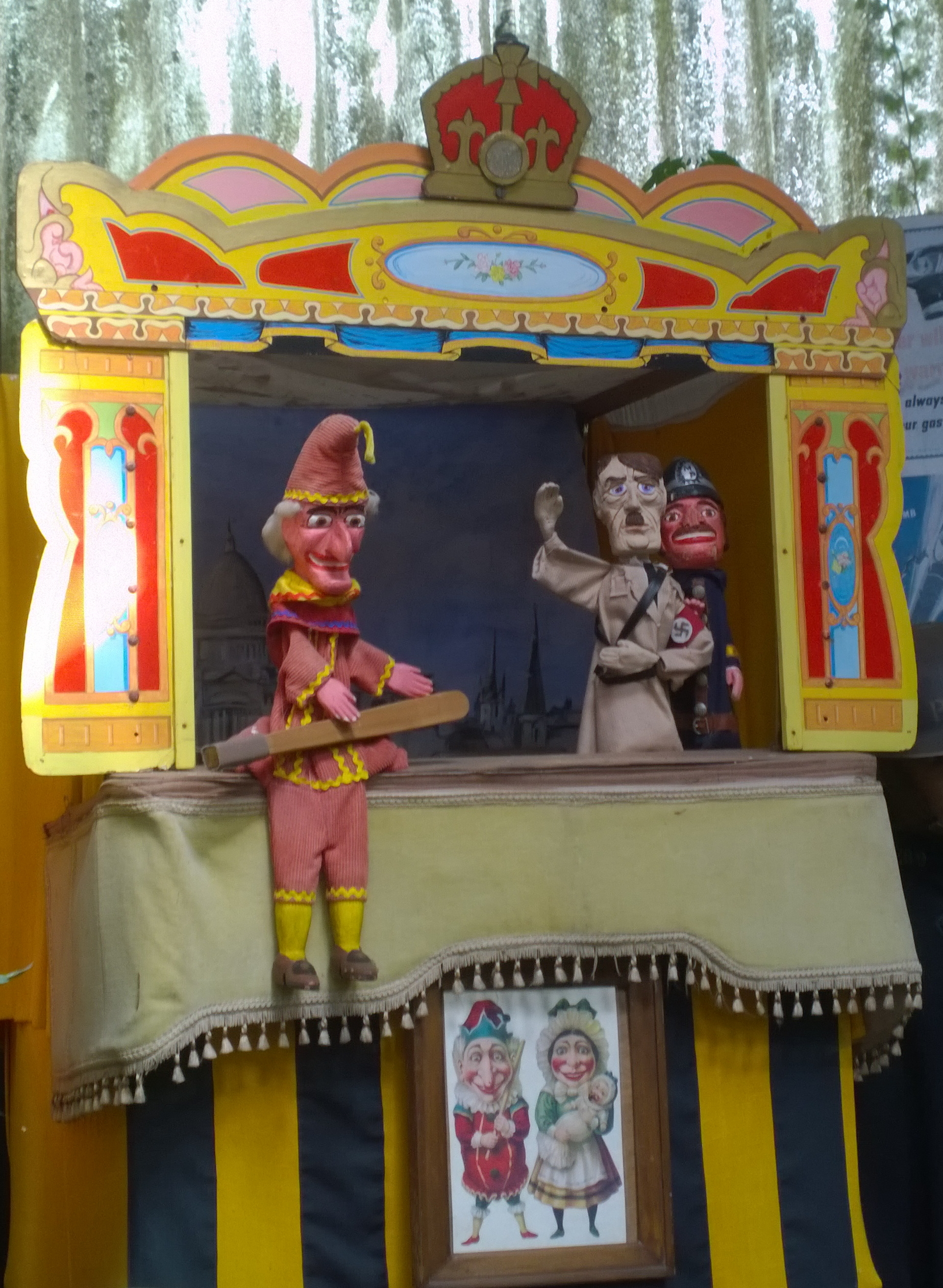
A traditional Punch and Judy show dating from World War II with the addition of a Hitler character as a figure of derision to reflect the times. Taken at the History On Wheels Museum, Eton Wick, England.

Punch and Judy might follow no fixed storyline, as with the tales of Robin Hood, but there are episodes common to many recorded versions. It is these set piece encounters or "routines" which are used by performers to construct their own Punch and Judy shows. A visit to a Punch and Judy Festival at Punch's "birthplace" in London's Covent Garden will reveal a whole variety of changes that are wrung by puppeteers from this basic material. Scripts have been published at different times since the early 19th century, but none can be claimed as the definitive traditional script of Punch and Judy. Each printed script reflects the era in which it was performed and the circumstances under which it was printed.

The various episodes of the show are performed in the spirit of outrageous comedy—often provoking shocked laughter—and are dominated by the anarchic clowning of Mr. Punch. Just as the Victorian version of the show drew on the morality of its day, so also the Punch & Judy College of Professors considers that the 20th- and 21st-century versions of the tale is used as a vehicle for grotesque visual comedy and a sideways look at contemporary society.

In my opinion the street Punch is one of those extravagant reliefs from the realities of life which would lose its hold upon the people if it were made moral and instructive. I regard it as quite harmless in its influence, and as an outrageous joke which no one in existence would think of regarding as an incentive to any kind of action or as a model for any kind of conduct. It is possible, I think, that one secret source of pleasure very generally derived from this performance… is the satisfaction the spectator feels in the circumstance that likenesses of men and women can be so knocked about, without any pain or suffering.

— Charles Dickens, Letter to Mary Tyler, 6 November 1849, from The Letters of Charles Dickens Vol V, 1847–1849.

An awareness of the prevalence of domestic abuse, and how Punch and Judy could be seen to make light of this, has caused changes in Punch and Judy performances in the UK and other English-speaking countries. The show continues to be seen in England, Wales, and Ireland—and in Canada, the United States, the Caribbean and Puerto Rico, Australia, New Zealand, and South Africa. In 2001, the characters were honoured in the UK with a set of British commemorative postage stamps issued by the Royal Mail. In a 2006 UK poll, the public voted Punch and Judy onto the list of icons of England. In 2024, a new version of the show was staged at London's Covent Garden. It was developed as part of the Judy Project, a three year study of the roles that women have played in the tradition of puppetry, by a University of Exeter team. The violence in this version of the show is directed more towards institutions of authority rather than any individuals, and Judy questions the treatment she has received from Punch over hundreds of years.

== Comedy ==
Despite Punch's unapologetic murders throughout the performances, it is still considered a comedy. The humour is aided by a few things. Rosalind Crone suggests that, since the puppets are carved from wood, their facial expressions cannot change, but are stuck in the same exaggerated pose, which helps to deter any sense of realism and to distance the audience. The use of the swazzle also helps to create humour, and that the swazzled sound of Punch's voice takes the cruelty out of Punch. According to Crone, a third aspect that helped make the violence humorous was that Punch's violence toward his wife was prompted by her own violence toward him. In this aspect, he retains some of his previous hen-pecked persona. This would suggest that, since Punch was merely acting violently out of self-defence, it was okay. This is a possible explanation for the humour of his violence toward his wife, and even towards others who may have somehow "had it coming." This suggestion better explains the humour of the violence toward the baby. Other characters that had to incur the wrath of Punch varied depending on the punchman, but the most common were the foreigner, the blind man, the publican, the constable, and the devil.

== Published scripts ==
Punch is primarily an oral tradition, adapted by a succession of exponents from live performances rather than authentic scripts, and in constant evolution. They exist, however, in some early published scripts of varying authenticity.

In 1828, the critic John Payne Collier published a Punch and Judy script under the title The Tragical Comedy or Comical Tragedy of Punch and Judy. The script was illustrated by the well-known caricaturist George Cruikshank. Collier said his script was based on the version performed by the "professor" Giovanni Piccini in the early 19th century, and Piccini himself had begun performing in the streets of London in the late 18th century. The Collier/Cruickshank Punch has been republished in facsimile several times. Collier's later career as a literary forger has cast some doubt on the authenticity of the script, which is rather literary in style and may well have been tidied up from the rough-and-tumble street-theatre original.

A transcript of a typical Punch and Judy show in London may be found in Henry Mayhew's London Labour and the London Poor.

== Legacy ==
=== Literature ===
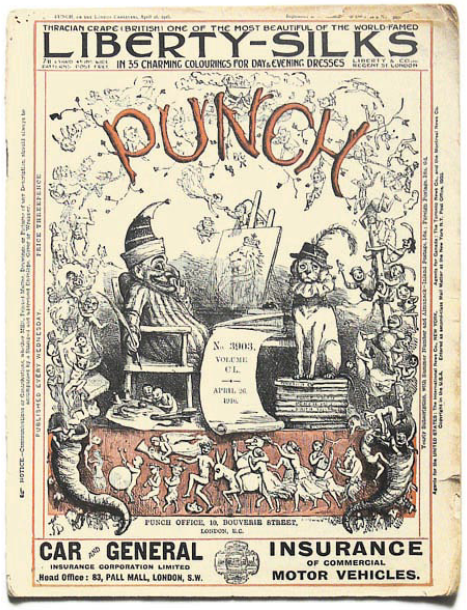
Mr Punch depicted on the cover of Punch magazine, 26 April 1916

The editors of the British satirical magazine Punch, established in 1841, took the anarchic Mr Punch as their mascot, with the character also an inspiration for the magazine's name.

The 1913 short story "The Story of a Disappearance and an Appearance" by M. R. James features supernatural events around a Punch and Judy show.

Russell Hoban's 1980 novel Riddley Walker features a post-apocalyptic version of a Punch and Judy show.

Terry Pratchett's 1993 short murder mystery story "Theatre of Cruelty" was inspired by Punch and Judy. It is set in his Discworld fantasy universe, and a Punch and Judy show is also referenced briefly in the 2003 Discworld novel Monstrous Regiment.

Jasper Fforde's 2006 novel The Fourth Bear features Mr Punch and his wife Judy as major characters.

The 2011 novel Rivers of London (Midnight Riot in the US) by Ben Aaronovitch is embedded in the story of Punch and Judy to tell a story of a ghostly serial killer.

=== Musical theatre ===
In 2013, a musical inspired by the Punch and Judy characters premiered in Sweden at Arbisteatern in Norrköping, Carnival Tale (Tivolisaga) written by Johan Christher Schütz and Johan Pettersson. With a storyline loosely inspired by Shakespeare's Romeo and Juliet, a travelling carnival arrives in a small town and the foreign carnival's star jester Punch falls in love with the Mayor's daughter Judy. The original Swedish cast recording is freely available online and features Disney Channel Scandinavia presenter Linnéa Källström as Judy. The story and songs originate from a pop band called Punch and Judy Show, started by Schütz and Pettersson in the late 1990s.

=== Film ===
George Pal would adapt the Punch and Judy archetypes for two Puppetoon shorts in the form of two younger characters named Punchy and Judy. In their first short A Hatful of Dreams, Punchy receives a magical hat from a talking horse that he uses to dazzle Judy. In the second short Together in the Weather, the two are reimagined as figures on a "weather clock" who live in two different houses. Punchy and Judy would also appear regularly in numerous Puppetoon comic books.

A performance of Punch and Judy features prominently in the 1963 film Charade directed by Stanley Donen starring Cary Grant and Audrey Hepburn with the two lead characters watching the show while the inspector lurks nearby. The film's composer Henry Mancini also recorded a song titled "Punch and Judy" for the film soundtrack.

Judy and Punch is a 2019 Australian film written and directed by Mirrah Foulkes which retells the plot of the puppet show as a black comedy-drama. It stars Damon Herriman as "Punch" and Mia Wasikowska as "Judy". The film first premiered at the 2019 Sundance Film Festival. The plot reimagines the classic puppet show as a revenge tale, in which Judy and Punch are married puppeteers in the fictional town of Seaside, with a popular show about themselves. Following the traditional element of the show, Punch's carelessness leads to the death of their baby, prompting a fight between him and Judy. Having been thought dead after Punch's beating, Judy survives with the help of village outcasts and decides to enact her revenge on her husband, who has scapegoated their servants. The film took Best Original Music Score and Best Actor (Herriman) at the 9th AACTA Awards, and had seven other nominations.

=== Song ===
Punch is faithfully celebrated in the 1977 UK novelty hit "Naughty Naughty Naughty", in which Joy Sarney interacts romantically with an authentic Mr Punch, complete with swazzle, stick, and his traditional catch phrases including "That's the way to do it" and "Oh no it isn't". The song made it into the top 30 of the UK Singles Chart and was performed on the BBC television series Top of the Pops. "Naughty Naughty Naughty" remains Sarney's only hit.

The British band Marillion had a UK Top 40 single called "Punch and Judy" in 1984. American singer-songwriter Elliott Smith included a song titled after the show on his 1997 album, Either/Or. The show is also referenced in Jack Stauber's "Good Morning Blondie", Blondie resembling a puppet and having an unhealthy relationship with the singing character. The show provides the title for XTC's unreleased 1981 single which treats the traditional Punch and Judy narrative as a metaphor for real life domestic abuse.

=== Television ===
Punch and Judy appear as Joker's oversized henchmen in The Batman television series. They made their first appearance in DC Comics in 1945, in Batman #31. In Japanese anime "Cowboy Bebop", there is a show called "Big Shot" where the two anchors are named Punch and Judy. Punch and Judy make a small appearance in the 1983 Doctor Who episode Snake Dance, in which Mr. Punch is attacked by a snake.

=== Video games ===
A video game called "Punchy" was released for the ZX Spectrum and Commodore 64 home computers in the 1980s. In the game, Punch holds Judy hostage in the booth, and the player takes the role of Bobby the policeman who has to rescue her, overcoming custard pies, tomatoes and pits, as well as tackling Mr Punch himself.

== See also ==
- Guignol
- Kasperle
- Petrushka
