= Directly struck membranophones =

Directly struck membranophones is one of the sub-categories of musical instruments found in the Hornbostel-Sachs system of musical instrument classification. The type of membranophones or drums found in this group are those instruments that produce sound when struck directly by the performer. The membrane of these drums is hit with a stick, the hand, or something else. Drums that produce sound by means of plucking an attached string or by means of friction are grouped in a different category.

211.1 Instruments in which the body of the drum is dish- or bowl-shaped (kettle drums)

211.11 Single instruments

211.12 Sets of instruments

211.2 Instruments in which the body is tubular (tubular drums)

211.21 Instruments in which the body has the same diameter at the middle and end (cylindrical drums)

211.211 Instruments which have only one usable membrane

211.211.1 Instruments in which the end without a membrane is open

211.211.2 Instruments in which the end without a membrane is closed

211.212 Instruments which have two usable membranes

211.212.1 Single instruments

211.212.2 Sets of instruments

211.22 Instruments in which the body is barrel-shaped (barrel drums)

211.221 Instruments which have only one usable membrane

211.221.1 Instruments in which the end without a membrane is open

211.221.2 Instruments in which the end without a membrane is closed

211.222 Instruments which have two usable membranes

211.222.1 Single instruments

211.222.2 Sets of instruments

211.23 Instruments in which the body is double-conical

211.231 Instruments which have only one usable membrane

211.231.1 Instruments in which the end without a membrane is open

211.231.2 Instruments in which the end without a membrane is closed

211.232 Instruments which have two usable membranes

211.232.1 Single instruments

211.232.2 Sets of instruments

211.24 Instruments in which the body is hourglass-shaped

211.241 Instruments which have only one usable membrane

211.241.1 Instruments in which the end without a membrane is open

211.241.2 Instruments in which the end without a membrane is closed

211.242 Instruments which have two usable membranes

211.242.1 Single instruments

211.242.2 Sets of instruments

211.25 Instruments in which the body is conical-shaped (conical drums)

211.251 Instruments which have only one usable membrane

211.251.1 Instruments in which the end without a membrane is open

211.251.2 Instruments in which the end without a membrane is closed

211.252 Instruments which have two usable membranes

211.252.1 Single instruments

211.252.2 Sets of instruments

211.26 Instruments in which the body is goblet-shaped (goblet drums)

211.261 Instruments which have only one usable membrane

211.261.1 Instruments in which the end without a membrane is open

211.261.2 Instruments in which the end without a membrane is closed

211.262 Instruments which have two usable membranes

211.262.1 Single instruments

211.262.2 Sets of instruments

211.3 Instruments in which the body depth is not greater than the radius of the membrane (frame drums)

211.31 Instruments which do not have a handle

211.311 Instruments which have only one usable membrane

211.312 Instruments which have two usable membranes

211.32 Instruments which have a handle

211.321 Instruments which have only one usable membrane

211.322 Instruments which have two usable membranes
