= Bedon =

Unpitched percussion instrument

A bedon is a membranophone (drum-like musical instrument) usually built with two membranes.

It seems to appear during the 14th century in France as examples are found in Jehan Froissart's poetry (Poésies, II, 352, 61 dans Gdf. Compl. : Princes, dont fu li grans bedons Sonnes, et en juoit Symons, Et Guios de la canemelle).

Examples of instruments can be found in images such as wood carvings in Medieval choir stalls (for instance in Rouen) dating from the 15th century.
