= Barbara Stewart =

Barbara Stewart may refer to:

- Barbara Stewart (composer) (1941–2011), American composer and musician
- Barbara Stewart (politician) (born 1952), New Zealand politician
