= Bendir =

Musical instrument

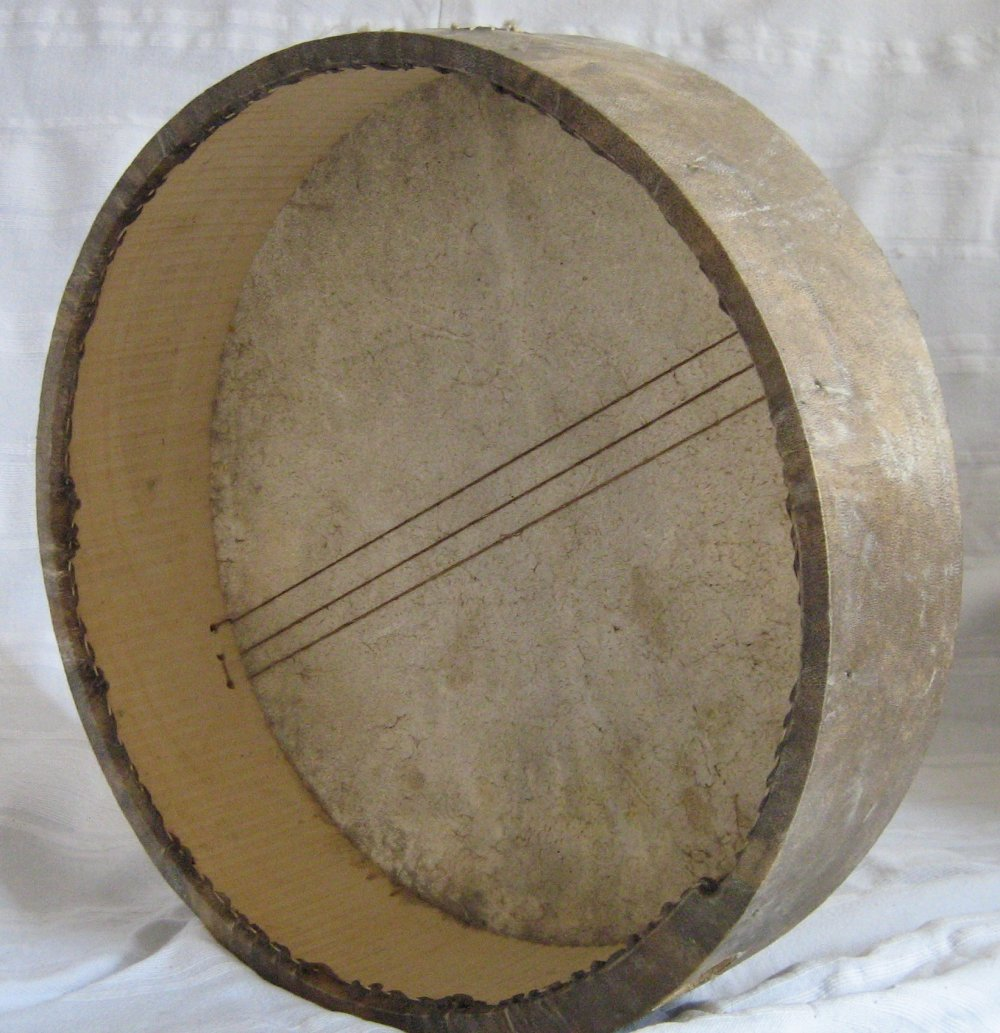
- A bendir with snares
- Hornbostel–Sachs classification: 211.3 (Membranophone)

The bendir (Arabic: بندير, bindīr; pl.: بنادير, binādīr) is a wooden-framed frame drum of North Africa and Southwest Asia.

The bendir is a traditional instrument that is played throughout North Africa, as well as in Sufi ceremonies; it was played, too, in Ancient Egypt and Mesopotamia. In Turkish, the word bendir means "a big hand frame drum".

== Construction and play ==
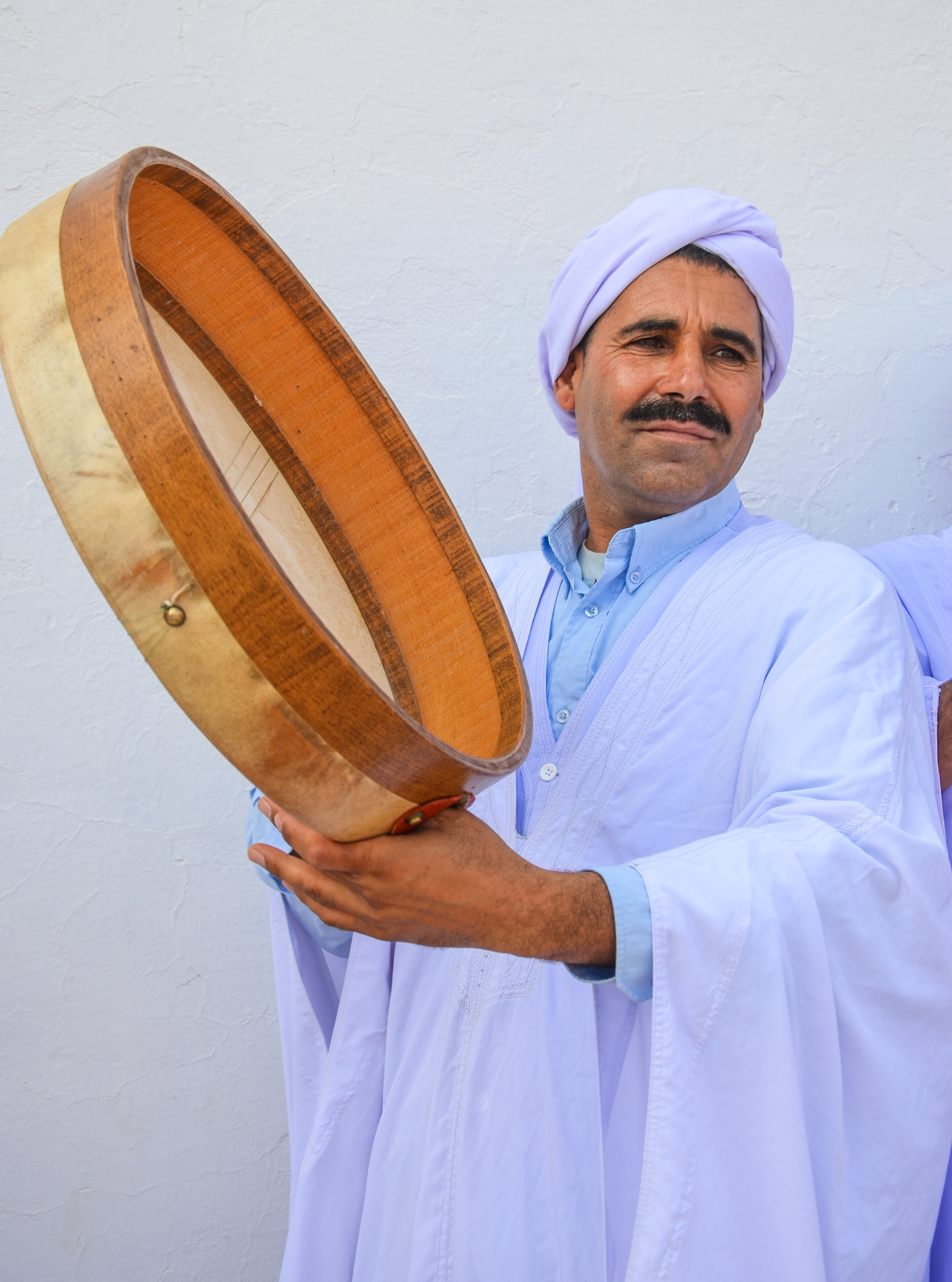
A man playing the bendir in Laghouat, Algeria

The bandir often has a snare (usually made of gut) stretched across the head, which gives the tone a buzzing quality when the drum is struck with the fingers or palm. The drum is played in a vertical position. One holds the drum by looping the thumb of the non-dominant hand through a hole in the frame.

Similar frame drums include the tar of Egypt and the bodhrán of Ireland. Unlike the bendir, the tar does not have a snare on the back of the frame, and the bodhrán is played with a beater.

== See also ==
- Daf
- Riq
- Mazhar
- Davul
- Long drum
