= Eunuch flute =

Simple musical instrument

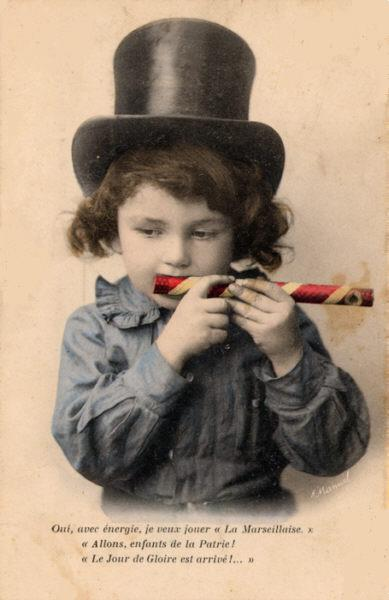
French mirliton circa 1910

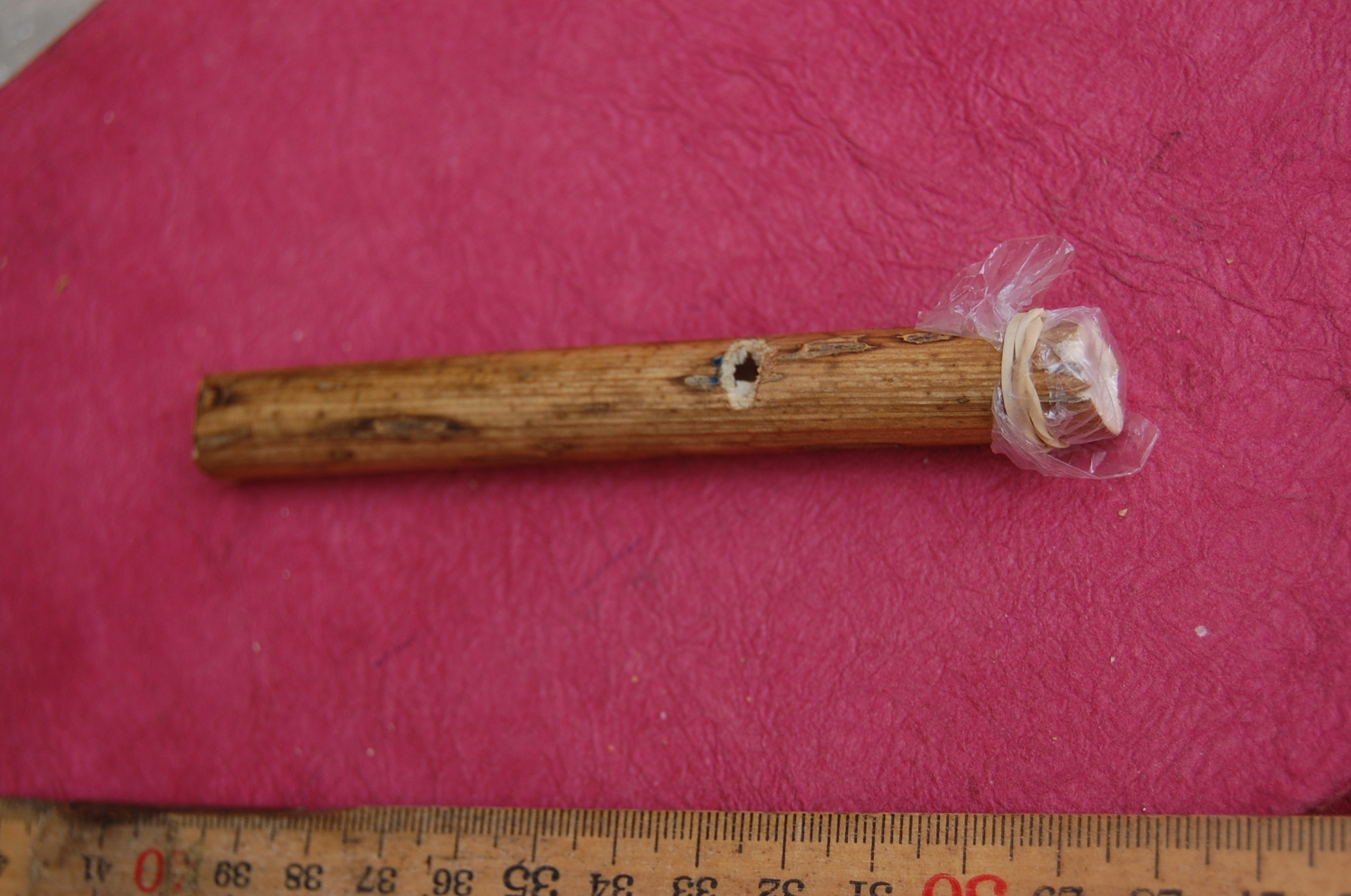
Eunuch flute made from a cicely stem

The eunuch flute, onion flute, or mirliton (/ˈmɜːrlɪtɒn/; French: flûte eunuque, flûte à l'oignon or mirliton; German: Zwiebelflöte) is a membranophone that was in use during the 16th and 17th centuries. It produces a sound akin to a comb and paper and is still manufactured as a toy.

The sound of the eunuch flute resembles that of a kazoo. Unlike the kazoo, it is held transversally (basically a transverse kazoo) against the mouth while the user vocalizes into the aperture.

The eunuch flute consists of a wooden tube widening out slightly to form a bell. The far end of the tube is closed by means of a very fine membrane similar to an onion skin stretched across the aperture like the vellum of a drum. The mouthpiece, a simple round hole, is pierced a couple of inches below the membrane. By singing into this hole, the performer sets up vibrations in the membrane (technically, a mirliton), which intensifies the sound and changes its timbre to a bleating quality. A movable cap fits over the membrane to protect it. Marin Mersennus states that the vibrations of the membrane improve the sound of the voice and by reflecting it, give it an added charm.

The Irish writer Samuel Beckett wrote a series of fifty-nine small poems in French called mirlitonnades after the instrument.

The Creole composer Edmond Dédé wrote Méphisto Masqué for grand orchestra and a fanfare of mirlitone instruments.

Tchaikovsky's 1892 ballet The Nutcracker features the "Danse des mirlitons" ("Dance of the Reed Flutes").

== See also ==
- Kazoo
- Swazzle
