= Footed drum =

Class of membranophone

Footed Drum
Percussion instrument
- Other names: Foot Drum
- Classification: hand percussion, Membranophone

A footed drum is a class of membranophone, of Native American and Polynesian origin, characterized by an open area at the bottom of the instrument, held by feet. This open area adds resonance to the drum's sound. It is made out of hollow wood and/or bone.

Archaeologists have unearthed 'foot drums' in several southwestern and central-Californian Native American archaeological sites inhabited, or formally inhabited, by the Miwok, Maidu, Aztec, and Hopi Indian tribes. These drums were often semicircle cross-sectioned hollow logs laid over wood covered 'resonating' pits positioned according to custom in kivas or dance houses. The foot drums were played by stomping on top of the hollow log with the structure's poles used for steadying.
