= Davul =

Musical instrument

Tabl
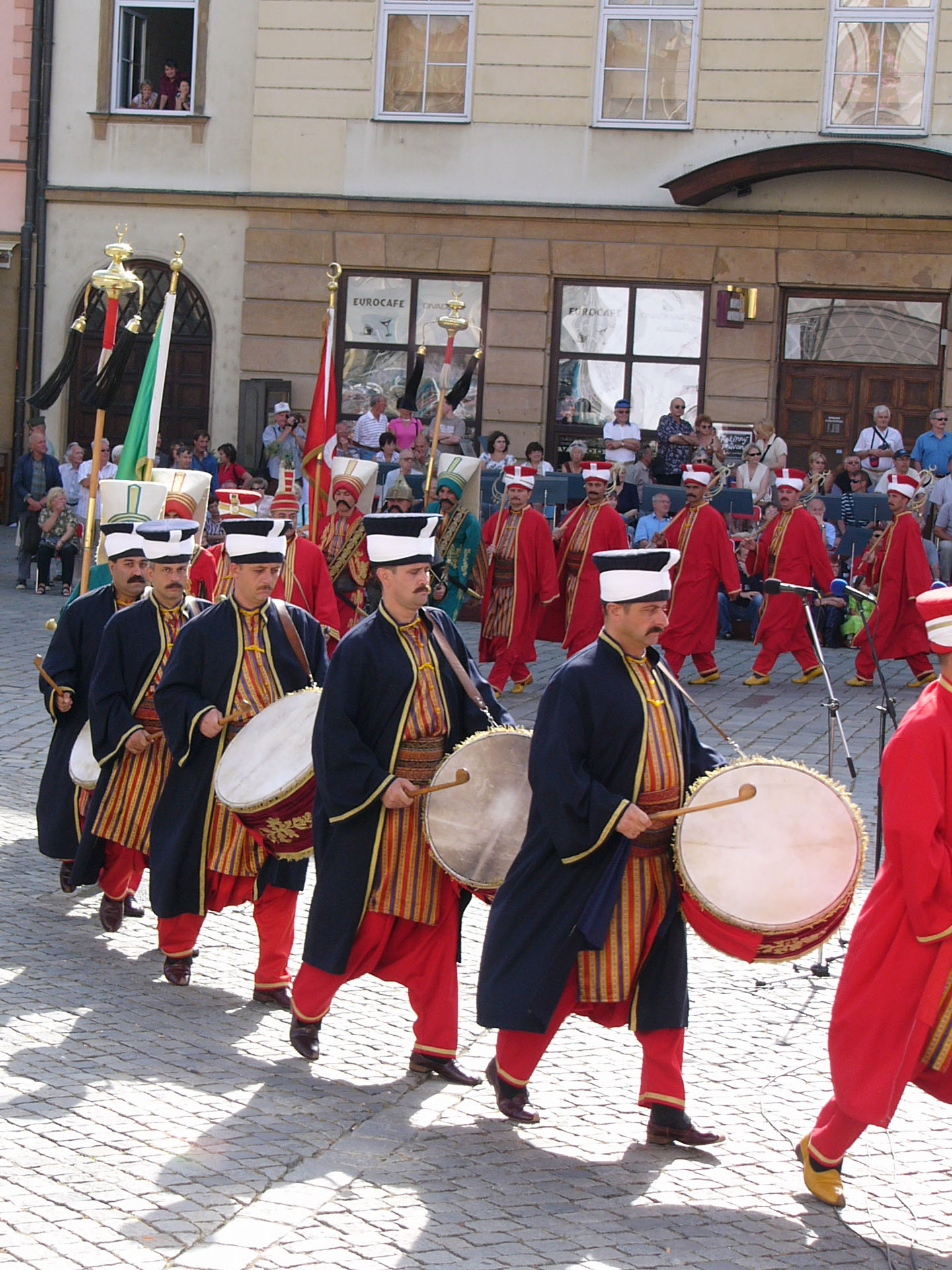

Percussion instrument
- Other names: Tabl, tapan, davul
- Classification: Percussion instrument (membranophone)

Playing range
- Rope tensioned

Sound sample
- Davul drum: file; help

The Tabl, tapan, atabal or davul is a large double-headed drum that is played with mallets. It has many names depending on the country and region. These drums are commonly used in the music of West Asia and the Balkans. These drums have both a deep bass sound and a thin treble sound due to their construction and playing style, where different heads and sticks are used to produce different sounds on the same drum.

== Names ==
Some names of davuls include:

- dhol (Armenian: դհոլ)
- dawola/tabla (Syriac: ܛܲܒܼܠܵܐ)
- dohol (Persian: دهل dohol)
- doli (Georgian: დოლი doli)
- davul (Turkish: davul, lit. 'drum')
- dahol (Kurdish: dahol, Southern Kurdish: Dîweł)
- davil (Tamil: davil)
- davula (Sinhala: දවුල)
- tupan (Goranian: tupan)
- daul, tǎpan, tupan (Bulgarian: тъпан, тупан)
- goč, tapan, tupan (Serbian: гоч, тапан, тупан)
- tapan, tupan (Macedonian: тапан, тупан)
- tobă/dobă (Romanian: tobă)
- tabl (Arabic: tabl or tabl baladi)
- tof (Hebrew: tof תוף)
- taoul(in) (Pontic: ταούλ(ιν), lit. 'drum')
- lodra, tupana, daulle, taborre (Albanian: lodra)
- moldvai dob, tapan (Hungarian: moldvai dob, tapan)

Other Greek names for this drum include Davouli, Argano, Toskani, Tsokani, Toubi, Toubaki, Kiossi, Tavouli, Pavouli, Toubano, and Toubaneli. Additionally, other names for the daouli, depending on the area, include toumpano, tymbano, or toumbi, which stem from the Ancient Greek: τύμπανον (týmpanon); this word exists in English in the word tympani for the drum section in the modern classical orchestra and the tympanic membrane for the eardrum.

== Traditional uses ==
In the southern Balkans, the rhythm of the tapan is complex and utilizes many accents in numerous traditional time signatures. In Macedonia, tapans are most often used to accompany other instruments such as the zurna and gaida, while in Bulgaria they usually accompany gaida and gadulka. They are also played solo in some Albanian, Bulgarian and Macedonian folk dances and songs. For centuries the tapan is irreplaceable at Bulgarian village festivities such as weddings and celebrations of patron saints of homes and villages. In Romania and Moldova the toba is sometimes used to accompany dances. Its use in Hungarian folk music is particularly popular among ethnic Hungarians in the historical region of Moldavia. In Moldavia, Maramures and Bihor there are also some varieties with a small cymbal mounted on top. They are generally struck with a wooden mallet on one skin and with a thinner stick on the rim or cymbal.

In Armenia, Turkey and Azerbaijan, the dhol/davul is most commonly played with the zurna, a wind instrument, although it can be played with other instruments and in ensembles as well. It has also traditionally been used for communication and for Turkish mehter, or janissary music. In The Levant, it is predominantly used for Dabke(traditional Levantine dance)accompanied by the Mijwiz, Minjayra(Lebanese and Syrian traditional flute known as Shubabeh in Palestine and Jordan)and for a Zaffe (Levantine celbratory wedding entrance) accompanied by the Mizmar, Minjayra or Mijwiz and for a Arada (Levantine celbratory entrance for the groom) accompanied by Mizmar, Derbake (Arab goblet drum) and other Levantine instruments. In Iraq it is used for Assyrian folk dance and Assyrian folk/pop music, among Assyrian people, which are mostly accompanied by a zurna. In Armenia, the dhol does not have as large of a circumference and is usually played with the hands, although a wooden, spoon-shaped drumstick is also used sometimes. It is frequently heard in Armenian folk music, usually along with other drums such as the dap, the dmblak, and native woodwinds such as the tsiranapogh, the sring, the shvi, the blul, the parkapzuk (Armenian bagpipe), and some stringed instruments like the tavigh, the pandir, the jnar and some of foreign origin, like the Iranian kamancha and the Arabic oud. Not only is it in folk music but also in modern music as well, even having solos in many prominent songs.

== Construction ==
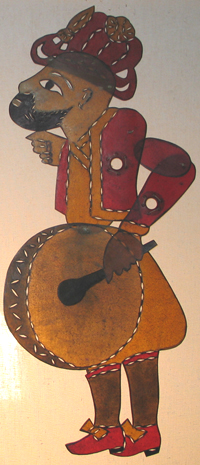
Davul in shadow puppet theater. Here, Karagöz is shown with his davul.

The drum shell is made of hard wood, perhaps walnut or chestnut, though many woods may be in use depending on the region where the drum is made. To make the shell, the wood is boiled in water to make it bendable, and then it is bent into a cylindrical shape and fastened together. The heads are usually goat skin, and they are shaped into circles by wooden frames. However, one head may be goat skin to provide a higher tone, while the other head can be sheepskin, calfskin, or even donkey-skin to provide a lower tone. Some say that wolf skin and even dog skin are preferred. Rope threaded back and forth across the shell of the drum, from head to head in a zigzag pattern, holds the heads on the drum and provides tension for tuning the drum. Sometimes metal rings or leather straps join neighboring strands of the rope in order to allow for further tuning. Two rings are sometimes attached to the main rope where a belt-like rope is threaded through to hold the drum.

In the former Yugoslavian republics and Bulgaria, the tapan is made in two dimensions, Bulgarian: golem, at about 50 – 55 cm diameter, and Bulgarian: mal or tapanche, at about 30 – 35 cm diameter.

In Turkey, davuls typically range in size from 60 cm to 90 cm in diameter. Cow hide is used for the bass pitch drum head side, while goat skin is used for the thin, high pitched side.

In Greece, daouli can be 12 to 14 inches for the toumbi up to 3 to 4 feet for daouli. Commonly the drum is about 20 to 30 inches.

== Playing style ==
Players often use a rope hooked to the drum to hold the drum sideways, so that one head is accessible with the left hand and one with the right. Each hand is usually dedicated to playing one side of the drum exclusively, though this can vary by local style and tradition.

Drummers of this drum typically uses two kinds of sticks. The drummer plays the accented beats with the dominant hand on the side of the drum with the thicker skin, using a special stick known as the Bulgarian: kukuda or ukanj, Turkish: tokmak, or Greek: daouloxylo (daouli stick). This stick is a thick pipe-like stick about 440 mm long, which is often made with walnut. Its thick shape as well as the thickness of the head give the accented beats a low, full sound. Sometimes the drumhead played with the thick stick is also muted with a cloth to enhance the fundamental low note of the drum. Unaccented beats are played by the nondominant hand on the side of the drum having the thin skin, using a thin stick or switch called Bulgarian: pracka, Turkish: çubuk, or Greek: daouloverga (daouli switch). This thin stick is often held cross-grip, and the drummer can quickly hit thin accent strokes by gently twisting the wrist. These thin sticks are often made from soft wood such as willow or cornel.

The Balkan school of tapan playing presumes the playing (not the accompaniment) of a melody, where the non-dominant hand is used to express all that the player wishes to say, while the dominant hand is only used to accentuate certain moments in the melody.

== See also ==
- Bendir
- Daf
- Dhol
- Mazhar
- Nagara (drum)
- Riq
- Tar (drum)
- Timpani
