= Conical drum =

Class of musical instruments

Conical drums are a class of membranophone, or drum, that are characterized by sloping sides. They are usually one-headed. An example is the timbal. The conical drum also has strings on the side to keep the object together.
