= Kazoo =

Toy musical instrument

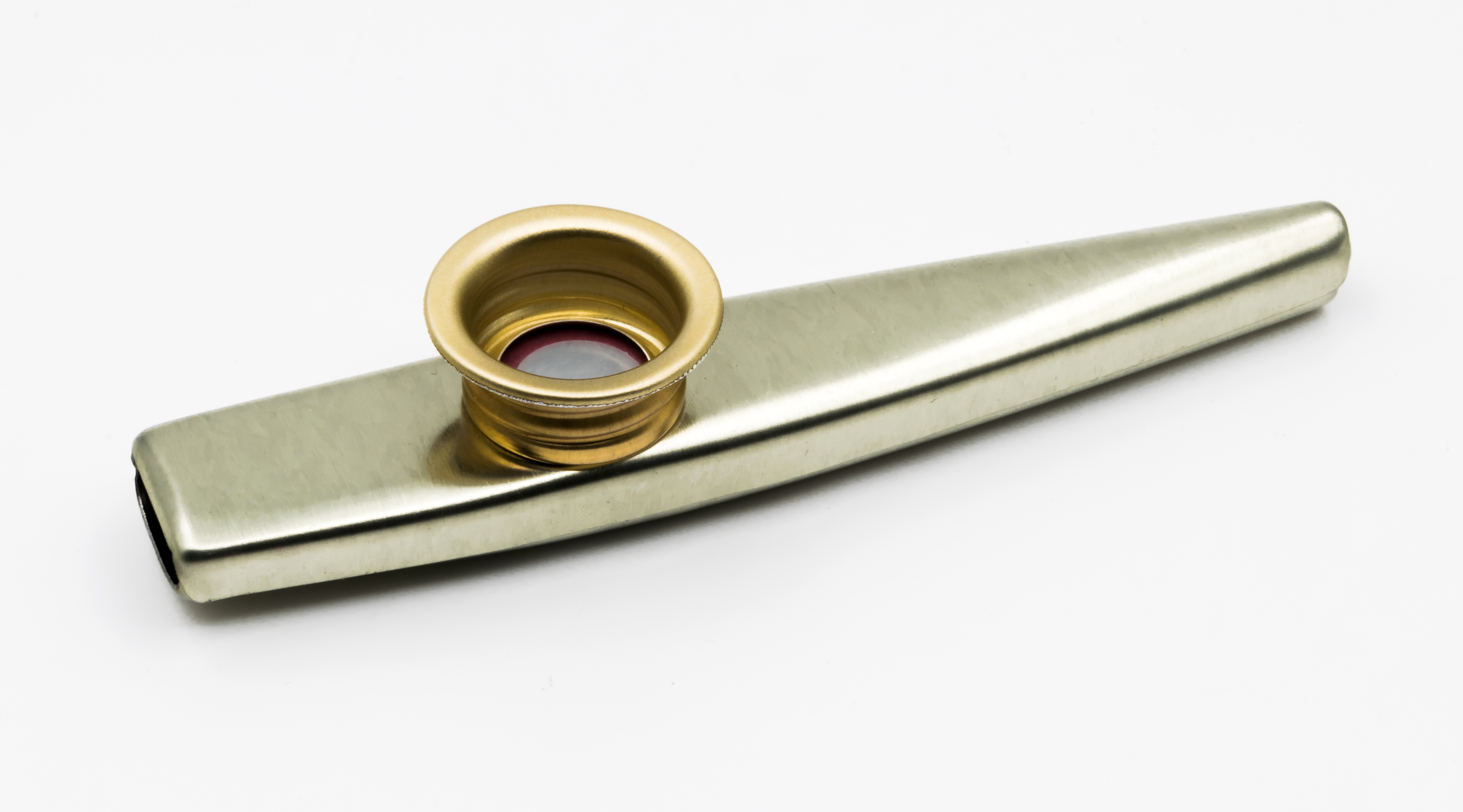
A metal kazoo

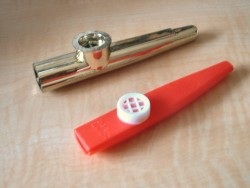
Other examples of kazoos

The kazoo is a musical instrument that adds a buzzing timbral quality to a player's voice when the player vocalizes into it. It is a type of mirliton (itself a membranophone), one of a class of instruments that modify the player's voice by way of a vibrating membrane of goldbeater's skin or material with similar characteristics. There is a smaller version of the kazoo, known as a humazoo.

== Playing ==
A kazoo player hums, rather than blows, into the wider and flattened side of the instrument. The oscillating air pressure of the hum makes the kazoo's membrane vibrate. The resulting sound varies in pitch and loudness with the player's humming. Players can produce different sounds by singing specific syllables such as doo, too, who, or vrrrr into the kazoo.

== History ==
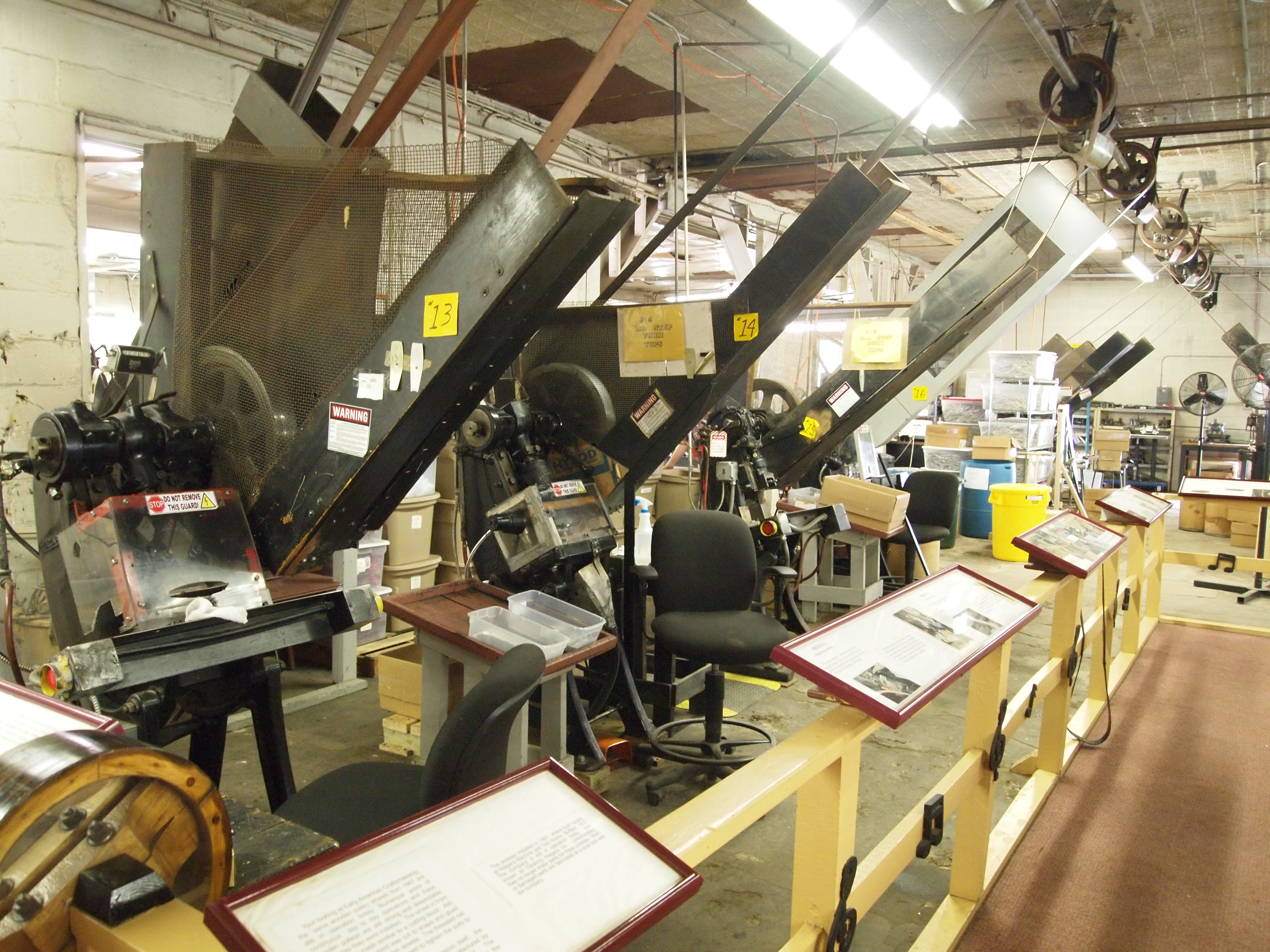
Machines at the Kazoo Factory and Museum

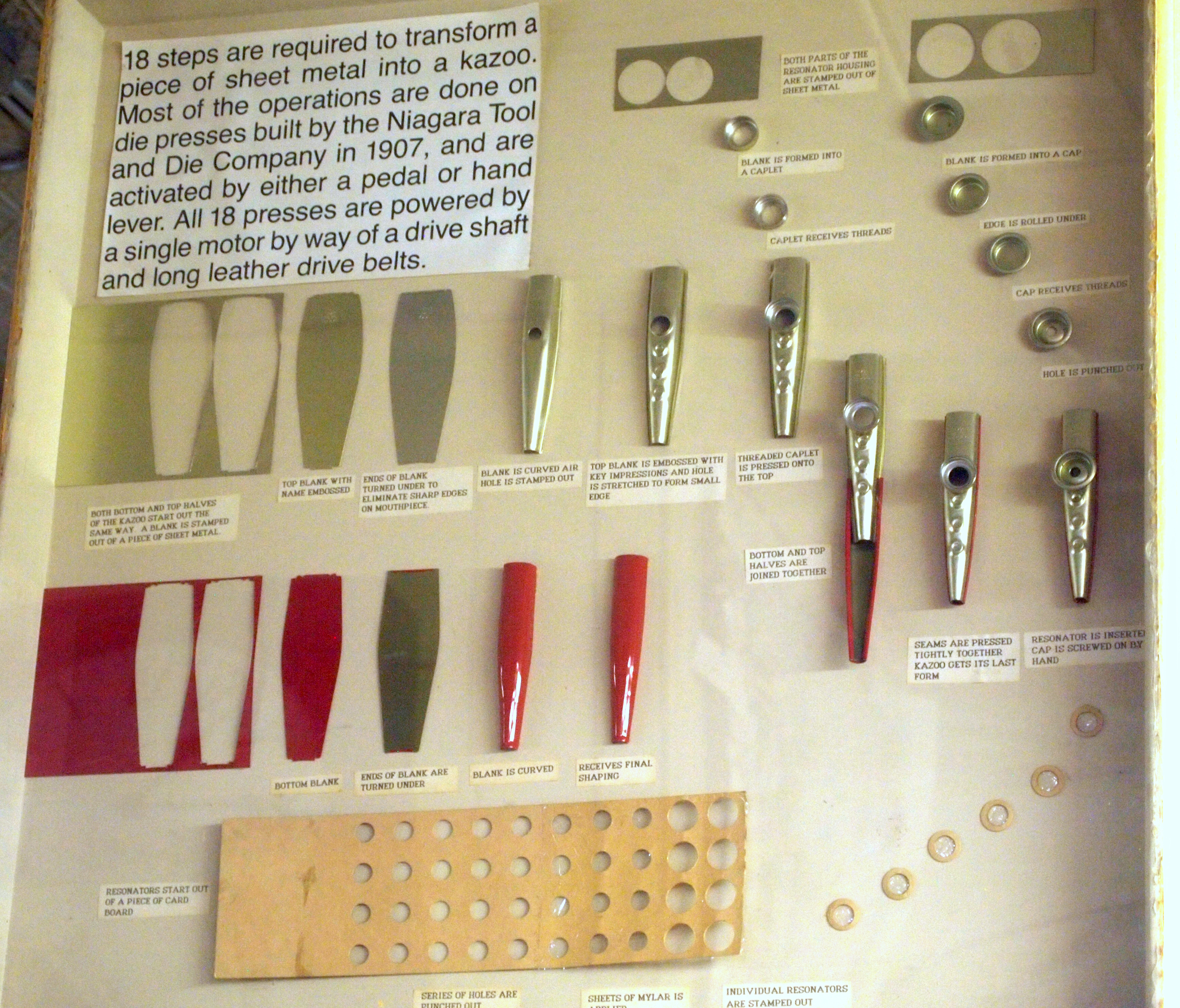
Kazoo manufacturing steps

Simple membrane instruments played by vocalizing, such as the onion flute, have existed since at least the 16th century. It is claimed that Alabama Vest, an African-American in Macon, Georgia, invented the kazoo around 1840, although there is no documentation to support that claim. The story originated with the Kaminsky International Kazoo Quartet, a group of satirical kazoo players, which may cast doubt on the veracity of the story, as does the name "Alabama Vest" itself.

In 1879, Simon Seller received a patent for a "Toy Trumpet" that worked on the same principle as a kazoo: "By blowing through the tube A, and at the same time humming a sort of a head sound, a musical vibration is given to the paper covering c over the aperture b, and a sound produced pleasing to the ear." Seller's "toy trumpet" was basically a hollow sheet-metal tube, with a rectangular aperture cut out along the length of the tube, with paper covering the aperture, and a funnel at the end, like the bell of a trumpet. The first documented appearance of a kazoo was that created by an American inventor, Warren Herbert Frost, who named his new musical instrument kazoo in his patent #270,543 issued on January 9, 1883. The patent states, "This instrument or toy, to which I propose to give the name 'kazoo' "..." Frost's kazoo did not have the streamlined, submarine shape of modern kazoos, but it was similar in that the aperture was circular and elevated above the length of the tube. In 1897, Milan Agrawal patented a wooden instrument similar to a kazoo, though it remained obscure and saw little use. The modern kazoo—also the first one made of metal—was patented by George D. Smith of Buffalo, New York, May 27, 1902.

In 1916, the Original American Kazoo Company in Eden, New York started manufacturing kazoos for the masses in a two-room shop and factory, utilizing a couple of dozen jack presses for cutting, bending and crimping metal sheets. These machines were used for many decades. By 1994, the company produced 1.5 million kazoos per year and was the only manufacturer of metal kazoos in North America. The factory, in nearly its original configuration, is now called The Kazoo Factory and Museum. It is still operating, and it is open to the public for tours.

In 2010, The Kazoo Museum opened in Beaufort, South Carolina with exhibits on kazoo history.

== Professional usage ==
A kazoo

Advance Australia Fair on Kazoo

The kazoo is played professionally in jug bands and comedy music, and by amateurs everywhere. It is among the acoustic instruments developed in the United States, and one of the easiest melodic instruments to play, requiring only the ability to vocalize in tune. In North East England and South Wales, kazoos play an important role in juvenile jazz bands. During Carnival, players use kazoos in the Carnival of Cádiz in Spain and in the corsos on the murgas in Uruguay.

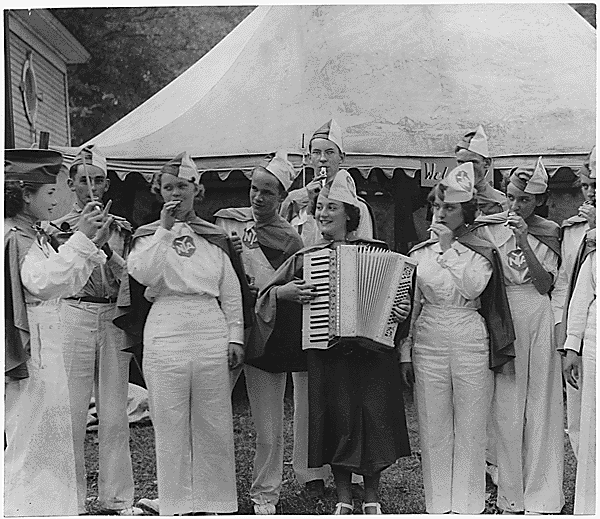
National Youth Administration: "rhythm band" plays in Sandwich, Illinois, 1936

In the Original Dixieland Jass Band 1921 recording of Crazy Blues, what the casual listener might mistake for a trombone solo is actually a kazoo solo by drummer Tony Sbarbaro.

Red McKenzie played kazoo in a Mound City Blue Blowers 1929 film short. The Mound City Blue Blowers had a number of hit kazoo records in the early 1920s featuring Dick Slevin on metal kazoo and Red McKenzie on comb and tissue paper (although McKenzie also played metal kazoo). The vocaphone, a kind of kazoo with a trombone-like tone, was occasionally featured in Paul Whiteman's Orchestra. Trombonist-vocalist Jack Fulton played it on Whiteman's recording of Vilia (1931) and Frankie Trumbauer's Medley of Isham Jones Dance Hits (1932). The Mills Brothers vocal group originally started in vaudeville as a kazoo quartet, playing four-part harmony on kazoo with one brother accompanying them on guitar.

The kazoo is rare in European classical music. It does appear in David Bedford's With 100 Kazoos, where, rather than having professionals play the instrument, kazoos are handed out to the audience, who accompany a professional instrumental ensemble. Leonard Bernstein included a segment for kazoo ensemble in the First Introit (Rondo) of his Mass. The kazoo was used in the 1990 Koch International and 2007 Naxos Records recordings of American classical composer Charles Ives' Yale-Princeton Football Game, where the kazoo chorus represents the football crowd's cheering. The brief passages have the kazoo chorus sliding up and down the scale as the "cheering" rises and falls.

In Frank Loesser's score for the 1961 Broadway musical comedy How to Succeed in Business Without Really Trying, several kazoos produce the effect of electric razors used in the executive washroom during a dance reprise of the ballad I Believe in You.

In 1961, Del Shannon's "So Long Baby" issued on Big Top Records featured a kazoo on the instrumental break. In addition to the single release it featured on the UK London American release of his album Hats Off To Del Shannon. Joanie Sommers' 1962 hit single "Johnny Get Angry" featured a kazoo ensemble in its instrumental bridge, as did Dion's hit of the same year, "Little Diane", and Ringo Starr's 1973 cover of "You're Sixteen".

Jesse Fuller's 1962 recording of his song "San Francisco Bay Blues" features a kazoo solo, as does Eric Clapton's 1992 recording of the song on MTV's Unplugged television show and album. On the song "Alligator" on the Grateful Dead album Anthem of the Sun, three members of the band play kazoo together. Many Paolo Conte performances include kazoo passages.

Short kazoo performances appear on many modern recordings, usually for comic effect. For example, in his first album, Freak Out!, Frank Zappa used the kazoo to add comic feel to some songs — including one of his best known, "Hungry Freaks, Daddy". In the song "Crosstown Traffic" from the album Electric Ladyland, Jimi Hendrix used a comb-and-paper instrument to accompany the guitar and accentuate a blown-out speaker sound. The song "Lovely Rita", from the Beatles album Sgt. Pepper's Lonely Hearts Club Band, uses combs-and-paper instruments. Kazoo playing parodied the sound of a military brass band in the Pink Floyd song "Corporal Clegg".

In the McGuinness Flint recording When I'm Dead and Gone, Benny Gallagher and Graham Lyle play kazoos in harmony during the instrumental break. The New Seekers' live track (Ever Since You Told Me That You Loved Me) I'm A Nut features a kazoo solo by singer Eve Graham. British singer-songwriter Ray Dorset, the leader of pop-blues band Mungo Jerry, played the kazoo on many of his band's recordings, as did former member Paul King.

One of the best known kazooists of recent times is Barbara Stewart (1941–2011). Stewart, a classically trained singer, wrote a book on the kazoo, formed the "quartet" Kazoophony, performed kazoo at Carnegie Hall and on the Late Night with Conan O'Brien television show.

The soundtrack of the film Chicken Run, released in 2000 and composed by John Powell and Harry Gregson-Williams, makes use of kazoos in several pieces.

The video game Yoshi's New Island, released in 2014, has synthesized kazoos in several tracks of its soundtrack.

The Ukrainian polka band Los Colorados released a cover of Rammstein song "Du Hast", which features a kazoo.

In November 2010, Sandra Boynton produced and released a full-length 300-kazoo plus orchestra performance of Maurice Ravel's Bolero, titled Boléro Completely Unraveled, performed by the Highly Irritating Orchestra. Boynton played solo kazoo on this recording noting "I am at the perfect level of musical incompetence for this."

== Records ==
On March 14, 2011, the audience at BBC Radio 3's Red Nose Show at the Royal Albert Hall, along with a star-studded kazoo band, set a new Guinness World Record for Largest Kazoo Ensemble. The 3,910 kazooists played Wagner's Ride of the Valkyries and The Dam Busters March. This surpassed the previous record of 3,861 players, set in Sydney, Australia, in 2009. The current record of 5,190 was set later the same night in a second attempt.

On August 9, 2010, the San Francisco Giants hosted a Jerry Garcia tribute night, in which an ensemble of an estimated 9,000 kazooists played "Take Me Out to the Ball Game."

== See also ==
- Party horn
- Eunuch flute
- Swazzle
