= Swazzle =

Simple device for modifying voices

Saying "that's the way to do it" with a swazzle
Swazzle demonstration.

A swazzle (also swozzle, schwazzle or swatchel) is a device used to produce the distinctive shrill voice of Punch in a Punch and Judy show. It consists of a cotton tape "reed" kept taut between two curved strips of metal, held in the mouth of the professor (performer).

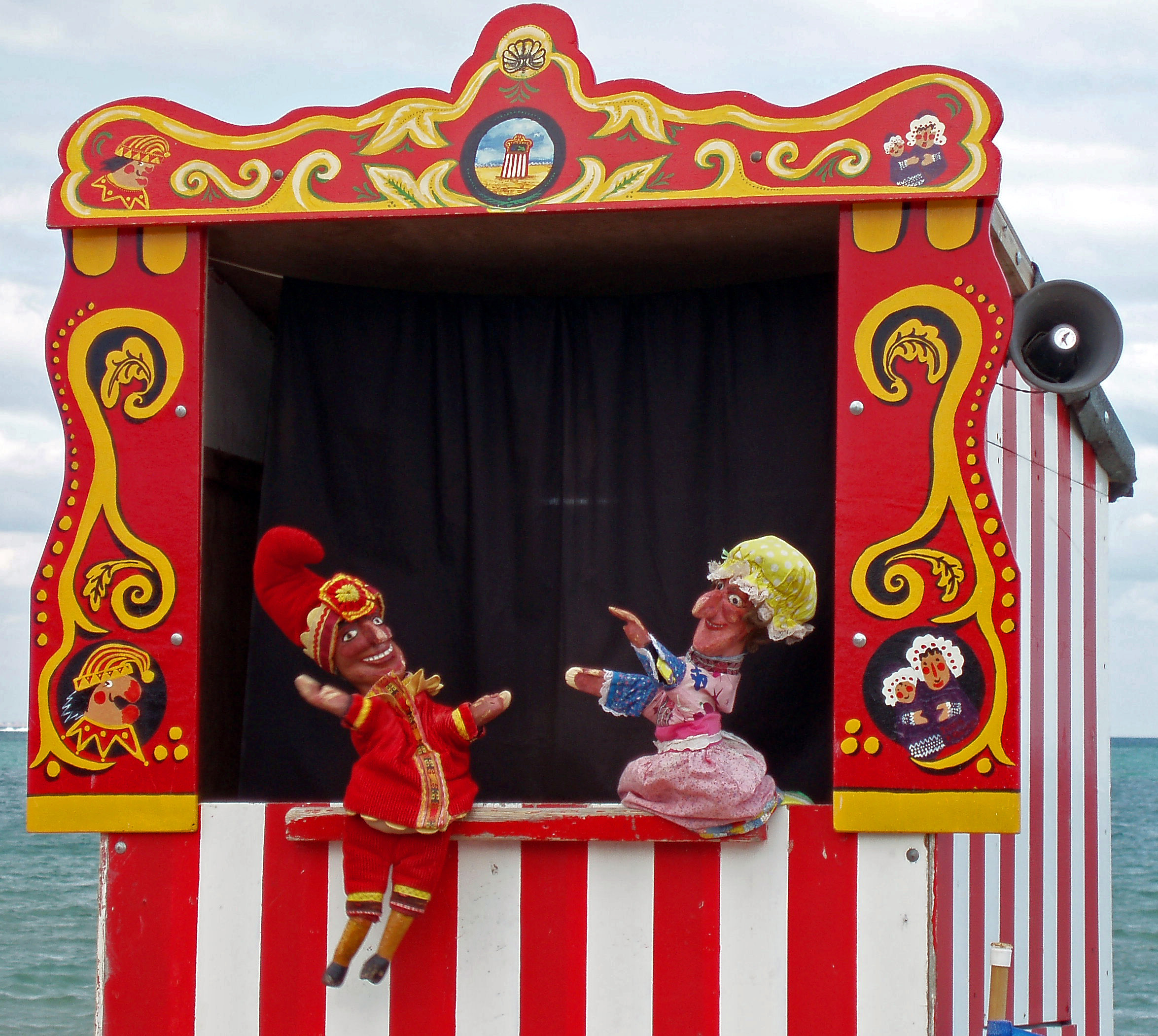
A traditional Punch and Judy booth. A swazzle was generally used by the Punch 'professor' in order to speak in Punch's characteristic voice.

The design of the swazzle was once a secret guarded by the professors and only taught to those with a genuine respect for and interest in learning the performance of Punch and Judy puppetry. The device can now be bought from joke and magic shops although those made according to the traditional design are smaller and are generally considered superior.

The swazzle must be soaked in liquor, beer, water, or saliva before use. The swazzle is positioned between the tongue and the roof of the mouth so that exhaled air passes between the two metal strips, causing the reed to vibrate and shake. Deft movements of the tongue allow the professor to move the swazzle in and out of position, allowing them to switch between voices.

== Origin ==
The name of the instrument is believed to originate from the German word "schwätzen" meaning "to chatter".

== Swallowing ==
Because the swazzle is small, positioned in the mouth and must be repeatedly moved during a performance, there is a risk that it may be swallowed while in use. In order to minimise the risk of swallowing, some professors attach a length of cotton thread to their swazzle so that it can be pulled back if it slips into the throat. In series C, episode 11 ("Carnival") of the British panel show QI, presenter Stephen Fry said that a Punch and Judy performer must accidentally swallow a swazzle at least twice before they can be considered a "professor".

== See also ==
- Eunuch flute
- Kazoo
