= Barbara Stewart (composer) =

American composer and musician

Barbara Dean Stewart (September 17, 1941 – August 5, 2011) was an American composer and musician, known for her work on the kazoo, both in those fields and as a speaker, researcher, and author. She appeared on The Tonight Show and performed at Carnegie Hall. Stewart was the founder of the group Kazoophony, and was called a "kazoo virtuoso". She was the author of The Complete How To Kazoo.
