= Cylindrical drum =

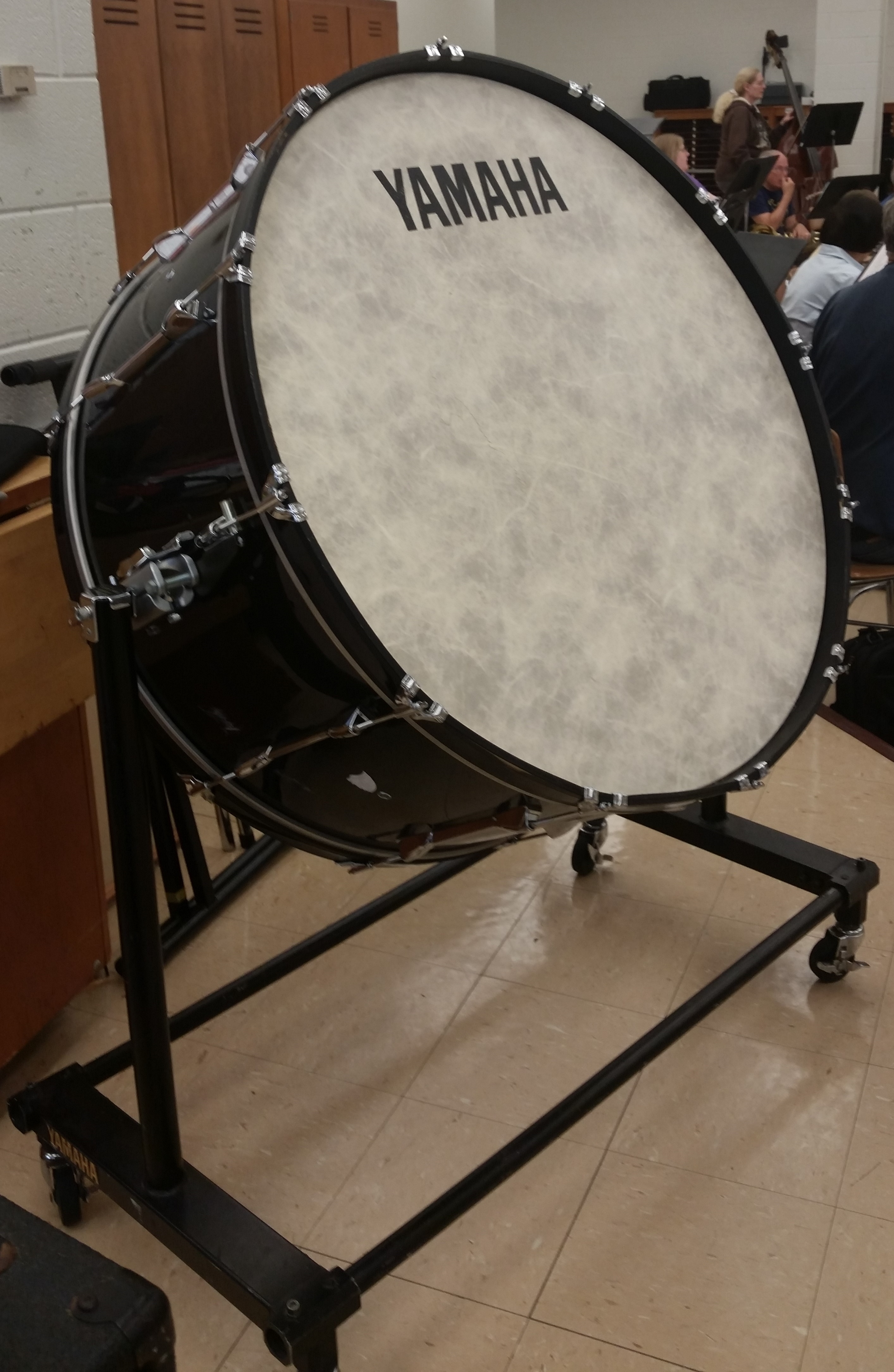
A typically mounted bass drum used for concert bands and orchestras

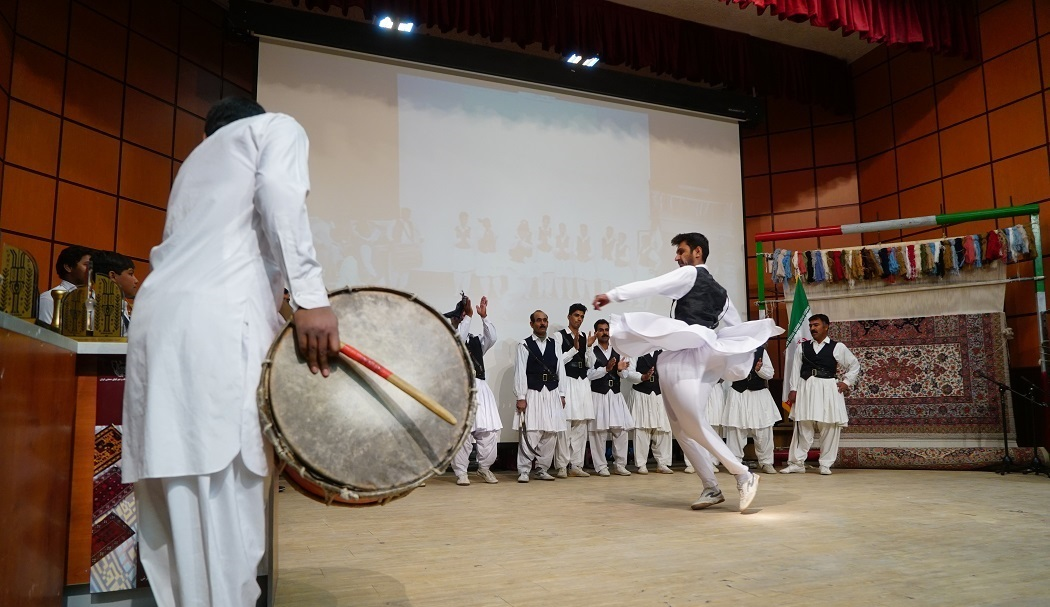
Iranian dohol drum (left)

Cylindrical drums are a category of drum instruments that include a wide range of implementations, including the bass drum and the Iranian dohol. Cylindrical drums are generally two-headed and straight-sided, and sometimes use a buzzing, percussive string.

The Iranian dohol is a famous form of cylindrical drum. Many music areas nears in the Middle East, North Africa and Central Asia include variations on the dohol and cylindrical drum forms, including the dhol of Armenia, daval of Kurdistan and the tabl ballady of Egypt. Southeastern Europe is home to cylindrical drums like the tapan of Macedonia and the dauli of Greece.
