= Membranophone =

Class of musical instruments

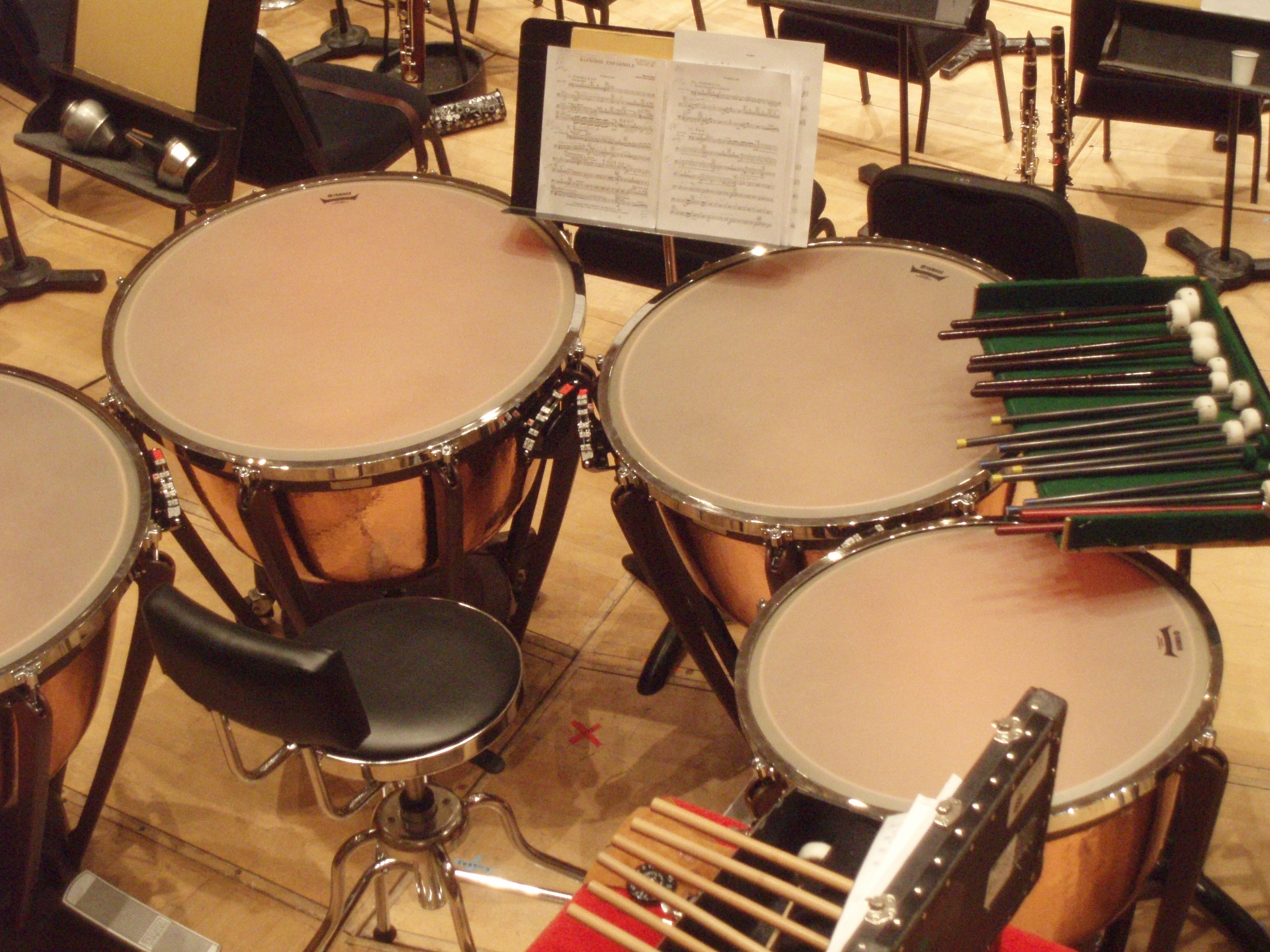
Membranophone

A membranophone is any musical instrument which produces sound primarily by way of a vibrating stretched membrane. It is one of the four main divisions of instruments in the original Hornbostel-Sachs scheme of musical instrument classification.

According to Sachs,

The sound is produced by a membrane ["skin" or "head"] stretched over an opening. Most, but not all, membranophones are generally called drums. They are classified according to material, if it's single or double headed, shape, skin(s), skin fastening, playing positions, and manner of playing.

== Hornbostel–Sachs ==
The Hornbostel–Sachs scheme of musical instrument classification divides membranophones in a numeric taxonomy based on how the sound is produced:

- 21: by hitting the drumskin with a hand or object (most common form, including the timpani and snare drum)
- 22: by pulling a knotted string attached to the drumskin (common in Indian drums, and can be considered an example of a chordophone as well)
- 23: by rubbing the drumskin with a hand or object (common in Irish traditional music, an example is the bodhran)
- 24: by modifying sounds through a vibrating membrane (unusual form, including the kazoo)

== Length and breadth ==
Membranophones can also be divided into small divisions based on length and breadth of sound production:

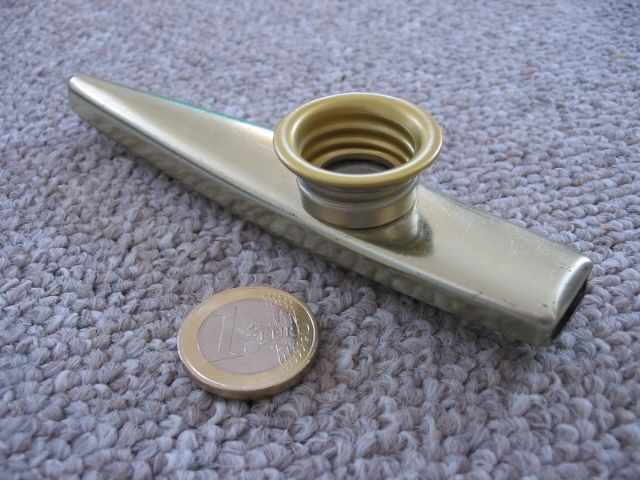
Mirlitons, as the kazoo in the picture, are a special class of membranophone, and is the only class that does not consist of true drums

- Tubular drums include a wide range of drum shapes all conforming to a "tube" shape, or generally, having a depth greater than the radius of the membrane. The Hornbostel-Sachs Classification defines 8 subcategories of tubular drums: Cylindrical, Barrel-Shaped, Double-Conical, Hourglass-Shaped, Conical, Goblet-Shaped, Cylindro-Conical, and Vase-Shaped drums.
- Mirlitons, Kazoos and Swazzles vibrate in sympathy with sounds travelling across a membrane. These are the only membranophones that are not truly drums.

SIL International maintains a classification system based largely on shape:

- Cylindrical drums are straight-sided, and generally two-headed. A buzzing, percussive string is sometimes used. Examples include the bass drum and the Iranian dohol.
- Conical drums are sloped on the sides, and are usually one-headed. Examples include the South Asian tabla and the Venezuelan chimbangueles.

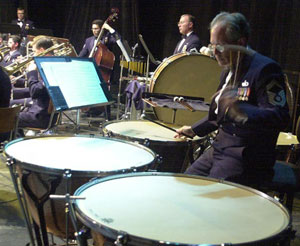
A timpani is a kind of kettle drum

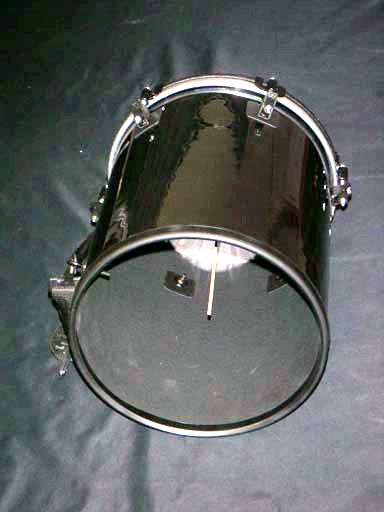
A cuica is a kind of friction drum

- Barrel drums are normally one-headed, and may be open at the bottom. They bulge in the middle. Examples include the Dhak from eastern parts of India, bendre, made by the Mossi of Burkina Faso out of a large calabash, and the trong chau of Vietnam.
- Hourglass drums (or waisted drums) are hourglass-shaped and generally two-headed. The drumheads are laced onto the body, and the laces may be squeezed during performance to alter the drum's pitch. Examples include folk drums in India (like the damaru) and much of Africa, as well as some talking drums.
- Goblet drums (or chalice drums) are one-headed and goblet shaped, and are usually open at the bottom. Examples include the Egyptian darbuka, West-African djembe, and the Arab darabukka.
- Footed drums are single-headed and are held above the ground by feet. The space between the drum and the ground provides extra resonance. Examples include a range of East African and Polynesian drums.
- Long drums are a diverse category, characterized by extreme length. Examples include the single-headed hollow tree trunk drums of Africa and the ornately carved and dyed gufalo of the Nuna in Burkina Faso.
- Kettle drums (or pot drums or vessel drums) are frequently played in pairs, and have a vessel or pot body, are one-headed and usually tuned to a specific note. Examples include the timpani and the tabla.
- Frame drums are composed of one or more membranes stretched across a frame. Examples include the tambourine and bodhrán.
- Friction drums produce sound through friction, such as by rubbing a hand or object against the drumskin. Examples include the Brazilian cuica and the Spanish zambomba.
- Mirlitons, Kazoos and Swazzles produce sound by blowing air across a membrane.

== Traditional classifications ==
The traditional classification of Indian instruments includes two categories of percussion.

- Ghan: Percussion without membranes, such as chimes, bells and gongs
- Avanaddh: Percussion with membranes, such as drums with skin heads

== Other categories ==
The predrum category consists of simple drum-like percussion instruments. These include the ground drum, which, in its most common §—Form, consists of an animal skin stretched over a hole in the ground, and the pot drum, made from a simple pot.

Water drums are also sometimes treated as a distinct category of membranophone. Common in Native American music and the music of Africa, water drums are characterized by a unique sound caused by filling the drum with some amount of water.

The talking drum is an important category of West African membranophone, characterized by the use of varying tones to "talk". Talking drums are used to communicate across distances.

Military drums or war drums are drums in various forms that have been used in the military.

== See also ==
- Bongo drum
- Semispherical drum
- Vibration of a circular membrane
