= Pandero jarocho =

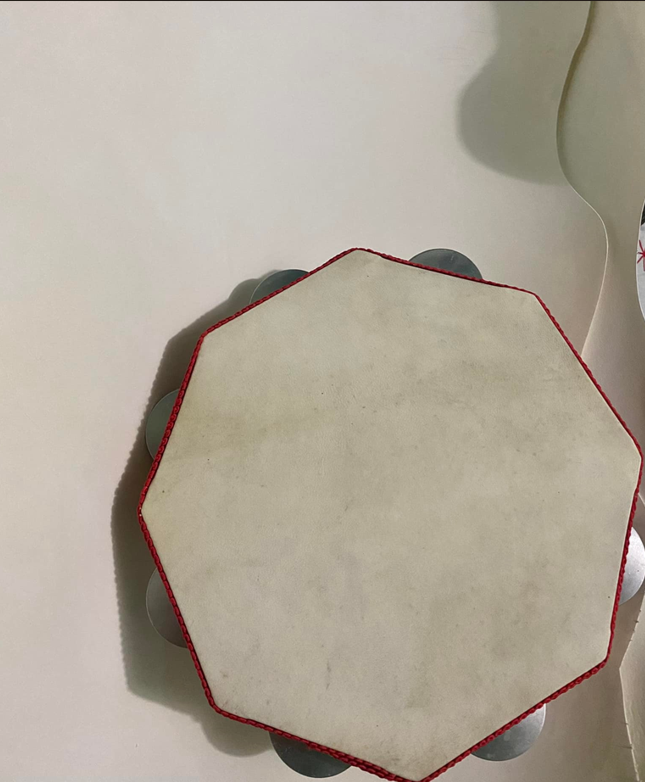
- Hornbostel–Sachs classification: 233.311-92 (Hand friction drums; Hand instruments in which the membrane is rubbed by hand, in which the body is a frame glued or nailed to the frame.)

The pandero jarocho is an octagonal tambourine or pandero traditionally played by men in the Veracruz region of Mexico. The instrument may also be played by both men and women in school music groups.

It has a wooden frame with leather stretched across and metal jingles. Instruments may be as large as 13 inches in diameter, and may be "circular or some geometric shape."

The instrument is sounded through "direct striking" with the thumb or fingers or through "friction...sliding and pressing the skin."

== Gallery ==
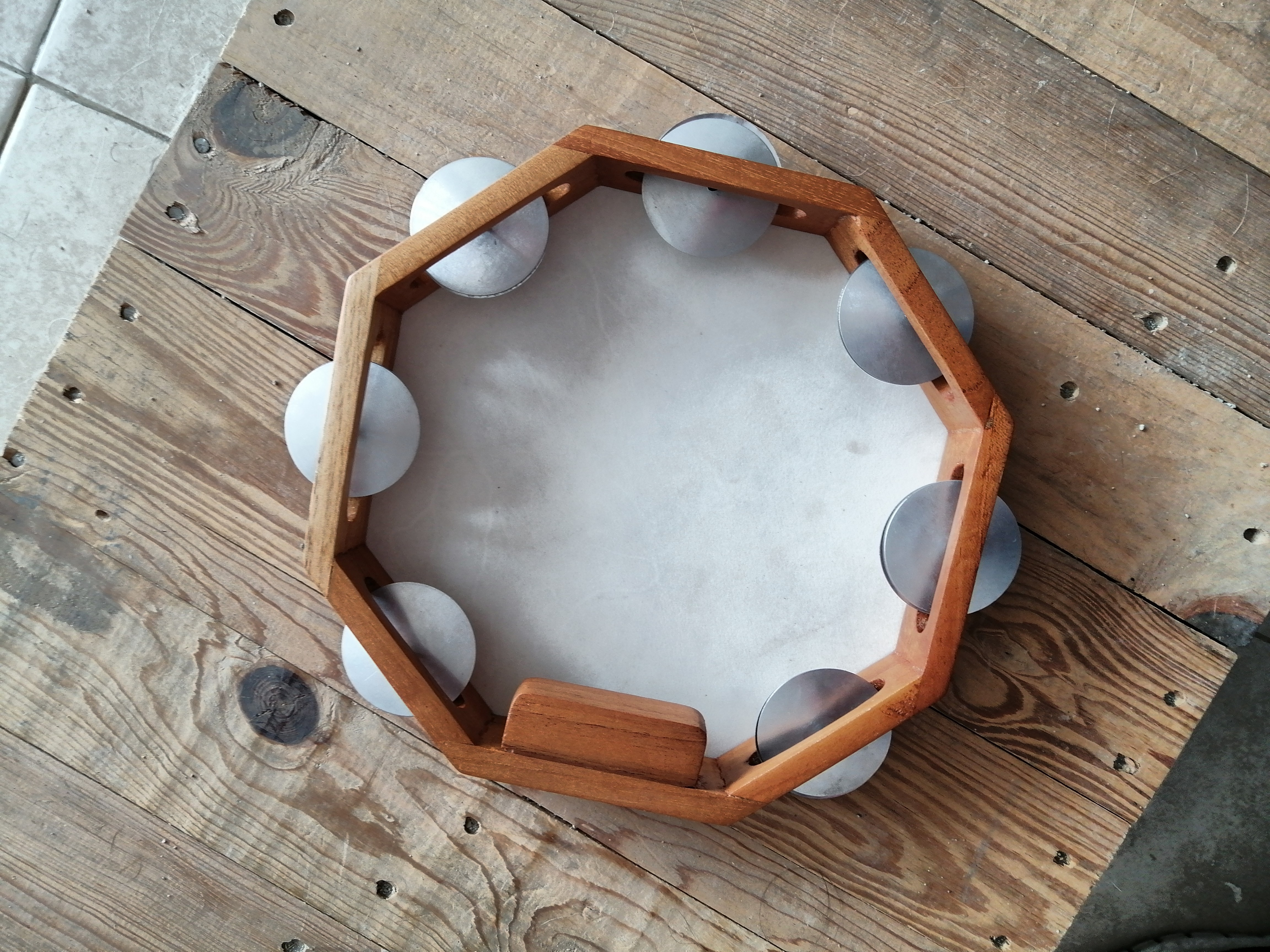

== See also ==
- Adufe, medieval frame drum
- Frame drum
- Pandeiro, variant specific to Brazil.
- Pandero
