= Frame drum =

Musical instrument

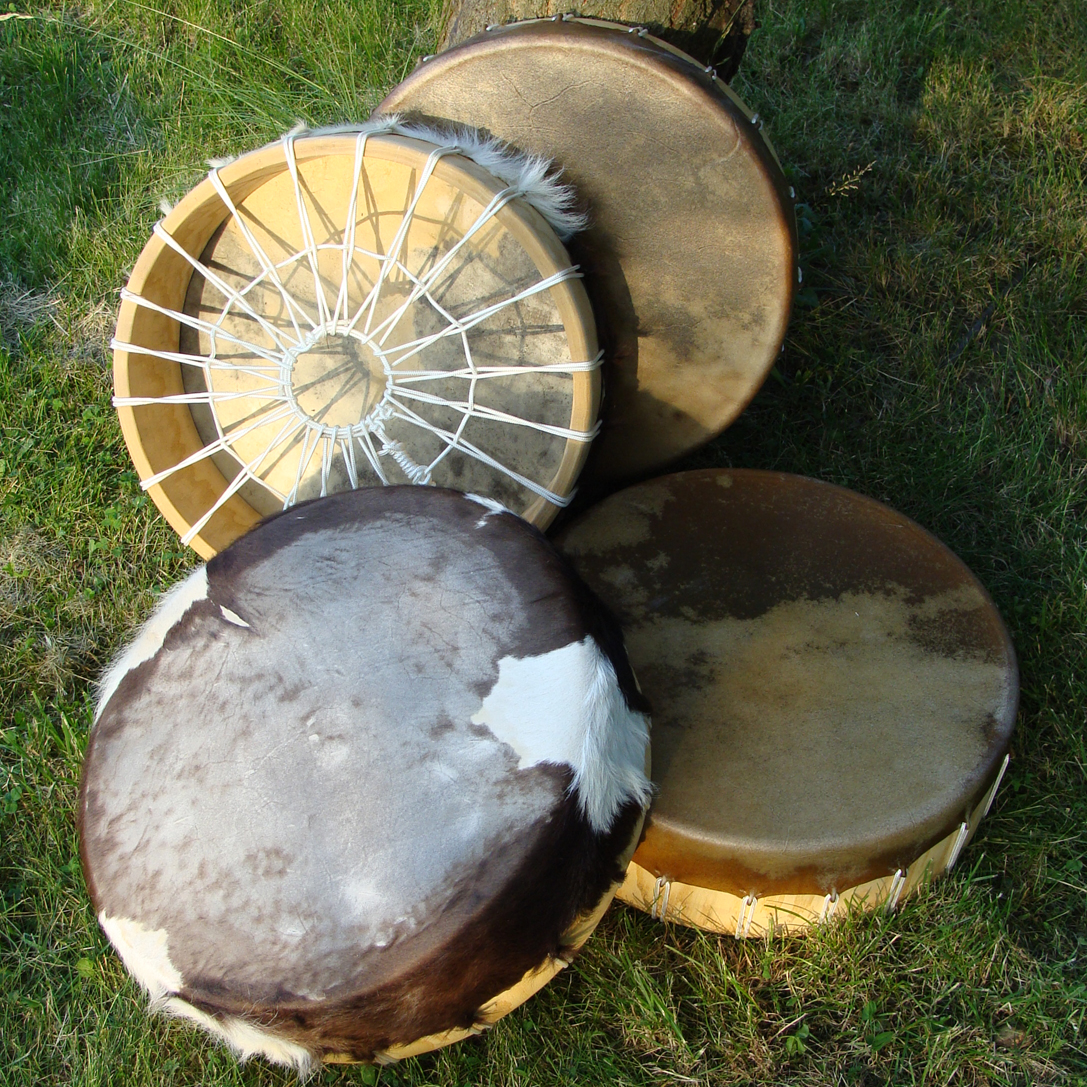
- Different frame drums
- Hornbostel–Sachs classification: 211.3 (Membranophone)

Musicians
- G. Harishankar; Layne Redmond; Glen Velez; Zohar Fresco

A frame drum is a drum that has a drumhead width greater than its shallow depth. It is one of the most ancient musical instruments. It has a single drumhead that is usually made of rawhide, but man-made materials may also be used. Some frame drums have mechanical tuning, while on many others the drumhead is tacked in place.

The drumhead is stretched over a round, wooden frame called a shell. The shell is traditionally constructed of rosewood, oak, ash etc. that has been bent and then scarf jointed together; though some are also made of plywood or man-made materials. Metal rings or jingles may also be attached to the frame.

In many cultures, larger frame drums are played mainly by men in spiritual ceremonies, while medium-size drums are played mainly by women.

The international Tamburi mundi festival in Freiburg, Germany, presents master classes and concerts featuring notable frame drum players every year.

== Types of frame drums ==
- Adufe (Portugal)
- Bendir (North Africa, Turkey)
- Bodhrán (Ireland)
- Buben (Ukraine)
- Crowdy-crawn (Cornwall)
- Cultrun (Chile, Argentina)
- Daf (Iran, Kurdistan, Azerbaijan, Turkey, Middle East)
- Daires (Greece)
- Duff, daff, daffli (India)
- Epirotiko Defi (Greece)
- Dayereh (Iran, Central Asia, Balkans)
- Dob (Hungary)
- Doyra (Uzbekistan)
- Dhyāngro (Nepal)
- Ghaval (Azerbaijan)
- Ghumat (India, Portugal)
- Gumbe (Sierra Leone, Caribbean)
- Kanjira (India)
- Lag-na (Tibet)
- Mazhar (Egypt)
- Pandeiro (Brazil)
- Pandereta plenera (Puerto Rico)
- Pandereta (tuna, rondalla, estudiantina - Spain, Philippines and Latin America)
- Pandero (Spain)
- Pandero cuequero (Chile)
- Pandero jarocho (Mexico)
- Parai (India, Sri Lanka)
- Patayani thappu (India)
- Ramana (Thailand)
- Rapa'i (Aceh, Indonesia)
- Ravann (Mauritius)
- Rebana (Southeast Asia)
- Riddle drum (England)
- Riq (Arabic world)
- Sámi drum (Nordic and Russia)
- Sakara drum (Nigeria)
- Shamanic music#Shaman's drum
- Tamborim (Brazil)
- Tambourine (Europe, USA)
- Tamboutsia (Cyprus)
- Tamburello (Italy) see tambourine
- Tammorra (Italy)
- Tar (Middle East, North Africa)
- Thappu (India)
- Tof (Israel)
- Uchiwa daiko (Japan)
- Yike (Cambodia)

== Gallery ==
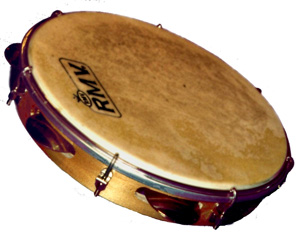
Tambourine

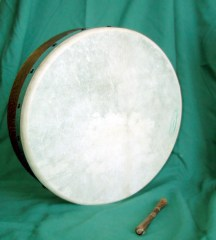
Bodhrán with cipín (tipper)

Uchiwa daiko in use on a Tokyo street

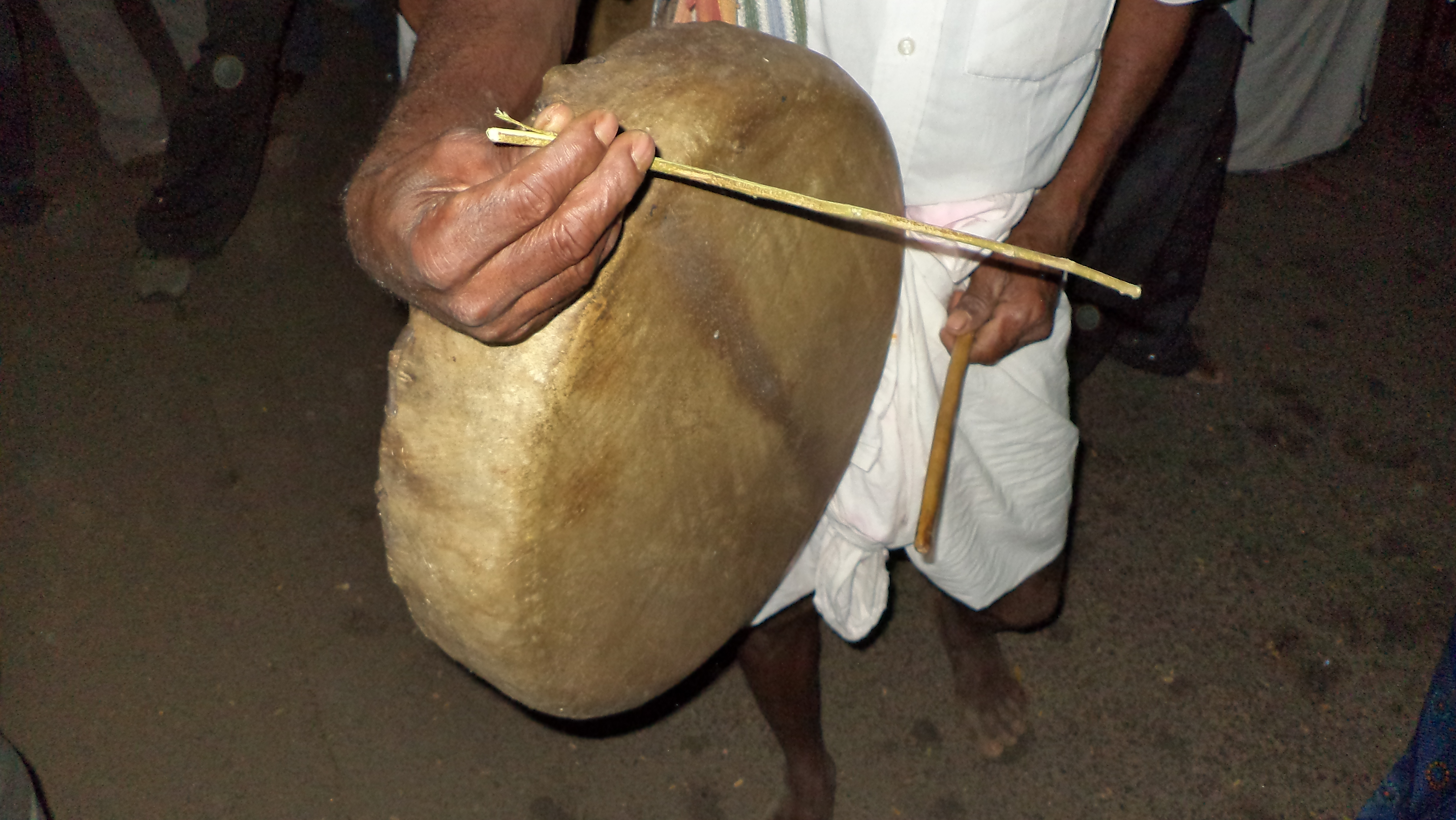
Thappu
