= Pandero =

Musical instrument of the membranophone family

Pandero from Cantabria

The pandero is a musical instrument of the membranophone family consisting of a circular frame, often made of wood or plastic, with a single head of skin stretched over it. It is played in folk music of Latin-America, Spain and Portugal. In many of these countries, when the frame has pairs of small metal jingles, it is called pandereta. In some countries, terms pandero and pandereta are interchangeable. It is played by tapping the head with fingers or palm.

== Gallery ==
Pandero from Santa Fe

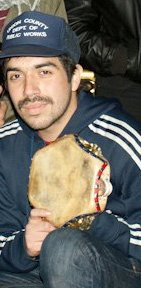
Player of Chilean pandero cuequero

== See also ==
- Adufe, medieval frame drum
- Pandeiro, variant specific to Brazil.
- Pandero jarocho, variant specific to Veracruz
