= Gumbe (drum) =

Musical instrument

Gumbé
Percussion instrument
- Other names: Bench drum
- Classification: Frame drum
- Hornbostel–Sachs classification: 211.311 (Directly struck membranophone)

The gumbé or bench drum is a frame drum found in French Guiana, Jamaica and Sierra Leone. It is small in size, has a square frame, and one goat-skin drumhead.

The gumbé was introduced in Sierra Leone in 1800 by Jamaican Maroon settlers. The ceremonial maroon music played with the gumbé gradually became a popular Creole music genre in Sierra Leone. It became known as Gumbé music and dance (named after the drum) and still exists today. Over time, it lost its specific association with Maroons and became identified with the broader Creole population of Sierra Leone.
