= Pandeiro =

Musical instrument

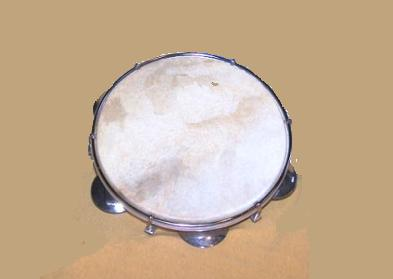

Percussion instrument
- Classification: Frame drum
- Hornbostel–Sachs classification: 211.311 (Directly struck membranophone)

3D model

The pandeiro (Portuguese pronunciation: [pɐ̃ˈdejɾu]) is a type of hand frame drum popular in Brazil. The pandeiro is used in a number of Brazilian music forms, such as samba, choro, coco, capoeira, and bossa nova music.

The drumhead is tunable, and the rim holds metal jingles (platinelas) which are cupped, creating a crisper, drier and less sustained tone on the pandeiro than on the tambourine. It is held in one hand, and struck on the head by the other hand to produce the sound. Typical pandeiro patterns are played by alternating the thumb, fingertips, heel, and palm of the hand. A pandeiro can also be shaken to make sound, or one can run a finger along the head to produce a drum roll.

== Medieval instrument ==
The term pandeiro was previously used to describe a square double-skinned frame drum, often with a bell inside; such an instrument is now known by the term adufe in Spain and Portugal.

The term pandeiro (pandero in Asturian) is still used in parts of Galicia, Asturias and Portugal to describe the square-shaped drum, while the round drum with jingles is known as pandeira in Galicia and pandeireta in Portugal.

== Players ==
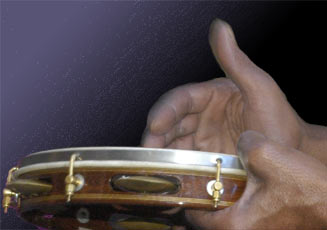
A Brazilian-style pandeiro being played

Some of the best-known pandeiro players today are Paulinho da Costa, Nanny Assis, Airto Moreira, Marcos Suzano, Cyro Baptista, Zé Maurício, and Carlinhos Pandeiro de Ouro.

Other notable pandeiro players were Scott Feiner, bringing the pandeiro to jazz, and Milt Holland, a Los Angeles–based studio percussionist and drummer who travelled the world extensively to collect and study various ethnic percussion types.

=== Non-traditional usage ===
Artists such as Stanton Moore use it non-traditionally by tuning it low to sound like a bass drum with jingles, mounting it on a stand and integrating it into the modern drum kit. Others, such as Sule Greg Wilson on the Carolina Chocolate Drops album Genuine Negro Jig, use it in tandem with a tunable bodhran—also mounted—and play them as a pair with brushes to create drum kit effects, as well as their original intent as hand-held instruments.
