= Cardio drumming =

Form of exercise using drumming movements

Cardio drumming

Cardio drumming is a form of exercise that utilizes drumming movements. It can be practiced by nearly all individuals and does not require drumming experience. The exercise involves using drumsticks to hit an exercise ball placed on a bucket, while listening to upbeat music. Cardio drumming can be done in nearly any location, such as at home, in a gym, or in a group class.

== History ==
The popularity of cardio drumming may have been inspired from different sources. Dr. Michelle Unrau, a scientist and an educator in the fitness industry since the 1990s, was traveling in Japan and recognized the potential of using drumming as aerobic exercise when she saw how people were playing Japanese drums called taiko. In 2002, she developed the TaikoFit Program.

Drummers had been using drumming as a warm-up exercise before gigs and concerts as it has been demonstrated to be physically demanding.

Cardio drumming may have also evolved from a program known as "Drums Alive!" that was developed in Germany in 2001 by Carrie Ekins. The program was a collaborated with several academic institutions including Chemnitz University of Technology, Southern Connecticut State University, Texas State University, University of Arkansas for Medical Sciences, Oxford Brookes University, and the University of Kentucky. Since then, it has gained popularity as a fitness trend.

== Description ==
Cardio drumming is a dynamic cardiovascular workout that combines drumming, rhythm, and music. Participants typically use drumsticks to hit an exercise ball placed on a bucket, following the rhythm of the music. The exercise can also incorporate dance moves and steps, enhancing the overall experience. Additional movements, such as lunges and jumping jacks can also be added. It is a low-impact workout suitable for individuals of all ages and fitness levels, and can be adapted to accommodate those with injuries or limitations. A session may involve a warm-up period, a main workout period, and a cool-down period. It has been described as "Zumba with a drum".

== Health benefits ==
Cardio drumming offers various health benefits. Regular participation in cardio drumming can improve cardiovascular health, lower blood pressure, reduce stress and anxiety, increase strength and endurance, strengthen the immune system, and improve coordination. It helps improve motor skills and hand-eye coordination and can provide relief for certain health conditions. Moreover, cardio drumming can be an alternative to traditional gym workouts.

Research has shown that intense drumming during cardio drumming sessions can burn up to 900 calories per session, making it an effective option for weight loss. It can provide a full-body workout. The exercise has also been shown to improve balance, coordination, and concentration. It promotes a sense of community and can be enjoyed by people of all ages, including older adults and children.
