= Carlinhos Pandeiro de Ouro =

Brazilian musician

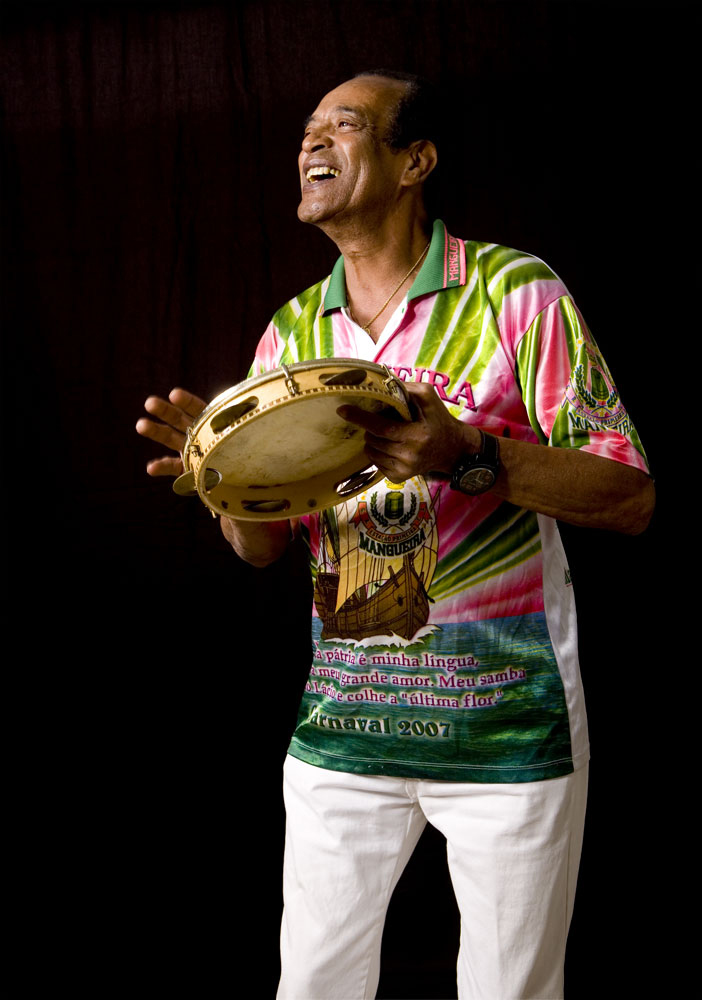
- Carlinhos Pandeiro de Ouro

Background information
- Birth name: Carlos de Oliveira
- Instrument: Pandeiro

Carlos de Oliveira, better known as Carlinhos Pandeiro de Ouro, is a Brazilian percussionist best known for playing the pandeiro, a tunable tambourine, played with a different technique than in North American music, and is one of the instrument's major proponents.

== Biography ==
Carlinhos grew up in Rio de Janeiro in the 1940s, and was immersed in samba. Carlinhos took up the pandeiro at age seven, starting with one of his mother's cake pans. He visited the favelas to absorb samba styles, particularly at one of the greatest samba schools, GRES Estação Primeira de Mangueira. Carlinhos would join in during rehearsals, and he soon came to the attention of singer Jamelão, who invited Carlinhos to become a performing member of Mangueira, a high honor.

Carlinhos's pandeiro playing became quite theatrical, with unprecedented juggling and stunts (known as malabarismo). Soon Carlinhos was performing professionally, working with some of the most important musicians and composers in Rio.

In 1966, Brazil held a national contest to find the country's best pandeiro player. Carlinhos out-performed 500 other players to win the first Golden Tambourine award, thereby becoming known as Carlinhos Pandeiro de Ouro. With this recognition, Carlinhos represented Brazil in performances before the Japanese royal family, the Swedish royal family, and also in a command performance for Queen Elizabeth II and Prince Philip of England.

Carlinhos has had a wide-ranging career as a percussionist, appearing in Brazilian films, on Brazilian television, and performing around the world with artists including Herbie Mann, Sergio Mendes, Sadao Watanabe, Ed Thigpen, Toots Thielemans, Martinho da Vila, Beth Carvalho, and Maria Bethânia.

Carlinhos married an American singer in 1983, moved to Hawaii, and raised a family. For the last three decades, he has led parades, performed with numerous American samba bands, and taught classic Rio-style samba to thousands of students. Today, Carlinhos lives in Los Angeles, performing nationally and teaching locally, at the 18th Street Arts Center in Santa Monica. He is a recipient of awards from the Durfee Foundation, the Alliance for California Traditional Arts, and the Department of Cultural Affairs, Los Angeles.

Carlinhos is a recipient of the 2011 National Heritage Fellowship awarded by the National Endowment for the Arts, which is the United States government's highest honor in the folk and traditional arts.

The book, How to Play Pandeiro Like Carlinhos Pandeiro de Ouro by Simon Carroll was published on March 26, 2021.
