= Ilimba drum =

Instrument

The Ilimba drum is a musical instrument from Zimbabwe. The body of the drum is made from the hard outer shell of a gourd.

== Sources ==
- Dorling Kindersley, Children's World Atlas, DK Children, 2 June 2008, ISBN 978-1405331609
