= Drum replacement =

Music production practice

Drum replacement is the practice, in modern music production, of an engineer or producer recording a live drummer and replacing (or adding to) the sound of a particular drum with a pre-recorded sample. For example, a drummer might play a beat, whereupon the engineer might then replace all of the snare hits with the sound of a hand-clap. It is considered by some to be one of the most arcane practices of the modern music production industry and is an example of the considerable influence of computers in modern music, even in genres not strictly classified as "electronic music."

== Origins ==
The practice is an extension of the recording techniques of the 1970s through to the 1980s, wherein the constant search for better or "more perfect" sound led to a variety of techniques being tested, including the extensive use of drum machines. Among these techniques was drum replacement, which was pioneered by producer Roger Nichols while in the studio with Steely Dan in the late '70s, and has grown in both popularity and complexity since. One of the most common uses of this technique is the replacing of every snare hit in a performance (which may or may not sound subjectively "good") with an "ideal" snare drum hit. Should the decision be made to use drum replacement techniques, the actual implementation of the practice usually falls to an audio engineer during the mixing stage.

== Association ==
Drum replacing is often mentioned, along with autotune, harmonizers, and advanced compressors, as being symptomatic of the "artificial nature" of modern western music by certain critics. Some critics suggest that the practice defeats the purpose of having a live drummer as opposed to a drum machine, since the result is effectively exactly the same as what a drum machine would produce if the drum machine had a custom sample recorded for it by the engineer. Others laud it as one of the subtleties of studio technique, used by engineers to give their craft more complexity in an increasingly automated world.
