= Riddle (tool) =

Large sieve

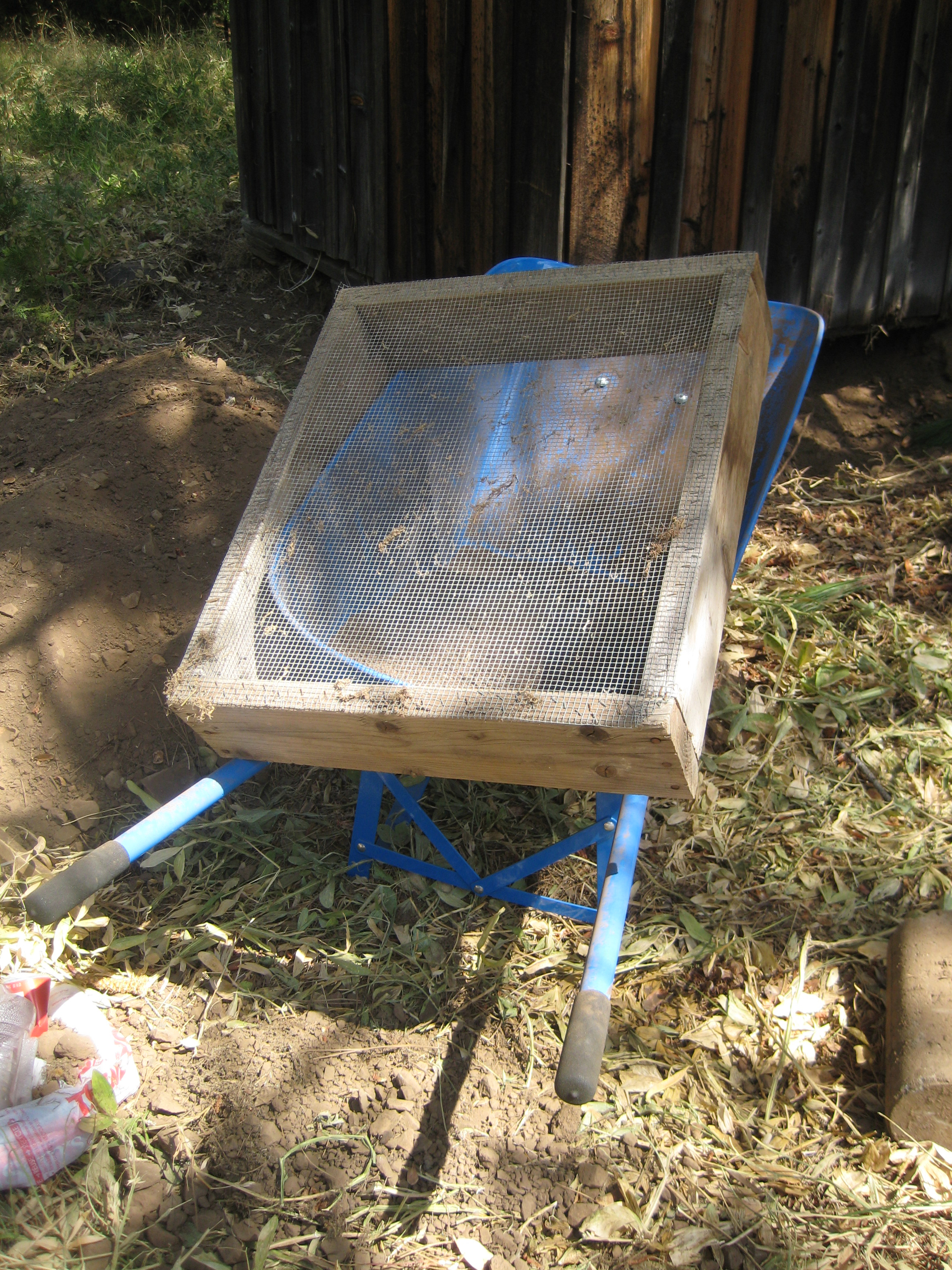
A square riddle

A riddle is a large sieve used to separate soil or compost particles, or for separating soil from vegetables.

== Etymology ==
English "riddle" is from Middle English ridelle "coarse sieve," from late Old English hriddel "sieve," altered by dissimilation from Old English hridder "sieve"

== Description ==
A riddle may be square, rectangular or circular in shape, with a rim made from wood, metal, plastic or beechwood, holding in place a steel wire mesh that may either be handwoven or machine-made. A typical circular riddle is approximately 18 inches (46 cm) in diameter and the mesh may have a spacing of something like 1 1/2 inches (3.8 cm), 1 inch (2.5 cm), 5/8 inch (1.6 cm), 1/2 inch (1.3 cm), or 3/8 inch (0.95 cm).

A riddle is typically used to improve soil quality by allowing the gardener to sieve through soil and remove stones, twigs, large lumps of clay etc. and hence provide a finer tilth. Smaller riddles can be used to separate soil very finely for seeds and early potting. Riddles may also be used to help remove soil from harvested vegetables.

== See also ==
- Garden tool
- Riddle drum
