= Riddle drum =

Musical instrument

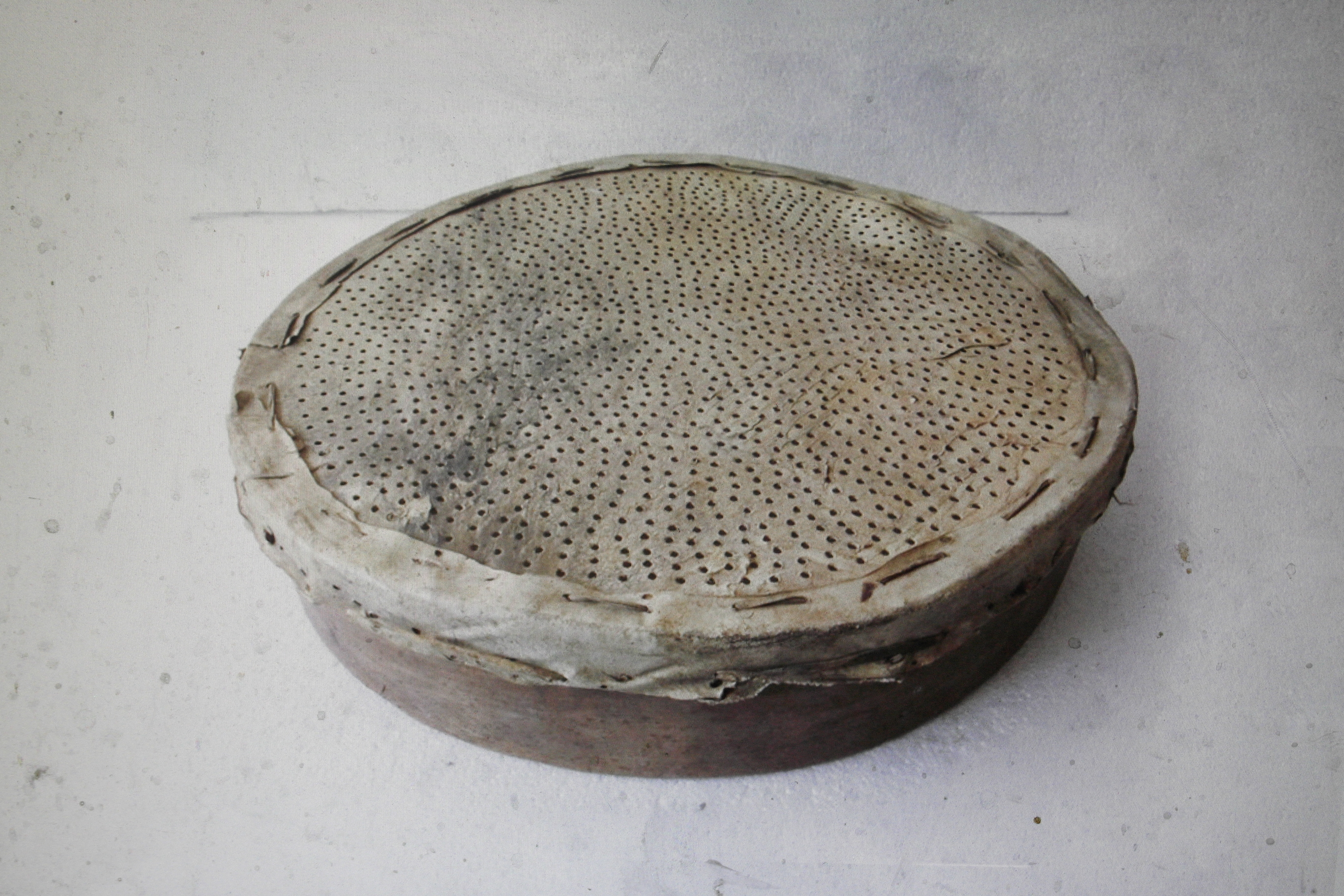
- A riddle sieve, which may be played as a drum

Percussion instrument
- Classification: Frame drum
- Hornbostel–Sachs classification: 211.311 (Directly struck membranophone)

Related instruments
- Crowdy-crawn, Bodhrán

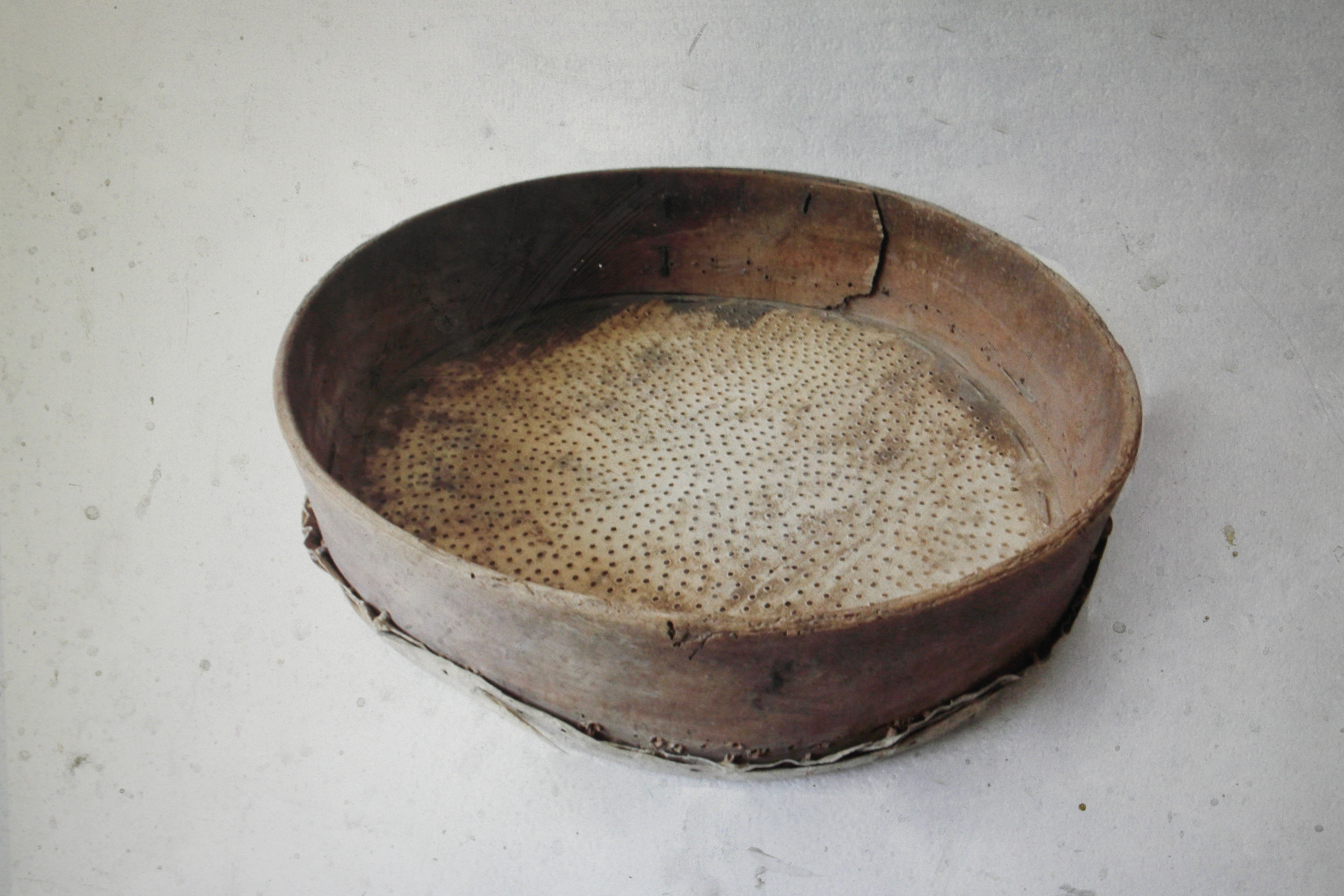
The underside of a riddle drum

A riddle drum is a makeshift frame drum used in traditional English folk music. Originally, they were large agricultural riddle sieves used for winnowing grains and kernels, made from sheepskin stretched across a wooden frame. Agricultural workers found these made excellent percussion instruments, and developed unique rhythms and playing styles.

When the name Riddle Drum was first recorded in the 1950s, the only remaining tradition of playing the drums was in the South of England. It is unknown whether the name Riddle Drum then was just a Southern English name for the drum and it was known by different names in other parts of England or whether they were once called Riddle Drum across the country.

== "Riddling" and musical parallels across the British Isles ==
The English term “riddle drum” is tied in with the agricultural process. In England, winnowing corn is colloquially called "Riddling", and until the 20th century winnowing sieves were made by stretching an animal skin across a wooden hoop. Holes were then burnt into the skin at close intervals of appropriate size for the grain(s) to be sieved (barley, wheat, corn) and were known as riddle sieves.

There are similar surviving examples of Riddle Sieves from Scotland, France, Bulgaria, the Ottoman Empire and Nepal. In some countries such as Scotland, where they were referred to as wechts or weichts, they were used as musical instruments.

In Cornwall, riddle drums were called crowdy crawn. John Davey of Zennor (1812–1891), one of the last people with some traditional knowledge of the Cornish language, describes "a wooden hoop covered with sheep-skin, used for taking up corn. Sometimes used as a tambourine, then called crowdy-crawn." “Crowdy” in the Cornish language means, "fiddle playing" and “crawn” means "animal skin".

Riddle Sieves were used in Ireland and were called, "riddles," or "English sieves". The Irish bodhrán drum is identical to the English riddle drum, also made of goatskin and sometimes associated with the "riddling" of corn.

== History and precursors ==
Riddle Drums were popular throughout Medieval Europe and are common in paintings of minstrels and troubadours. With the influence of the French language in the courts of Europe at that time, they were referred to as Tambour. However how popular this French word was among the common folk of England is unknown. Tambour also means any drum with a single skin rather than Riddle Drum specifically. Some modern makers of Riddle Drums in England market them under the name "Hylsung", based on a strong circumstantial case that this was their name in Dark Ages England; Anglo-Saxon literature mentions only one drum in use in England, called a Hylsung, but gives no description of it. However Norse literature too in Edda mentions drums called Hylsung, though again with no description of what they were. However, in Scandinavia during that period, Riddle drums were common and the only drums known to be used.

Frame drums were common across Europe until late Medieval times and were mostly played Middle Eastern style holding the drum facing forward and playing it with the fingers—percussion mallet play was less common. After the Middle Ages the riddle drum's popularity declined rapidly, as newer more sophisticated drums emerged leaving only the tambourines as their legacy. Many frames drums are illustrated in medieval paintings.

Riddle sieves were not unique to England, skin winnowing sieves were used across Europe, the Middle East and India, however no tradition of using them as musical instruments is recorded in any other country.

The first mention of an English sieve tambourine comes from John Davey of Zennor (1812–1891), the last native speaker of the Cornish language; he describes, "a wooden hoop covered with sheep-skin, used for taking up corn. Sometimes used as a tambourine, then called crowdy-crawn.". However Davey calls it a tambourine not a drum and makes no mention of playing with a stick, so he may only be talking about an antecedent to the Riddle Drum.

== Construction and technique ==
Riddle drums are the a basic form of frame drum, simply a goat skin stretched across a wooden hoop, are usually 30 cm (12”) to 48 cm (20”). Riddle Drums historically were made from a crude wooden frame and sheepskin most likely due to animal availability, while modern ones tend to use goatskin as they are more durable. They are without ornamentation.

Frame drumming has been around since Neolithic times developing across countries and regions into quite unique instruments with their own variants of drum, playing methods and rhythms. The Riddle Drum is quite distinct from other frame drums today and not musically interchangeable with them. Frame drum skins are thin and tight to create high harmonics when playing with the fingers, also frame drummers tend to play around the edges of the drum for a higher tone and a prime quality sought in a drum is lengthy resonance. Frame drumming is also quite a sophisticated form of drumming and can be difficult to learn, while Riddle Drumming is reasonably easy, so much more accessible as folk instruments than frame drums. Riddle Drum skins tend to be thicker and looser than those of frame drum giving them a bass tone, also they tend to be hit near the centre of the drum and the free hand pressed against the skin to reduce resonance. The reason the unique playing style developed is most likely because thin, tight skins would not survive the agricultural process and the other uses Riddle Sieves were put to, "filling sacks with grain, holding wool, when carded and ready for the spinning wheel, or feathers plucked three time a year".

Players employed a double-ended beater held with a pencil grip (or sometimes a leather thong). The player strikes the drum with glancing blows (sometimes with either end of the stick, as one might play a bodhrán). Stick drumming may have emerged because the stretching and wear and tear on the sieves made them unplayable with the fingers. Also the nature of traditional English music, such as jigs and hornpipes, which require a heavy accentuated beat to inform the dancers when to place their feet.

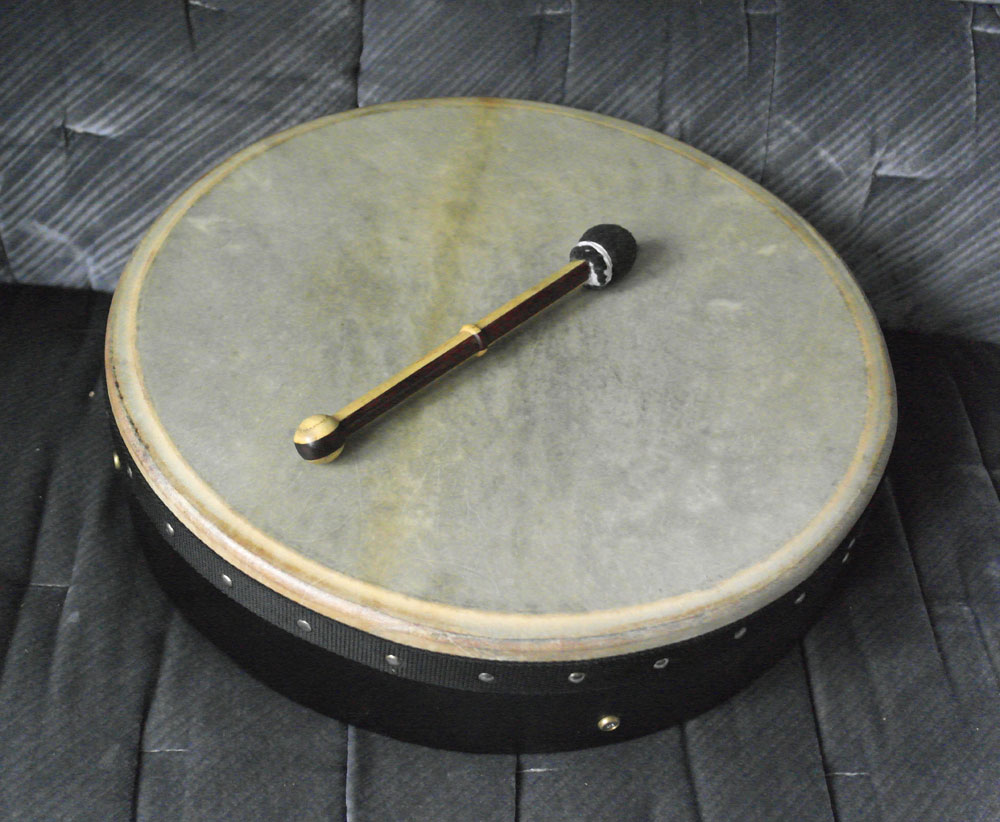
A modern riddle drum and percussion mallet

== Research and revival ==
In the 1930s, a man named Alfie Tuck from Bridport, Dorset was recorded playing a riddle drum with a stick, accompanied by a melodeon player. Tuck's drum was made of a calfskin over a large farm sieve. It was beaten with a double-ended stick, then, particularly during step-dancing, it was vibrated by wetting the thumb and running it across the head of the drum."

The folklorist Peter Kennedy encountered several Riddle Drummers in Dorset and Wiltshire in the 1950s and 60s.
