= Crowdy-crawn =

Musical instrument

Percussion instrument
- Classification: Frame drum
- Hornbostel–Sachs classification: 211.311 (Directly struck membranophone)

Related instruments
- Bodhrán, Riddle drum

A crowdy-crawn is a wooden hoop covered with sheepskin used as a percussion instrument in western Cornwall at least as early as 1880. It is similar to the Irish bodhrán. It is used by some modern Cornish traditional music groups as a solo or accompaniment instrument. The name crowdy-crawn is derived from the Cornish "kroder kroghen," literally "skin sieve," sometimes shortened to "crowd."

The crowdy-crawn is said to have originated from a tool used for gathering or measuring grain. According to one authoritative observer, the Irish bodhrán was derived from the "riddle," an agricultural tool used for sifting coarse material from harvested grain: "most [bodhráns] were made out of sieves and riddles, you know, for riddling corn, they just removed the wire, and used the frame." As a "riddle drum," the instrument is also known from Dorset and Wiltshire in England. A book on English agricultural hand tools depicts a riddle with a beech frame 28 inches in diameter from Leicestershire, England, and Scotsman Osgood Mackenzie stated that he "never saw a wire riddle for riddling corn or meal in the old days; they were all made of stretched sheep-skins with holes perforated in them by a big red-hot needle", suggesting a cosmopolitan origin for the musical instrument.

When not in use in the field, the crowdy-crawn was used to store odds and ends in homes: "In old country house-keeping in West Cornwall, odd things, all worth saving, but for which no special place on the wall, shelf, chimney board, or dresser was provided, were tidied away into the "crowdy-crawn"; a sieve-rind with a bottom of stretched sheep-skin, serving on occasion also as a tambourine for dancers, but originally meant as a corn-measure." The term is also used modernly to describe a gathering of people for Cornish cultural storytelling, lace-making, quilting, spinning and other traditional activities.

Crowdy Crawn (Sentinel, SENS 1016, 1973) is one of Brenda Wootton's albums, made in collaboration with Richard Gendall.
