= Bodhrán =

Celtic frame drum

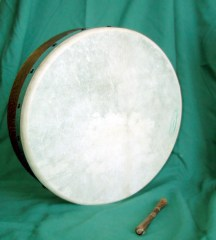
- Bodhrán with cipín (tipper)

Percussion instrument
- Classification: Percussion
- Hornbostel–Sachs classification: 211.321 (Single-skin frame drums)
- Developed: southwest Ireland either mid-19th century or ancient

Related instruments
- Tambourine

The bodhrán (/ˈbaʊrɑːn, baʊˈrɑːn, ˈbɔːrɑːn, ˈbɔːrən/; Irish: [ˈbˠəuɾˠaːnˠ]; plural bodhráin) is a frame drum used in Irish music from 25 to 65 cm (10–26 in) in diameter, with most drums measuring 35–45 cm (14–18 in). The sides of the drum are 9–20 cm (3 1/2–8 in) deep. A goatskin hide is tacked to one side (synthetic heads or other animal skins are sometimes used). The other side is open-ended for one hand to be placed against the inside of the drum head to control the pitch and timbre.

One or two crossbars, sometimes removable, may be inside the frame. Some professional modern bodhráns integrate mechanical tuning systems similar to those used on drums found in drum kits. It is usually with a hex key that the bodhrán skins are tightened or loosened depending on the atmospheric conditions.

Some notable music acts and people who have made use of the bodhrán include Christy Moore, Planxty, Moving Hearts, The Chieftains, The Boys of the Lough, The Pogues, Hothouse Flowers, Stockton's Wing, De Dannan, The Saw Doctors, Great Big Sea, Flogging Molly, Imelda May, John Joe Kelly and Ruairi Glasheen.

== History ==
Composer Seán Ó Riada declared the bodhrán to be the native drum of the ancient Celts (as did bodhrán maker Paraic McNeela), suggesting that it was possibly used originally for winnowing or wool dying, with a musical history that predated Christianity, native to southwest Ireland.

According to one authoritative observer, the Irish bodhrán was derived from the "riddle", an agricultural tool used for sifting coarse material from harvested grain: "most [bodhráns] were made out of sieves and riddles, you know, for riddling corn, they just removed the wire, and used the frame. "As a "riddle drum", the instrument is also known from Dorset and Wiltshire in England. A book on English agricultural hand tools depicts a riddle with a beech frame 28 inches in diameter from Leicestershire, England, and Scotsman Osgood Mackenzie stated that he "never saw a wire riddle for riddling corn or meal in the old days; they were all made of stretched sheep-skins with holes perforated in them by a big red-hot needle", suggesting a cosmopolitan origin for the musical instrument.

However, according to musician Ronan Nolan, former editor of Irish Music magazine, the bodhrán evolved in the mid-19th century from the tambourine, which can be heard on some Irish music recordings dating back to the 1920s. A large oil painting on canvas from 1833 by Daniel Maclise (1806–1870) depicts a Halloween house party where a tambourine-style bodhrán features clearly. It is in a group of musicians with union pipes, a fiddle, and a fife. The bodhrán is struck with the back of the player's hand, as is sometimes still done, rather than with a cipín, also known in English as a "tipper.” In remote parts of the south-west, the "poor man's tambourine" – made from farm implements and without the jingles – was in popular use among mummers, or wren boys. In the early 20th century, home-made frame drums were constructed using willow branches as frames, leather as drumheads, and pennies as jingles. Photographs and a short film taken by folklorist Kevin Danaher in Athea, County Limerick in 1946 show bodhráns with jingles being played with a ’'cipín" in a style that is relatable to that of contemporary bodhrán playing.

=== Name ===
The Gaelic word shared by Scots and Irish bodhrán (plural bodhráin), indicating a drum, is first mentioned in the Rosa Anglica, "a manuscript that was written no earlier than the 15th and no later than the 16th century, or very early in the 17th century."

Third-generation bodhrán maker Caramel Tobin suggests that the name bodhrán means "skin tray". He also suggests a link with the Irish word bodhar, meaning, among other things, a drum or a dull sound (it also means deaf). A relatively new introduction to Irish music, the bodhrán without jingles has largely supplanted its predecessor.

=== Possible antecedents ===
There is evidence of frame drums in Northern Europe from the Bronze Age (ca. 2000–1000 BC) and possibly earlier, although very few survive, as they were made of wood and skin (materials that decompose easily). Representations and partial remains have been found that suggest its use in community rituals or ceremonies. Roman sources describe the Celts as using loud, rhythmic music in their rituals and warfare (e.g., Tacitus and Diodorus Siculus).

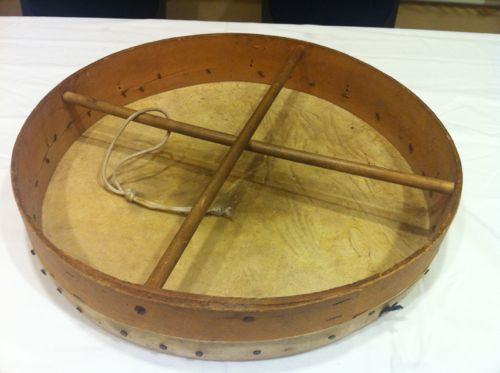
Bottom view of a bodhrán-like frame drum made in the 1960s or earlier; note scarf-joined frame.

It has also been suggested that the origin of the instrument may be the skin trays used in Ireland for carrying peat or grain; the earliest bodhrán may have simply been a skin stretched across a wood frame without any means of attachment. The Cornish frame drum crowdy-crawn, which was also used for harvesting grain, was known as early as 1880.

Peter Kennedy observed a similar instrument in Dorset and Wiltshire in the 1950s, where it was known as a "riddle drum", a riddle being a large sieve for separating soil particles from stones etc.

Dorothea Hast has stated that until the mid-twentieth century the bodhrán was mainly used as a tray for separating chaff, in baking, as a food server, and for storing food or tools. She argues that its use as musical instrument was restricted to ritual use in rural areas. She claims that while the earliest evidence of its use beyond ritual occurs in 1842, its use as a general instrument did not become widespread until the 1960s, when Seán Ó Riada used it.

=== Popularity ===
There are no known references to this particular name for a drum prior to the Rosa Anglica, "a manuscript that was written no earlier than the 15th and no later than the 16th century, or very early in the 17th century." Although various drums (played with either hands or sticks) have been used in Ireland since ancient times, the bodhrán itself did not gain wide recognition as a legitimate musical instrument until the Irish traditional music resurgence in the 1960s in which it became known through the music of Seán Ó Riada and others.

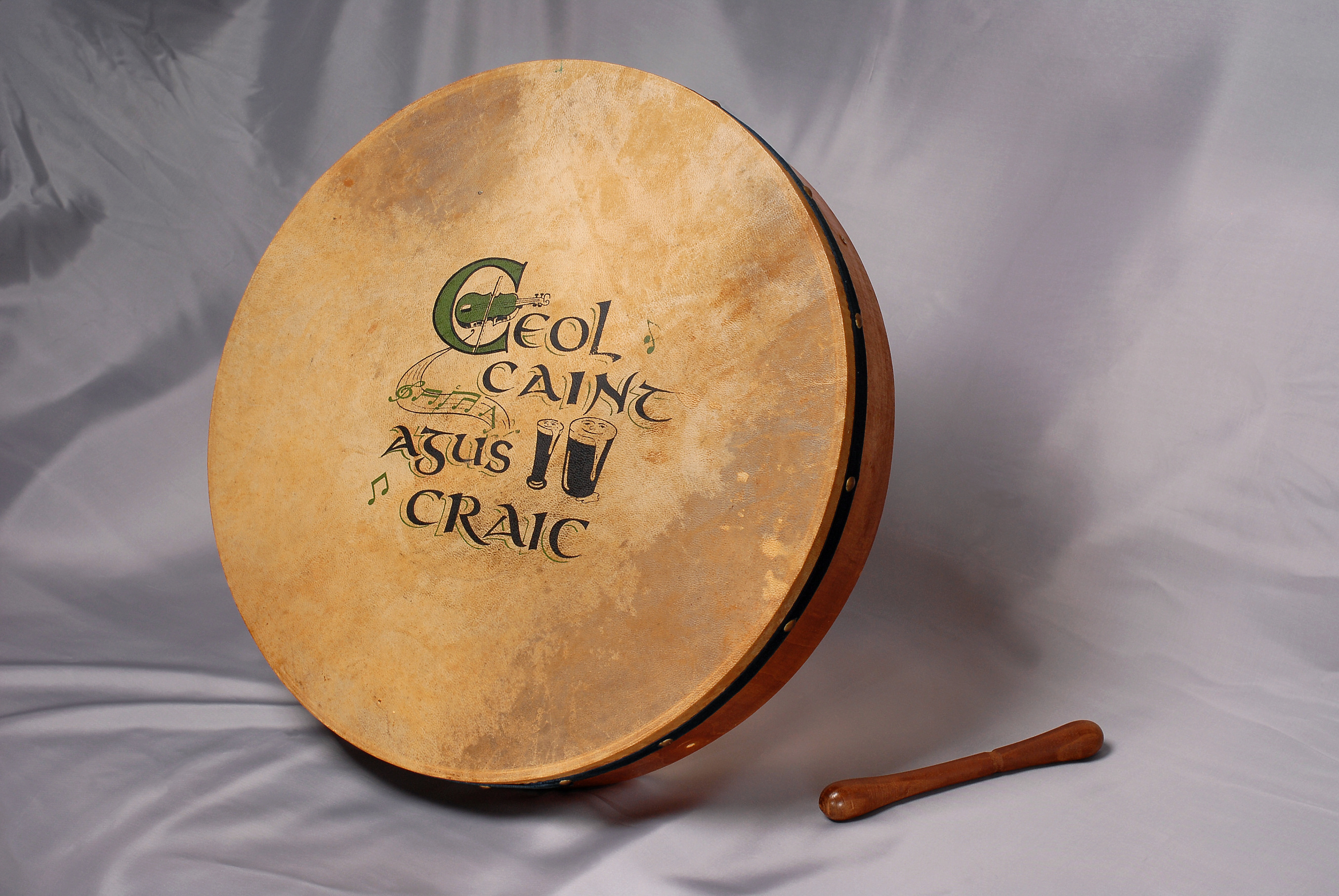
Painted Bodhrán for decoration purposes

The second wave roots revival of Irish traditional music in the 1960s and 1970s brought virtuoso bodhrán playing to the forefront, when it was further popularized by bands such as Ceoltóirí Chualann and The Chieftains. It was not featured at Fleadh Cheoil until 1973.

Growing interest led to internationally available LP recordings, at which time the bodhrán became a globally recognized instrument. In the 1970s, virtuoso players such as The Boys of the Lough's Robin Morton, The Chieftains' Peadar Mercier, Planxty's Christy Moore, Tommy Hayes of Stockton's Wing and De Dannan's Johnny "Ringo" McDonagh further developed playing techniques.

=== International use ===
Although most common in Ireland, the bodhrán has gained popularity throughout the Celtic music world, especially in Scotland, Cape Breton, North mainland Nova Scotia, Newfoundland, and Prince Edward Island. In Southern England tambourines were a popular accompaniment to traditional dance music.

In the South West of England a similar instrument made from the frame of a garden sieve was once popular and known as a Riddle Drum. In Cornish traditional music they are called a crowdy-crawn; the use of this instrument to store odds and ends led to the name also being used to mean "miscellaneous". The bodhrán has also found application within the Celtic music of Galicia, often accompanying the gaita gallega (Galician bagpipes).

== Beaters ==
The drum is struck either with the bare hand or with a lathe-turned piece of wood called a bone, tipper, beater, stick or cipín.

Tippers were originally fashioned from a double-ended knuckle bone, but are now commonly made from ash, holly, or hickory wood. Brush-ended beaters, and a "rim shot" (striking the rim) technique for contrast, were introduced by Johnny McDonagh.

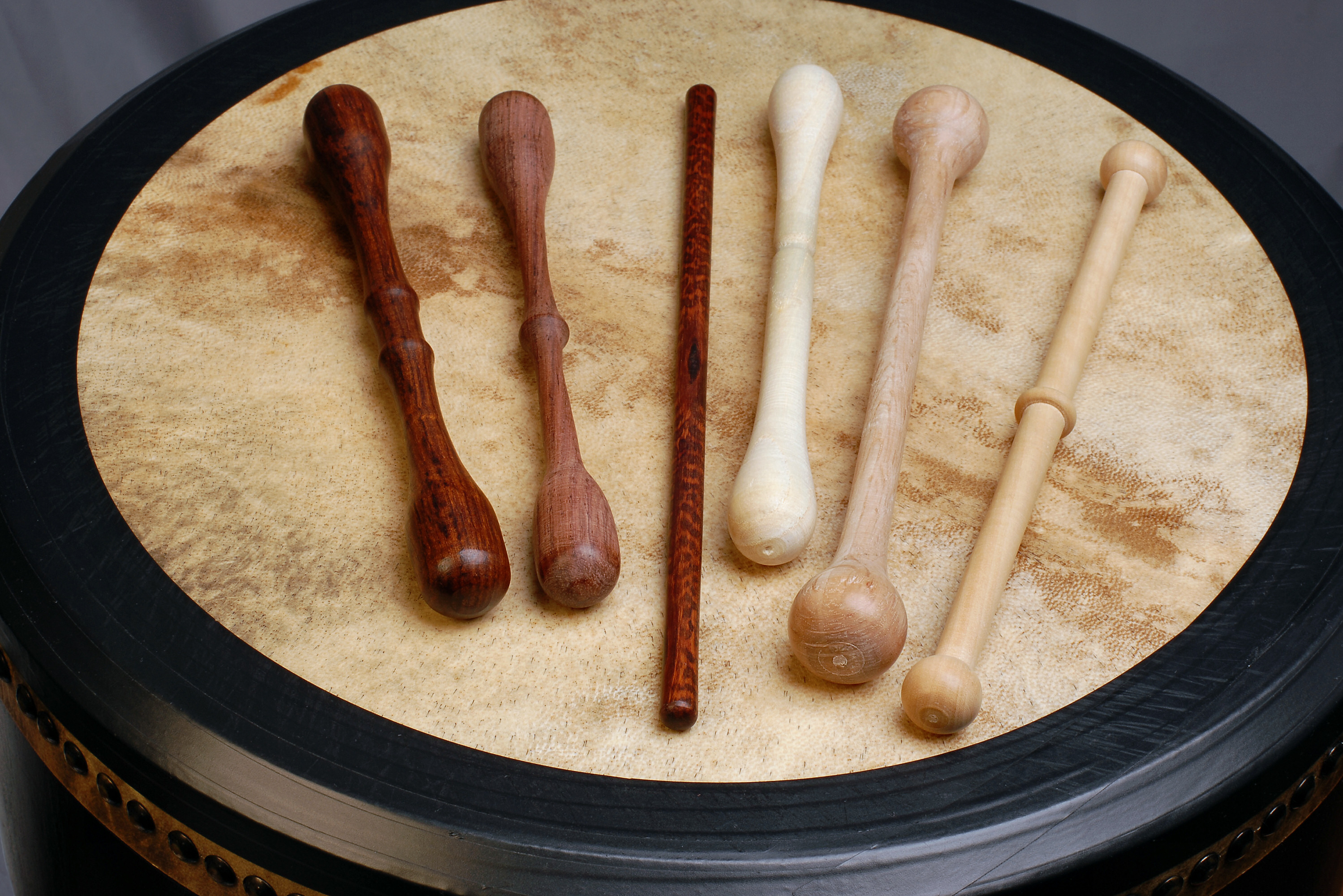
Traditional tippers

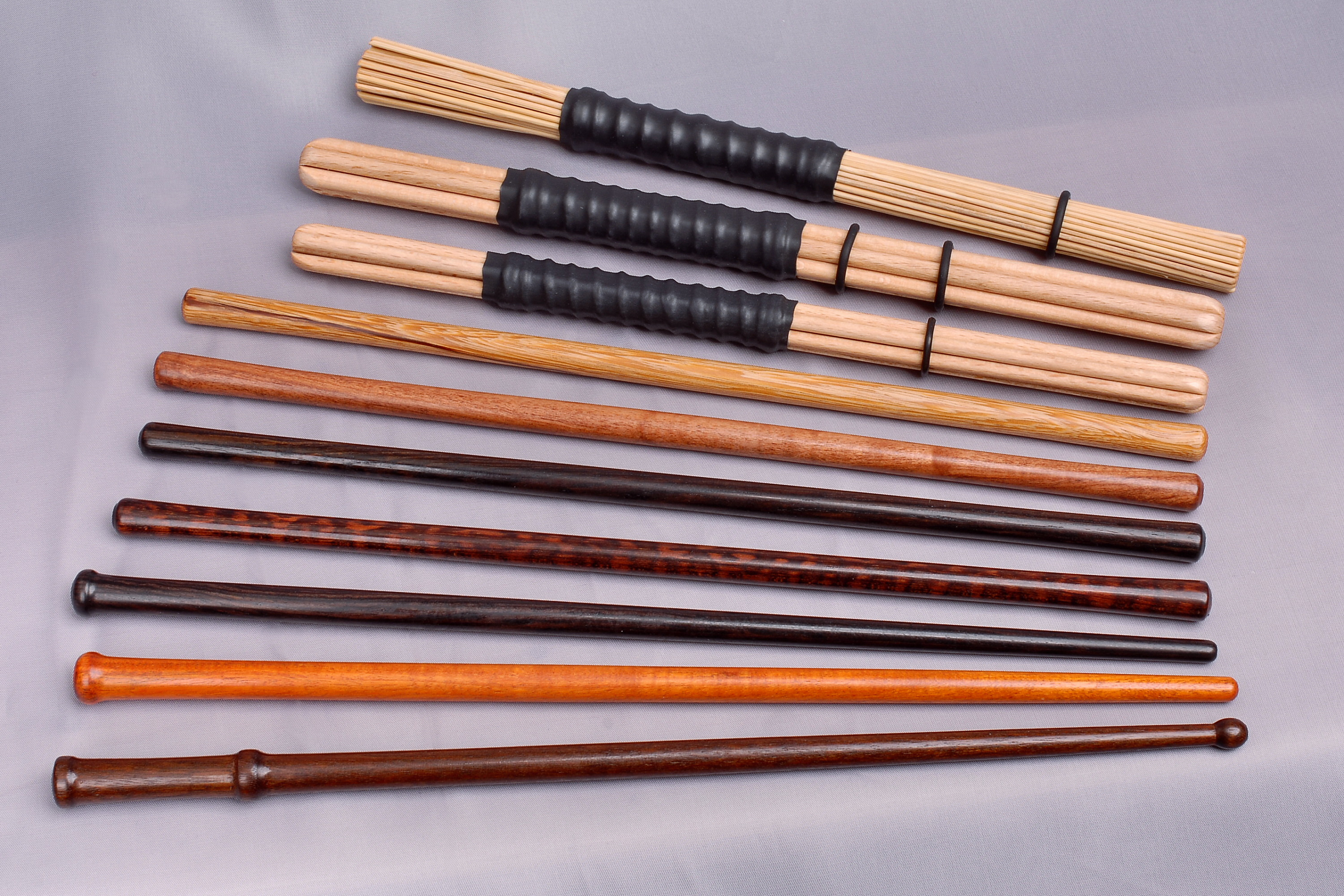
Modern tippers

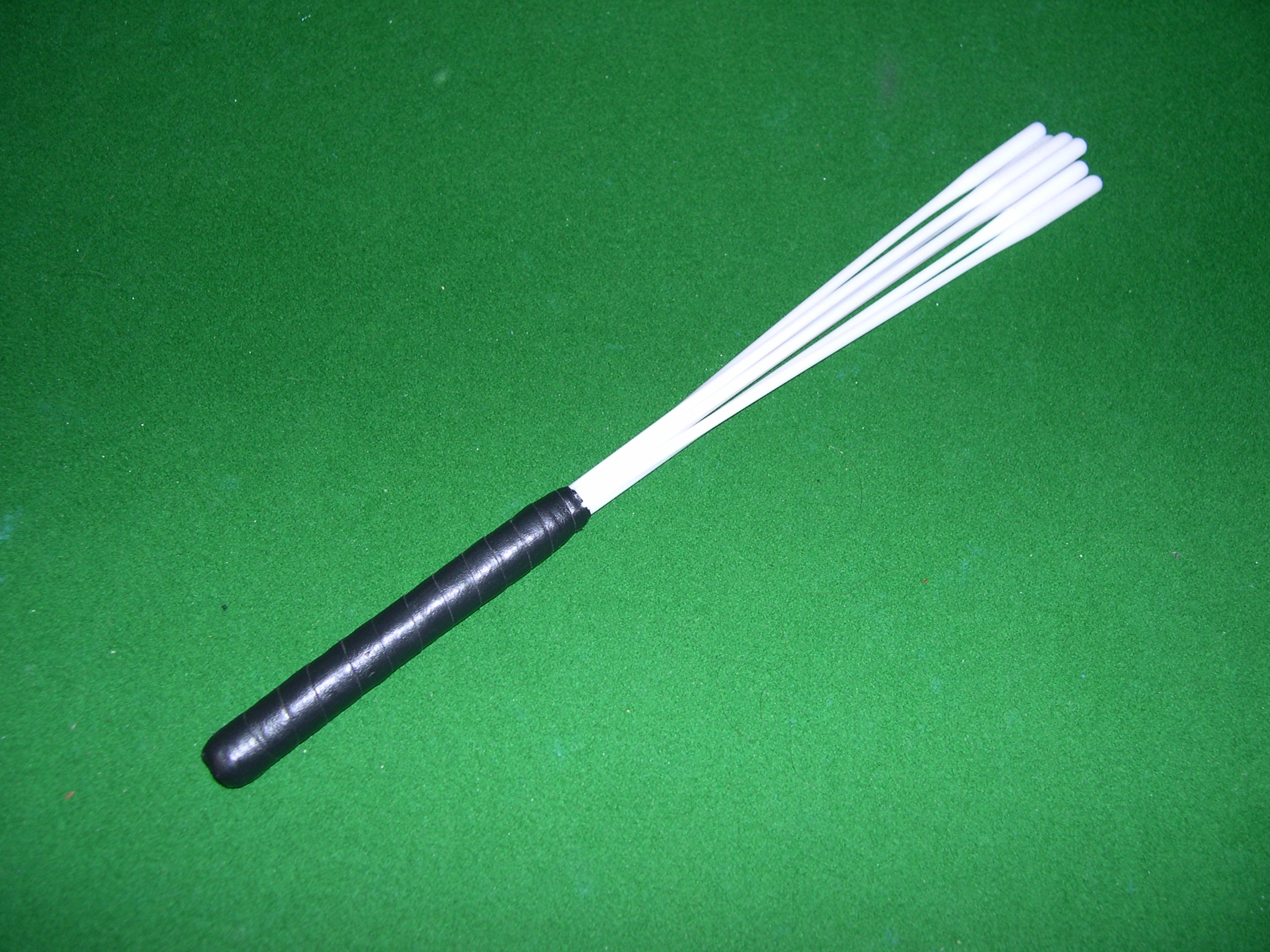
Modern plastic brush-ended beater

== Playing ==
Bodhrán sound example

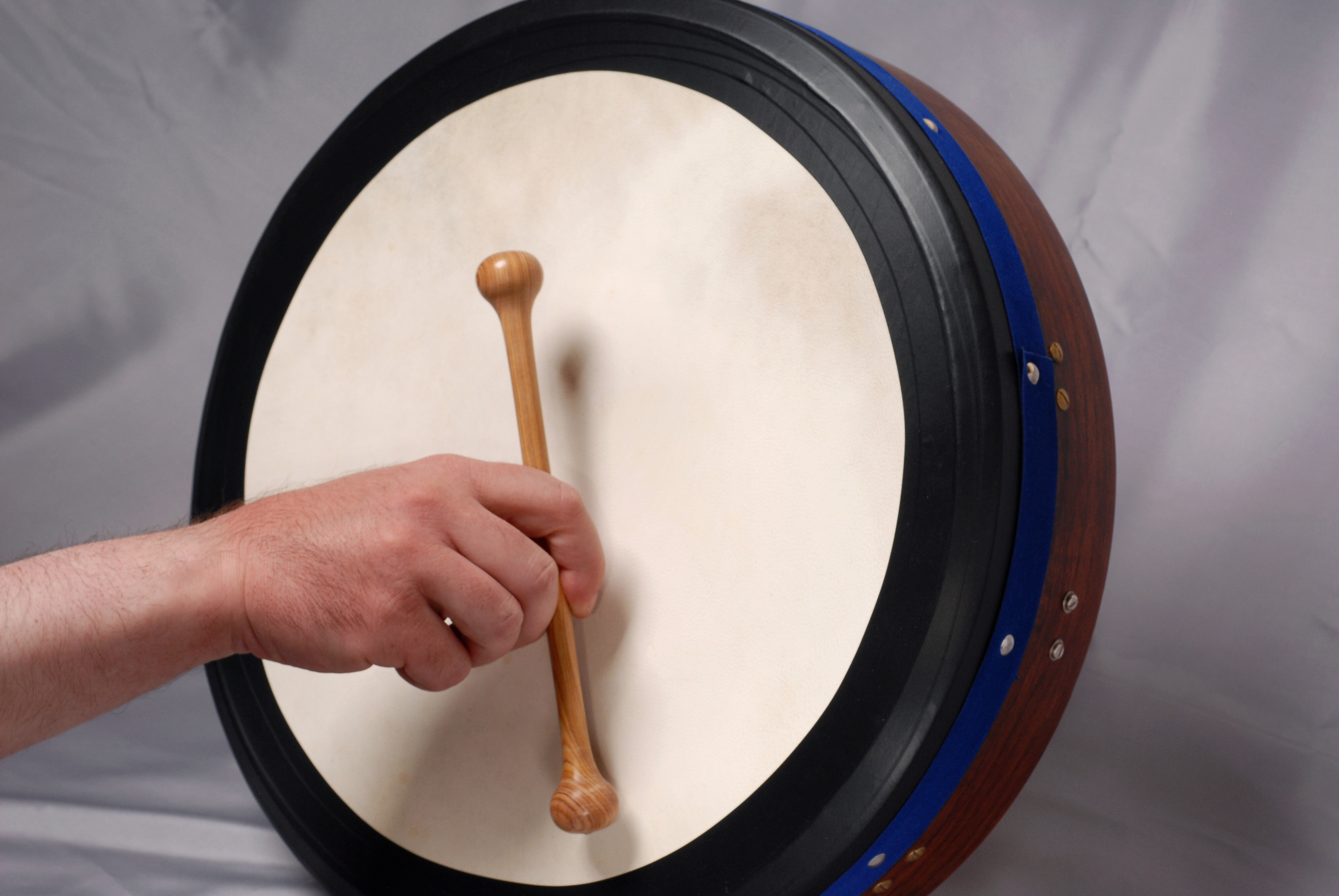
Bodhrán, Kerry style

The drum is usually played in a seated position, held vertically on the player's thigh and supported by their upper body and arm (usually on the left side, for a right-handed player), with the hand placed on the inside of the skin where it is able to control the tension (and therefore the pitch and timbre) by applying varying amounts of pressure and also the amount of surface area being played, with the back of the hand against the crossbar, if present. The drum is struck with the other arm (usually the right) and is played either with the bare hand or with a tipper. There are numerous playing styles, mostly named after the region of Ireland in which they originated. The most common is Kerry style, which uses a two-headed tipper; the West Limerick style uses only one end of the tipper.

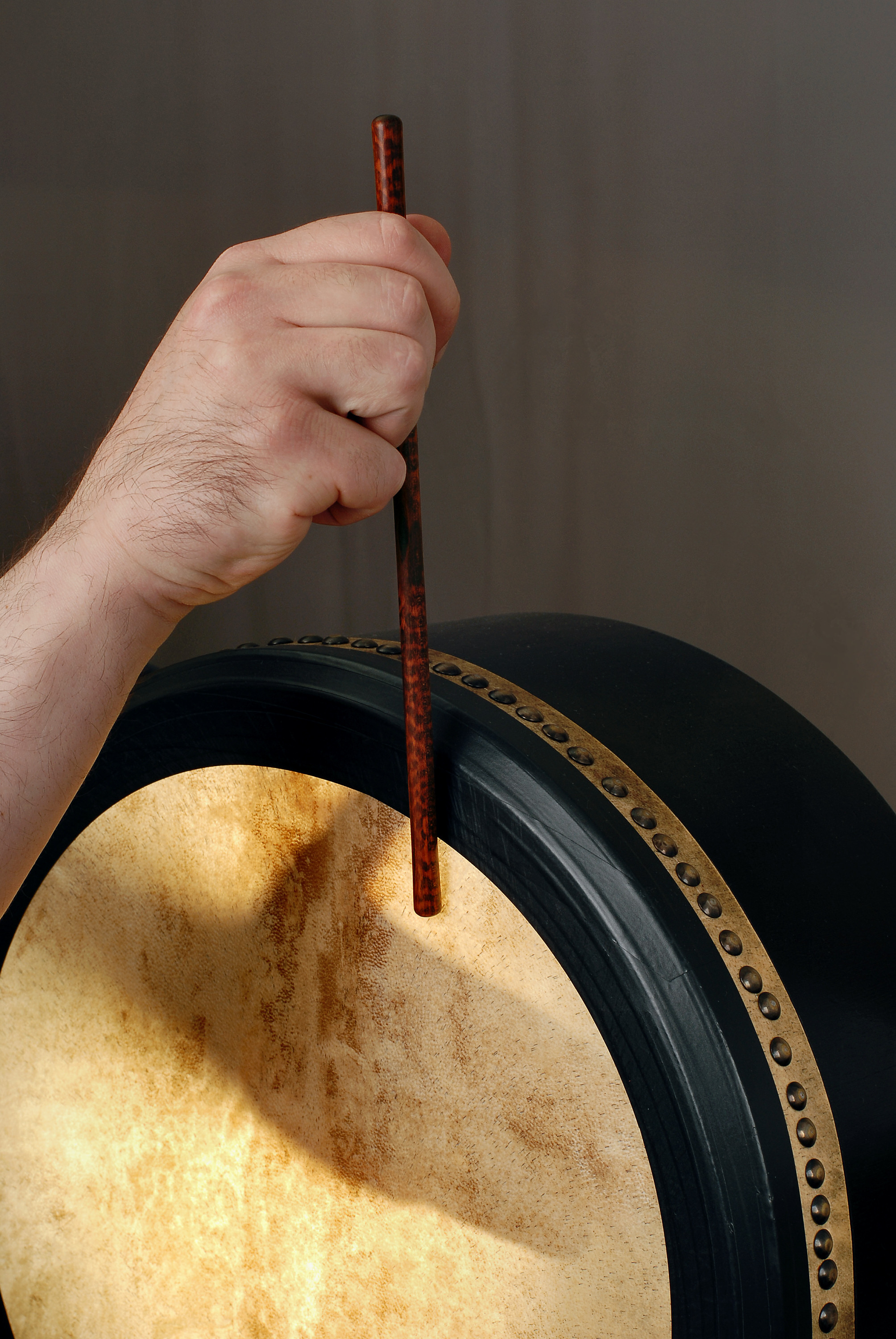
Bodhrán, top-end style

In 1987, Robbie Breathnach, Damien Quinn, and Aidan "Scobie" McDonnell developed and introduced a pitch-varying technique that enabled the bodhrán player to closely follow the cadence and melodic phrasing of the tune being performed. This approach marked a significant technical advancement in bodhrán playing, shifting the instrument from a predominantly rhythmic role toward a more musically responsive one. In the years that followed, players such as Tommy Hayes and Abe Doron played an important role in popularising these techniques and helping to re-invigorate wider interest in Traditional Irish Music, both in Ireland and internationally. This was the birth of the "top-end" style. Their breakthrough in this style has achieved local and international acclaim, with many beginners now being educated in this manner. This "top-end" style is often played on a smaller (14–15 inch) and deeper (4–6 inch) drum with a thinner resonant skin, prepared like the skin of a Lambeg drum. The tipper in this style is usually straight and most of the expressive action is focused on the top end of the drum. The concept involves allowing a greater vs. lesser amount of the skin to resonate, with the "skin hand" acting as a moving bearing edge.

Top-end players move the skin hand from the bottom and towards the top of the drum to generate increasingly high pitches. By making a "C" shape with the skin hand, the player can help enhance and even amplify the sound. The same concept can be employed while playing at the front of the drum (the skin hand moving towards and away from the player) or in a "bottom end" style, which is essentially top end, but upside down, with the majority of tipper strikes at the bottom of the head. In any of these styles, crossbars are most often absent, allowing a more unrestricted access for the left hand to modify the tone. This enables a more melodic approach to this rhythm instrument, with a wide range of tones being employed.

When playing the bodhrán as an accompaniment to Irish music, different beats may be used. For example, reels have a 4/4 time. The bodhrán player must stick to this rhythm but is free to improvise within the structure: most simply, they may enunciate the first beat of four, making a sound like ONE two three four ONE two three four; but they can syncopate, put in double pulses, according to the rhythmic characteristics of the tunes being played. This is the difference between sensitive and insensitive playing, a matter of much concern to other traditional musicians. Because the bodhrán typically plays 16th notes (Kerry style), a great deal of variety can be introduced by these syncopations and the use of rests. Combined with manual pitch changes and naturally occurring tonal variations in an animal skin drumhead, the bodhrán can almost sound as melodically expressive as other non-percussive instruments.

=== New techniques ===
Playing styles have all been affected by the introduction of the internal tone ring, driven against the skin to tension/loosen it by screws. This was invented by Seamus O'Kane, from Dungiven, County Londonderry, Northern Ireland, in 1975, to combat the damp conditions of Donegal. This system was copied from banjo design but adapted for bodhráns. For a few years only about six drums of this type were made, so it was not until the idea was taken and refined by makers that it caught on. This system is now being used by makers from many diverse cultures worldwide. It has revolutionized the making and playing of bodhráns by removing the threat of atmospheric conditions to the tension of the drumhead. The accepted philosophy of thick skins was challenged also at this time by O'Kane's introduction of thin Lambeg skins. This allowed the bodhrán to achieve both higher and lower crisp notes and allowed the players to become more musical and delicate in their playing.

=== Common modifications ===
It is currently not unusual for the rim of a bodhrán to be covered with electrical tape, either by the drum-maker or the owner. This innovation was introduced to Seamus O’Kane from bodhrán player, Johnny ‘Ringo’ McDonagh in the 1970s. This both reduces "edge-loading" (where the vibrations in the skin hit the rim and bounce back toward the center of the drum), and dampens unwanted overtones, allowing for greater control of the drum's sound.

Electrical tape is preferred because the adhesive is rubber-based and will stretch with the skin even after bonding to it, lessening the likelihood of bubbles and other changes in the tape occurring when the skin tension is changed by tuning or atmospheric conditions. Owners of lower quality drums, with thick and rough skins, may also choose to sand the skin very lightly to reduce the rasp when the tipper strikes the face of the drum. Many effects of these and other modifications to the drum-skin, especially high quality skins, can also be achieved through regular use of the drum over time.

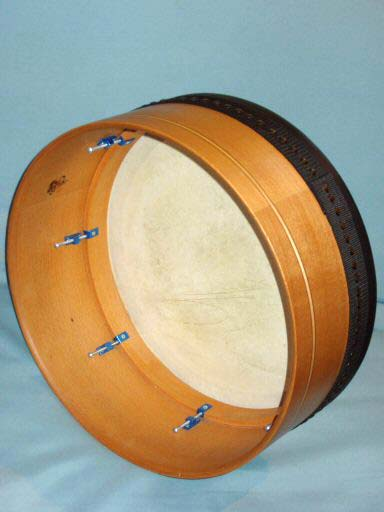
A tunable bodhrán

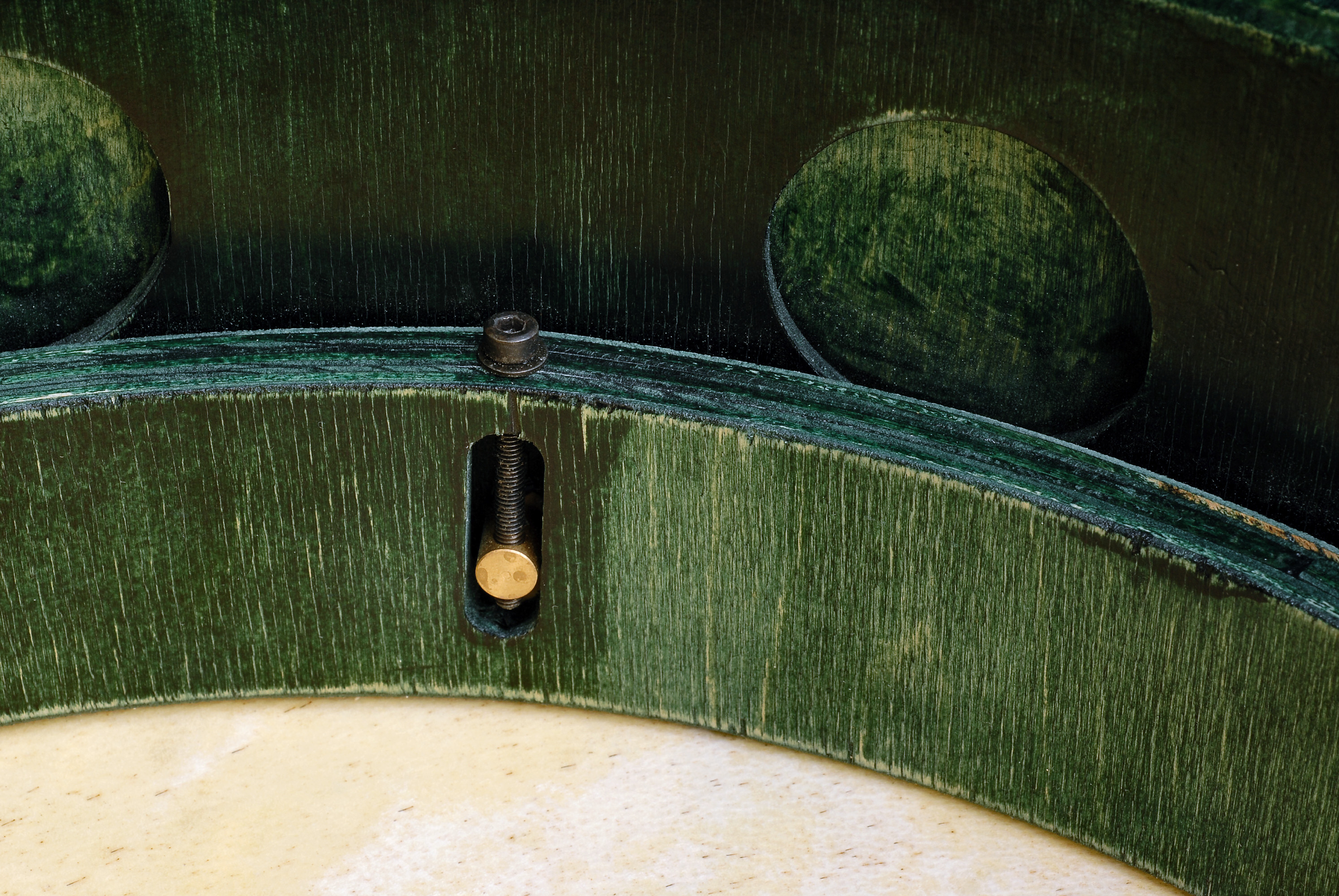
Inside of a Brendan White bodhrán

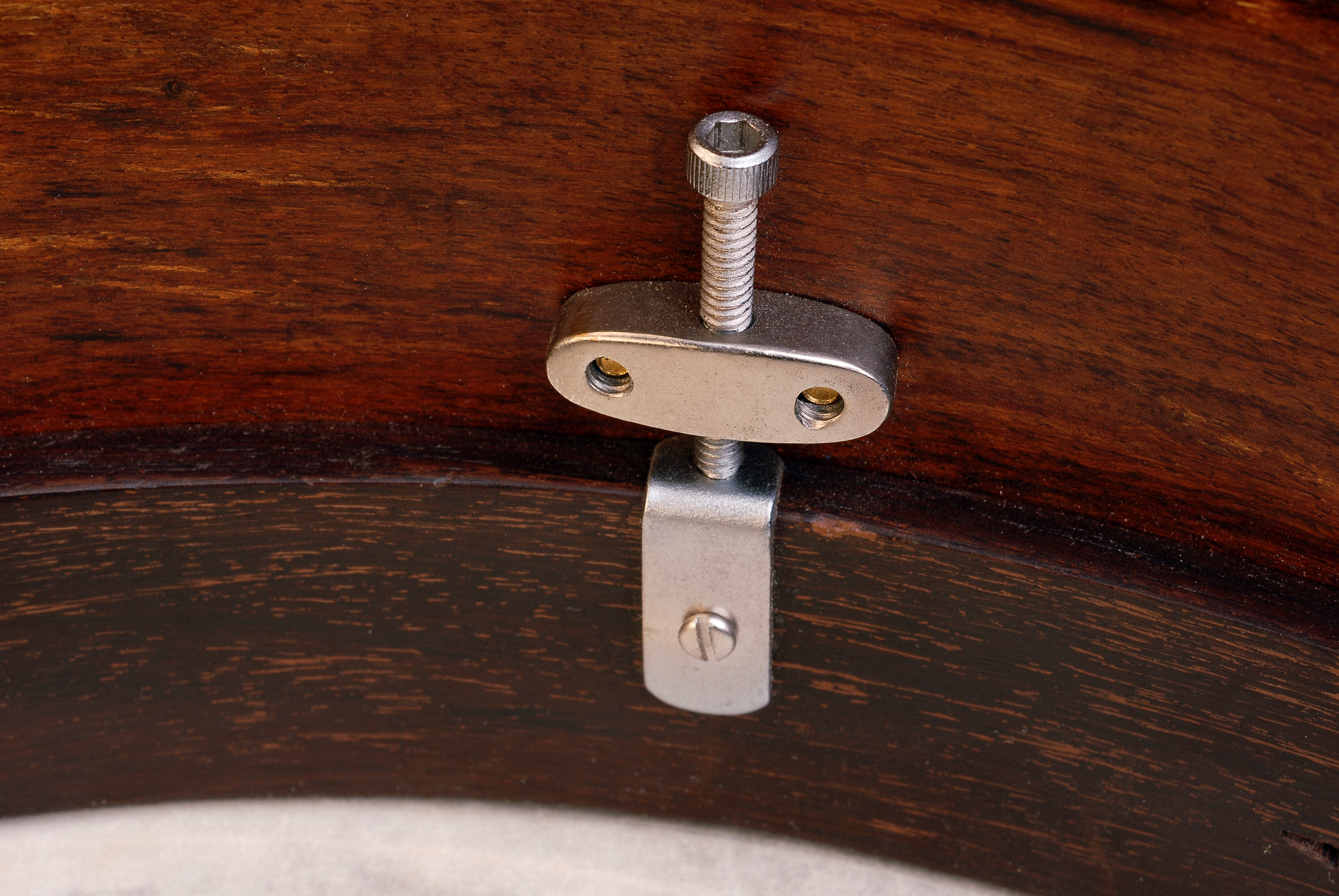
Standard tuning system of a bodhrán from Pakistan

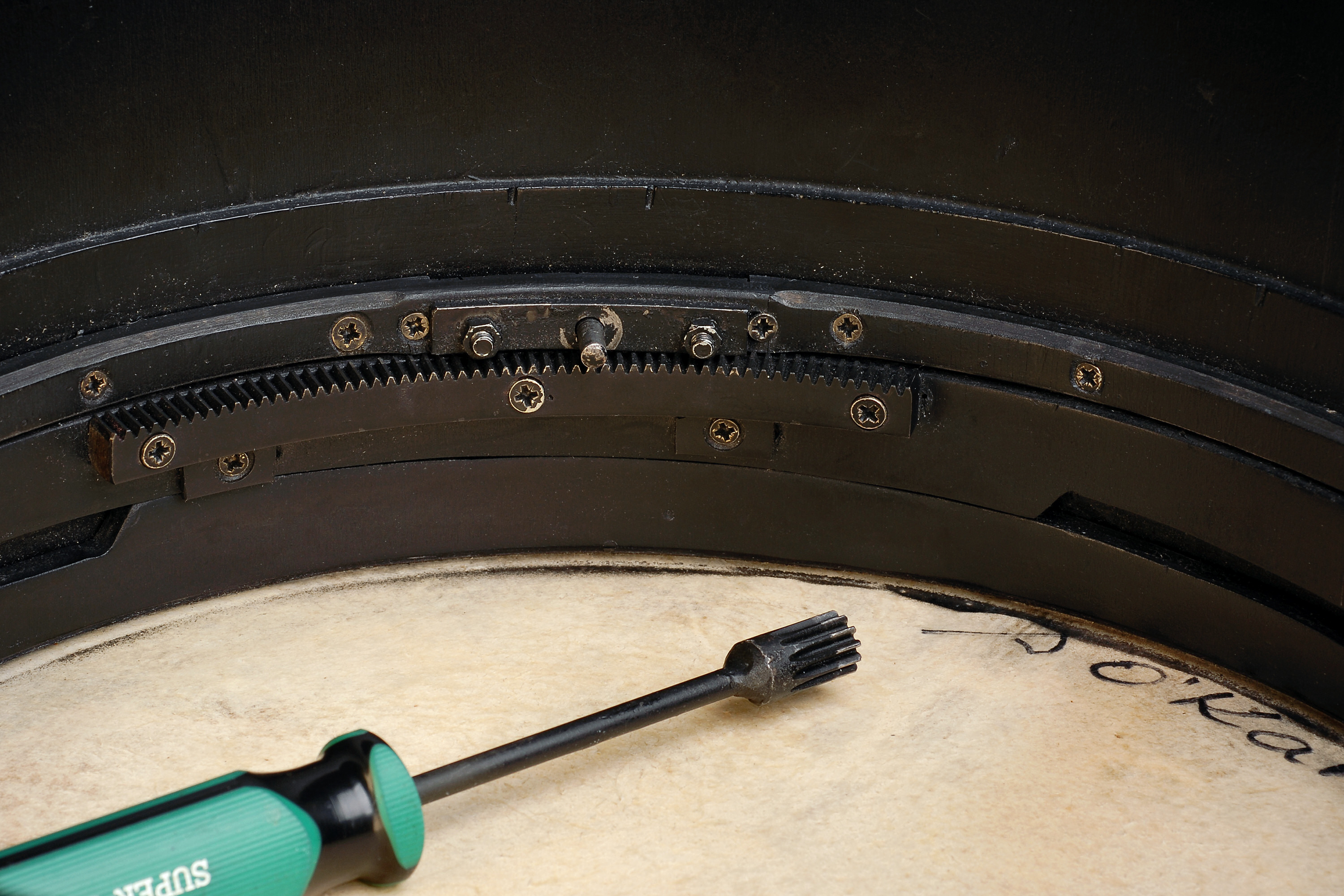
Single-point tuning system by Seamus O'Kane

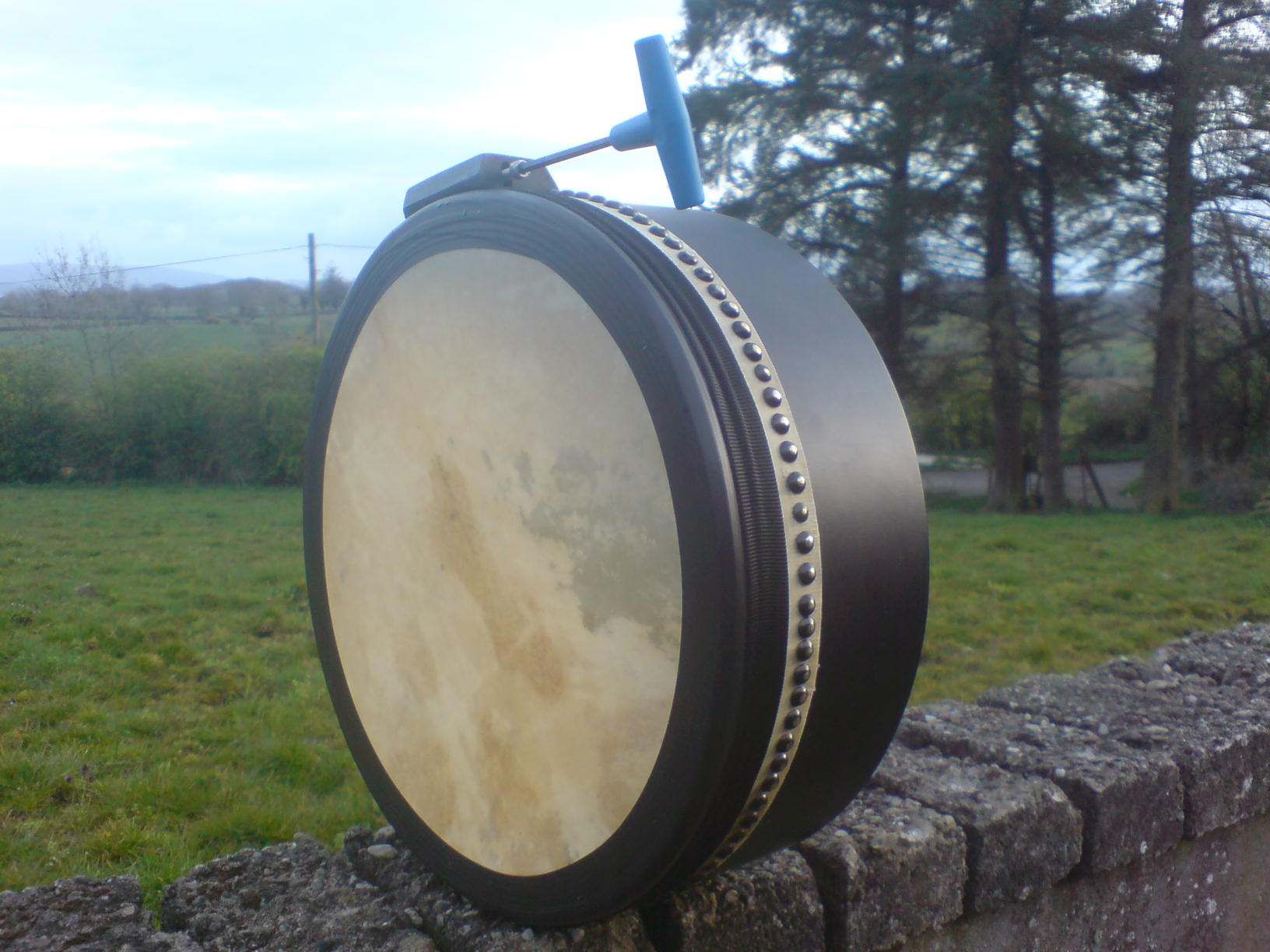
Single Screw Tensioner System by Seamus O'Kane

== See also ==
- List of bodhrán players
- Tar (drum)

== ternal links ==
- Media related to Bodhráns at Wikimedia Commons
