= Nanny Assis =

Brazilian musician and composer

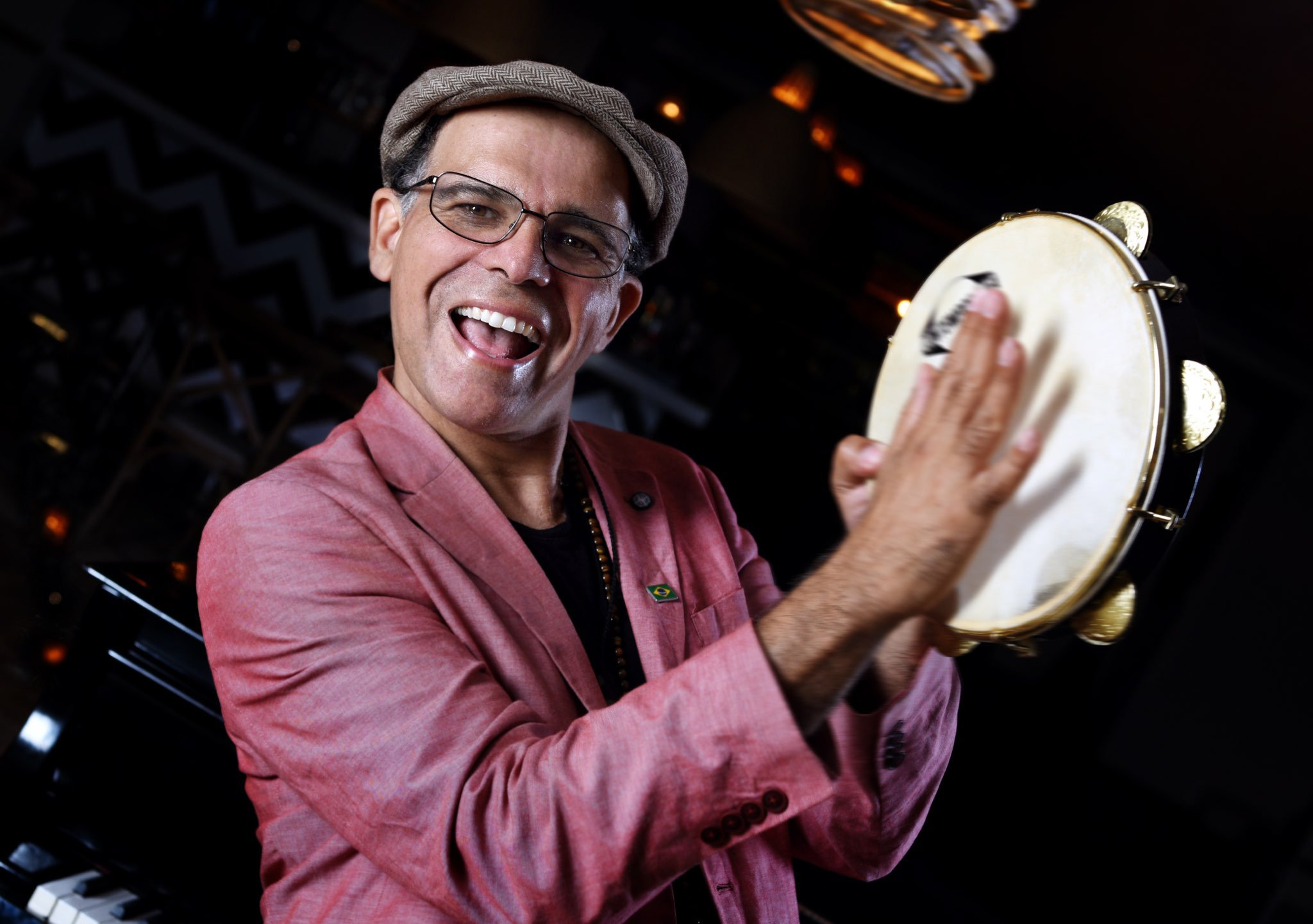

Background information
- Born: Rovanio Rovnny Assis; August 25, 1969 (age 56); Salvador, Bahia, Brazil
- Genres: Bossa nova, samba, jazz, Brazilian jazz
- Occupations: Musician; composer; producer
- Instruments: Vocals; percussion; drums; guitar
- Years active: 1986–present
- Labels: Blue Toucan; In & Out; Mandacaru Records
- Website: https://www.nannyassis.com/ https://afrojobim.com/ https://www.riouphill.com/

Rovanio Rovnny Assis (born August 25, 1969), known professionally as Nanny Assis, is a Brazilian-American singer, percussionist, composer, producer, and guitarist based in New York City.

Assis attributes many artists from Salvador, Bahia, and Brazil more generally as his influences, including Dorival Caymmi, and Tropicália icon Gilberto Gil. He also cites Djavan, Pat Metheny, and Chet Baker for their heavy impact on his artistic approach.

== Early life ==
Assis was born in Salvador, Bahia, Brazil in 1969. When he was 7, he began participating in several children's and youth choirs and singing and playing at the churches where his father, an evangelical pastor, preached.

Assis studied linguistics and Portuguese literature at the Catholic University of Salvador.

== Career ==
In 1984, Assis participated in the Bahia Instrumental Festival.

In 1993, Assis joined the Austin, Texas–based band Rolling Thunder as a percussionist. Then, in 1999, after six years of regular work in the United States, he moved to New York City.

Assis continued working in multiple genres but primarily performed with jazz musicians. Some acts Assis performed alongside include Lauren Henderson, trumpeter Mark Morganelli, and keyboardist Pete Levin.

After 1999, Assis also performed across Europe, in countries including Italy, France, Switzerland, The Netherlands, and England. Assis has been featured at Queen Elizabeth Hall in London as well as Jazz Forum Arts, Birdland, Zinc Bar, Blue Note Jazz Club, SOB's, Jazz Standard, Red Rooster Harlem, and Joe's Pub in New York City.

In 2011 and 2017, Assis received the Brazilian International Press Award as "Best Singer of the Year." Also, in 2017, Assis received the award of Brazilian Ambassador on Music and Arts in Tokyo, Japan for his work promoting Brazilian culture in Japan, New Zealand, Cuba, Italy, Russia, Israel, Turkey, and England. Additionally, Assis has composed music for theater productions such as "Rio Uphill."

== Discography ==
- Double Rainbow (Blue Toucan, 2006)
- Brasilian Vibes (2010)
- Requinte Trio - Honey & Air (2015)
- Rovanio (In & Out, 2023)

== Filmography ==
- 2022: Ron Carter: Finding the Right Notes
