= Adufe =

Musical instrument

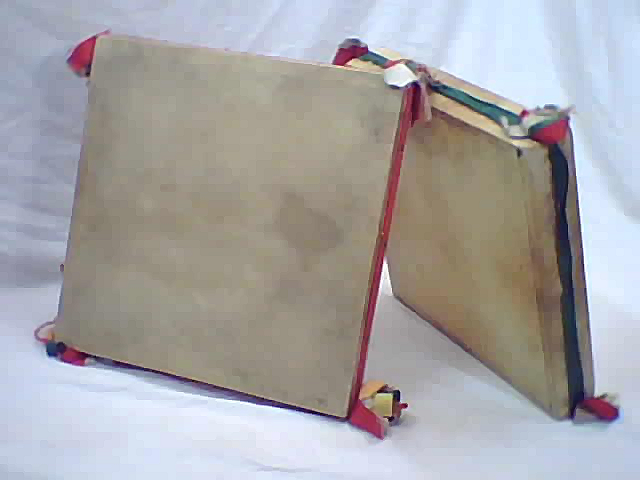

Percussion instrument
- Classification: Frame drum
- Hornbostel–Sachs classification: 211.311 (Directly struck membranophone)

Adufe being played

The adufe is a traditional square frame drum of Moorish origin, which is used in Portugal and Galicia, and other regions of Spain.

== History ==
A Portuguese percussion instrument, it was traditionally used in the Beira region of Castelo Branco. It was also used in many other regions across the Iberian Peninsula, and similar instruments are also found in Northern Africa. Normally used for Christian religious processions it was also used as a musical company for the local festivals or even for the works in the fields. Traditionally, it was only played by women. However it was also played by men in several occasions, though not in religious times.

== Features ==
The adufe is a square or rectangular frame drum usually made of pine, over which is mounted a goat's skin. The size of the frame usually ranges from 12 to 22 inches on each side, and 1 to 2 inches thick. The skin is stitched on the sides, with the stitches covered by a coloured ribbon. In the interior small seeds or small stones are placed to make pleasing sounds. An adufe is completely handmade.

== See also ==
- Daf
- Pandeiro
